= EuroCity-Express =

Train category of Deutsche Bahn

EuroCity Express, or short ECE, is a category of Eurocity train marketed by Deutsche Bahn that runs on two routes as of 2021. It was created to classify a newly introduced international high speed train service in a higher category - equivalent to the Intercity-Express (ICE) - than the existing Eurocity, which is equivalent to the "second tier" domestic Intercity (IC).

== History ==
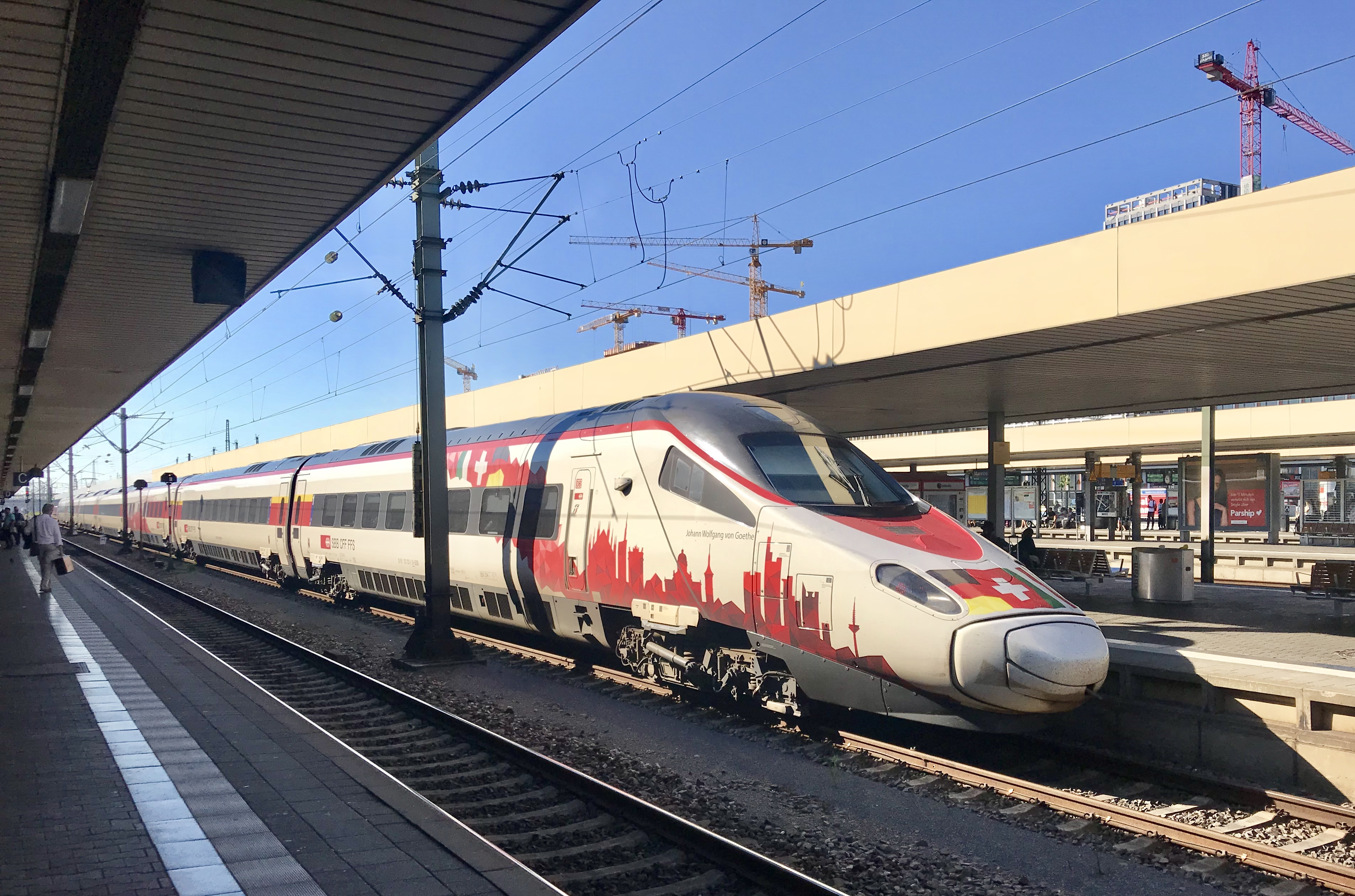
ECE451 at Mannheim Hbf.

The train category was newly created with the timetable change on December 10, 2017, because the Frankfurt-Milan connection, operated with an ETR 610 of the Swiss Federal Railways, offers ICE-like travel times and comfort, according to Deutsche Bahn. Because the train would have been classified as an EC only in the second highest train category, the new EuroCity-Express category was created in line with the ICE, which is equivalent to the ICE in terms of fares.

With the change of timetable on December 13, 2020, ECE trains operated by ETR 610 "Astoro" began service on the partially new electrified line between Munich and Zurich. In the medium term, the German Federal Minister of Transport, Andreas Scheuer, is aiming to integrate these connections into his concept of a "Trans-Europ-Express 2.0".

== Services ==
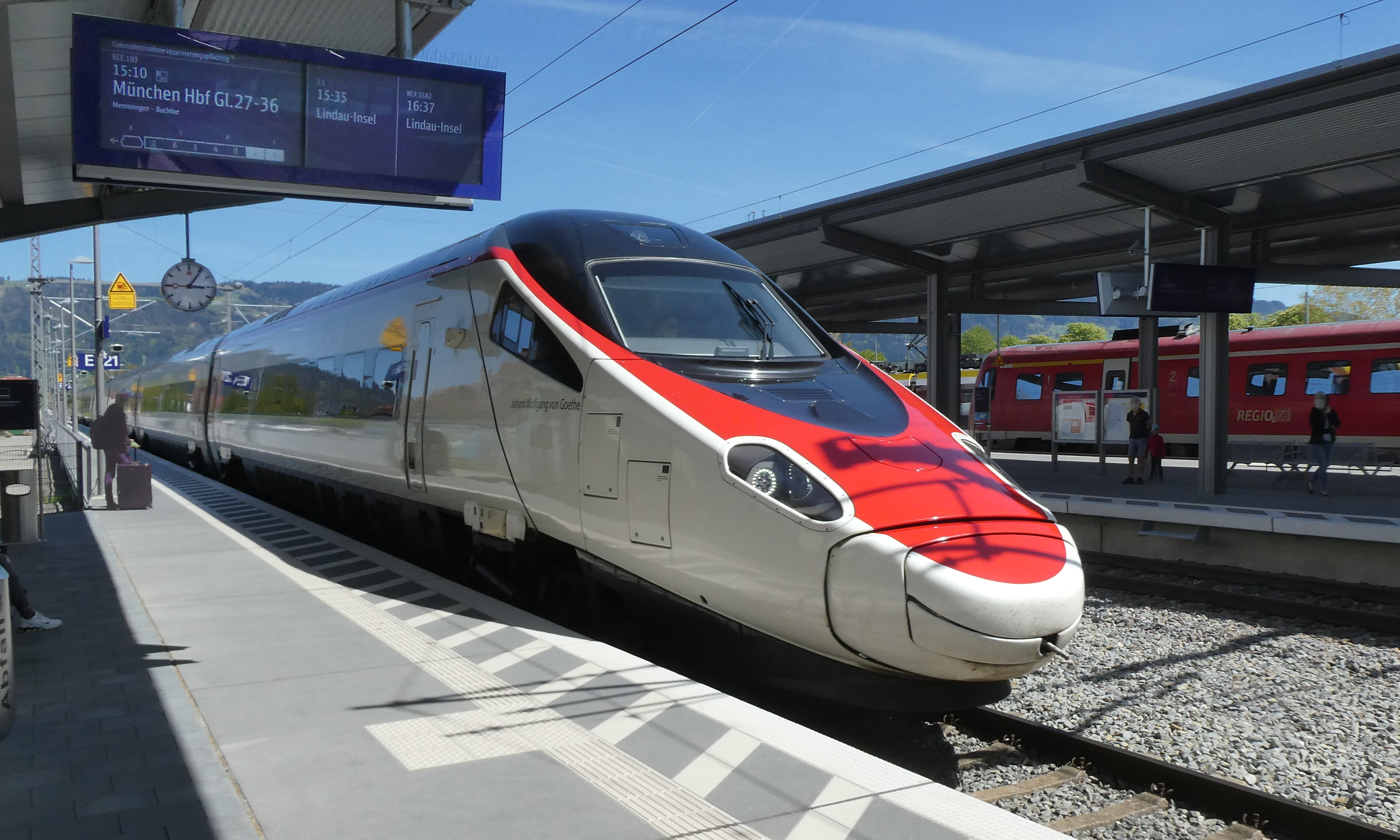
SBB's ETR 610 at Lindau-Reutin station.

=== Frankfurt–Milano ===
The first ECE line, introduced in 2017, runs from Frankfurt Central Station via Mannheim, Karlsruhe, Freiburg and Basel to Milano Centrale station. The train is only operated as ECE in Germany (Frankfurt (Main) Hbf to Basel Bad Bf); in Switzerland and Italy, the train type is EuroCity (EC). In terms of the timetable, this is an extension of the EC Milano Centrale–Basel SBB to the north. As of 2025, the service operates as EC/ECE85:

- ECE 85: Frankfurt (Main)–Mannheim–Karlsruhe–Ringsheim–Freiburg–Basel Bad Bf–Basel SBB–Olten–Lucerne–Arth-Goldau–Bellinzona–Lugano–Chiasso–Como–Monza–Milan

=== Munich–Zurich ===
The service between Munich and Zurich was launched with the timetable change in December 2020. In cooperation with Swiss Federal Railways and ÖBB, six pairs of ECE trains are offered daily. The line's launch was made possible by the electrification of the Geltendorf-Lindau section of the Buchloe–Lindau railway. Previously, four EuroCity train pairs ran daily on the connection, three of them via Memmingen, as is the case now with the ECE, and one via Kempten Hbf. The latter route was eliminated with the changeover, as the line via Kempten has not been electrified. The section to Basel SBB is discontinued as well. While the former ECs went to the terminus station on the island of Lindau, the ECEs serve the long-distance through-station Lindau-Reutin solely. In Austria and Switzerland, the train type is EuroCity (EC). As of 2025, the service runs as EC/ECE88:

- ECE 88: München Hbf–Buchloe–Memmingen–Lindau-Reutin–Bregenz–St. Margrethen–St. Gallen–Winterthur–Zurich Airport–Zürich HB

=== Hamburg–Basel ===
With the December 2025 timetable change, two existing train pairs of InterCity-Express line 20 between Hamburg and Basel were rebranded as EuroCity-Express in cooperation with the Swiss Federal Railways. A previous EuroCity connection between Hamburg, Basel and Interlaken via Bremen Hbf, Cologne Hbf and Mainz Hbf was discontinued and replaced by a new InterCity-Express connection using the ICE 4. The EuroCity-Express trains take the faster route via Hannover Hbf, Kassel-Wilhelmshöhe and Frankfurt(Main)Hbf, where the Giruno trainsets of the Swiss federal railways can reach their top speed of 250 km/h.

There are plans to extend these services to Zurich and Milan.

- ICE/ECE 20: Hamburg-Dammtor–Hamburg Hbf–Hamburg-Harburg–Hannover Hbf–Göttingen–Kassel-Wilhelmshöhe–Frankfurt(Main)Hbf–Mannheim Hbf–Karlsruhe Hbf–Offenburg–Freiburg(Breisgau)Hbf–Basel Bad Bf–Basel SBB

=== Hamburg–Padborg–Copenhagen ===
With the introduction of new Talgo 230 sets owned by Danish State Railways in November 2025, former EuroCity and InterCity services between Hamburg and Copenhagen were rebranded as EuroCity-Express. Due to reliability issues with the new trainsets, the rollout of the new ECE brand was only completed in May 2026 as older loco-hauled German IC or Danish IC3 diesel multiple units still operated under the EuroCity branding.

Because of the ongoing construction of the fixed Fehmarnbelt crossing, trains are re-routed via Padborg. The journey takes about 5 hours. Once completed, the journey time will be halved to about 2.5 hours.

- ECE 75: Hamburg Hbf–Schleswig–Padborg–Kolding–Odense–Ringsted–København H

== Equipment ==
SBB's Alstom ETR 610 ("Astoro") are used: SBB RABe 503 022 was given a trinational design for the inauguration of the first ECE connection and was given the name Johann Wolfgang von Goethe at Basel SBB station on November 17, 2017. SBB's Alstom ETR 610 trains with tilting technology are also in operation on the route between Munich and Zurich.

SBB RABe 501 ("Giruno") trainsets are used on the Frankfurt (Main)–Milan and Hamburg–Basel line.

Between Hamburg and Copenhagen, Talgo 230 sets owned by DSB are used.

== Rate system ==
In Germany, the train is priced at the ICE fare. In Italy, on the other hand, it is sold as a regular EuroCity. In Switzerland, there is in general no differentiation in fares according to train category. In cross-border traffic to Italy, a global fare also applies, with a seat reservation included in the fare. On services to Denmark, a seat reservation is mandatory between June and August and is included in the ticket price.

== See also ==
- High-speed rail in Germany
- Rail transport in Germany
