= Denmark–Germany border =

International border

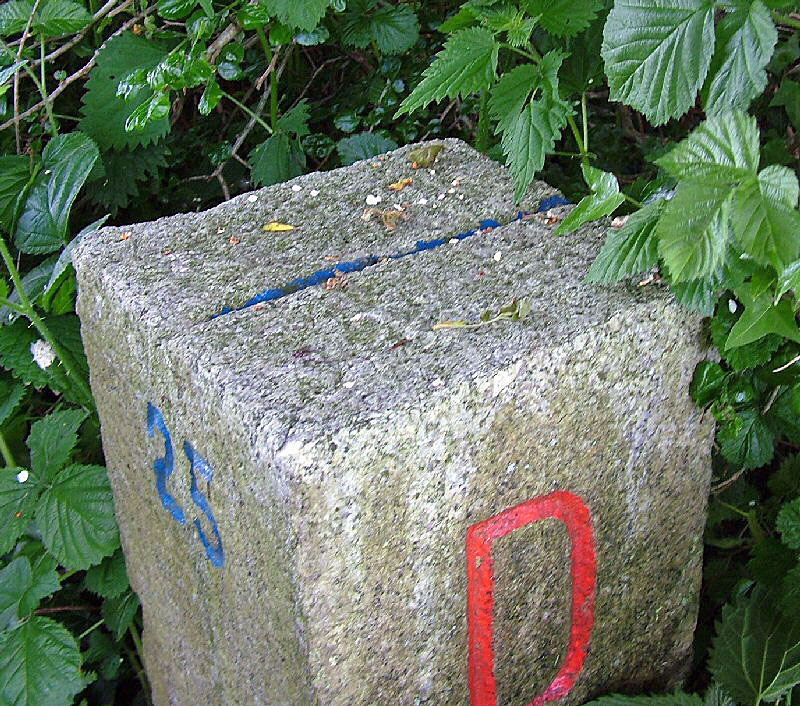
- Border marking stone

Characteristics
- Entities: Denmark; Germany
- Length: 68 km (42 mi)

History
- Established: 1920; 106 years ago

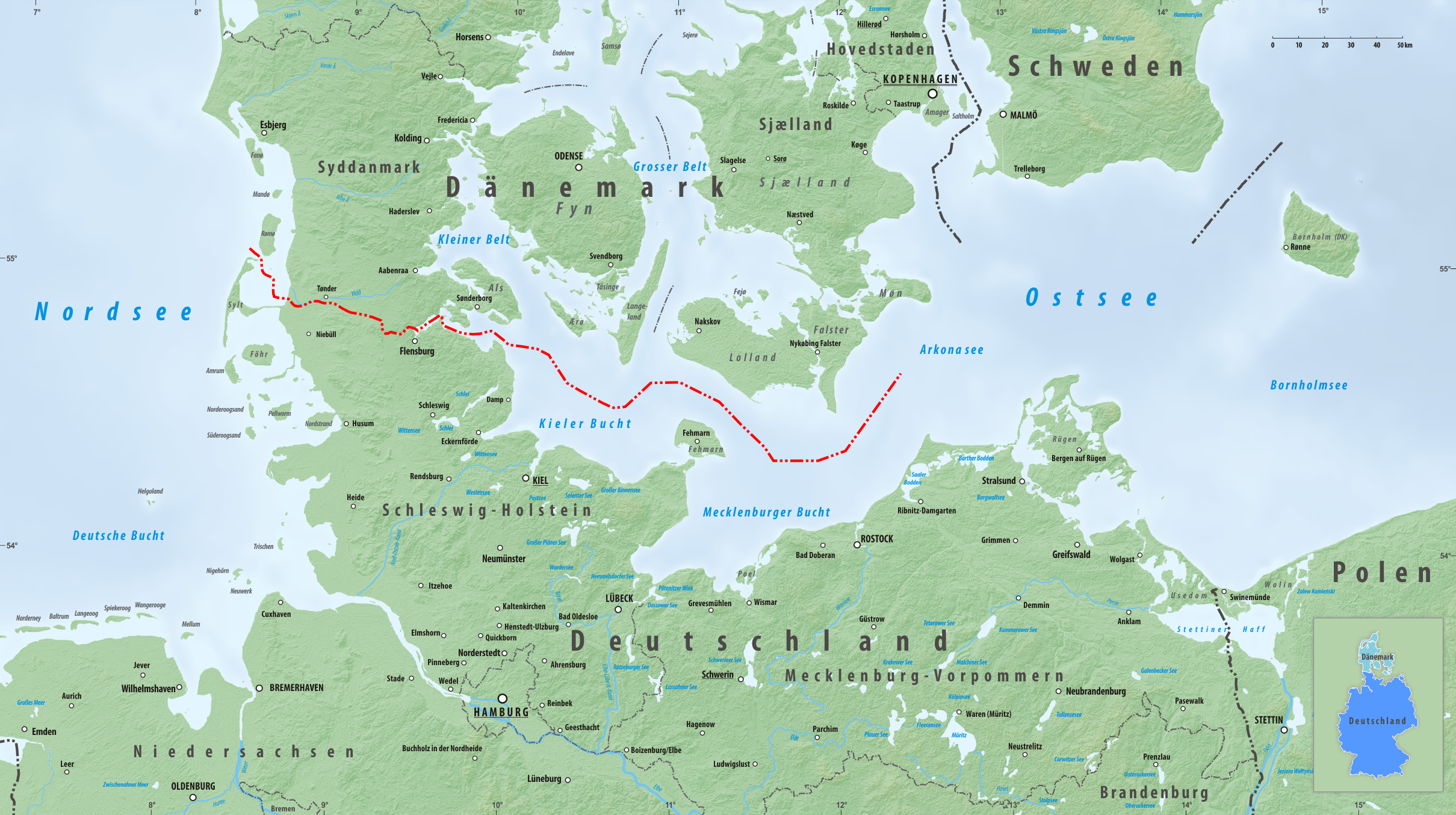
Danish–German land and maritime borders

The Denmark–Germany border (Danish: Grænsen mellem Danmark og Tyskland; German: Grenze zwischen Dänemark und Deutschland) is a land and maritime border between the modern countries of Denmark and Germany. It includes one of Denmark's two land borders (the other being the border with Canada on Hans Island). The land border with Germany is 68 kilometres (42 mi) long.

== History ==
In the treaty of Heiligen in 811, the Eider river was recognized as a border between Denmark and the Frankish Empire. As a swampy river, it formed a natural border. In the highest area near the watershed, it was drier. The ancient travel route of Hærvejen went there, and a defense wall, Danevirke, was built there. Later the duchies of Schleswig and Holstein arose. Before 1864 Schleswig was a fiefdom of Denmark, while Holstein was a fief of the Holy Roman Empire (until 1806) and a member of the German Confederation (after 1815). Both territories were ruled by the Danish king in his additional role as Duke of Schleswig and Duke of Holstein (occasionally together with other Dukes, like the Gottorp Dukes). The border between the Danish fief of Schleswig and the German fief of Holstein still ran along the Eider river, the boundary between the duchies and the Kingdom of Denmark ran along the Kongeå watercourse, and the southern boundary of the Danish monarchy (≈Helstaten) ran along the Elbe.

In 1864, Schleswig-Holstein was conquered by Prussia, and so an international border was created between Denmark and Germany/Schleswig-Holstein. It went from a place at the coast 5 kilometres (3 mi) south of Ribe, rounded Ribe on 5 kilometres (3 mi) distance, then went eastbound just south of Vamdrup, and just north of Christiansfeld to the Baltic Sea.

In 1920, the border was moved about 50 kilometres (31 mi) southward to the present position, as determined by the Schleswig referendum in 1920. This approximately followed the not clearly defined language border.

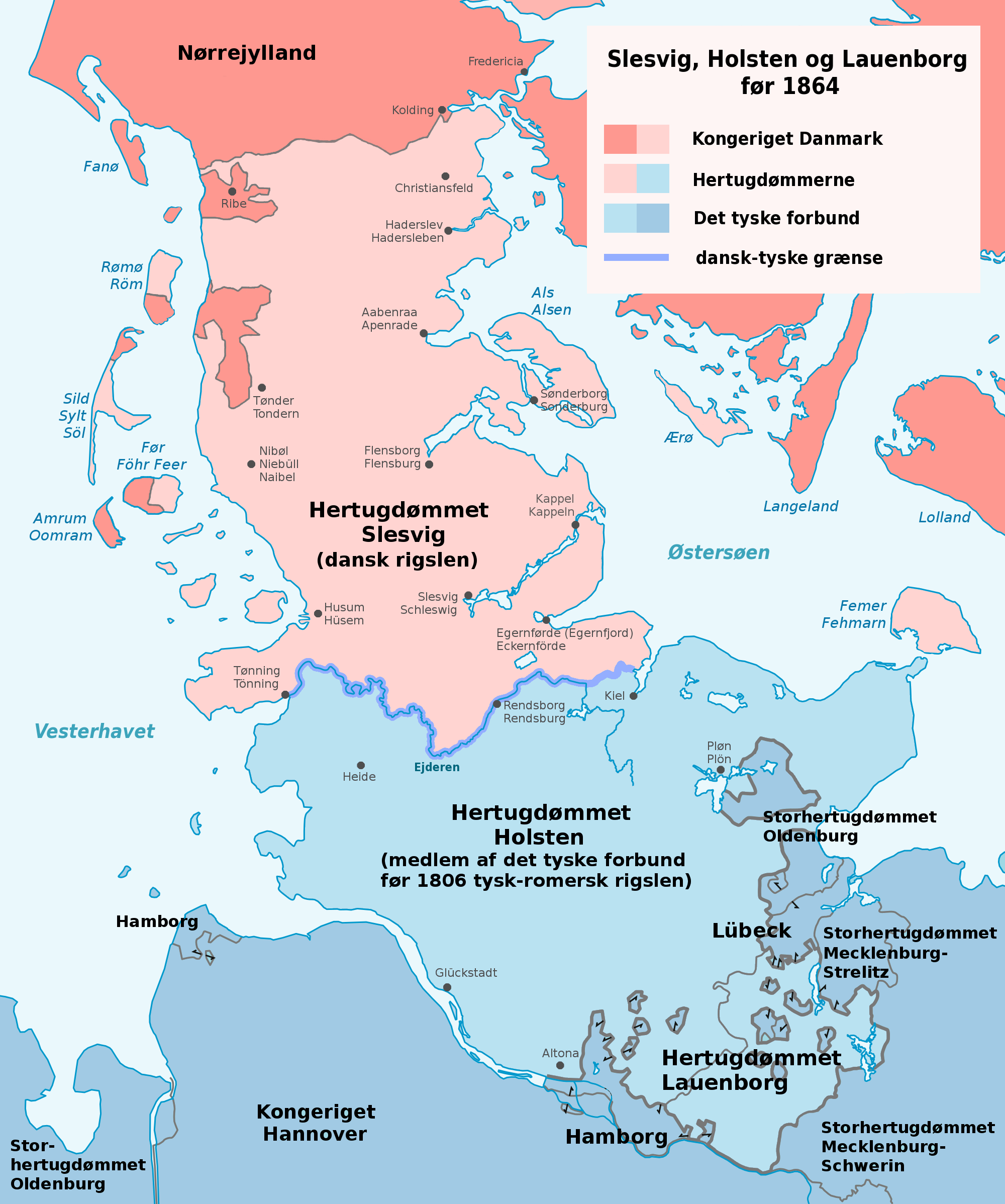
The duchies Schleswig, Holstein and Lauenburg before 1864

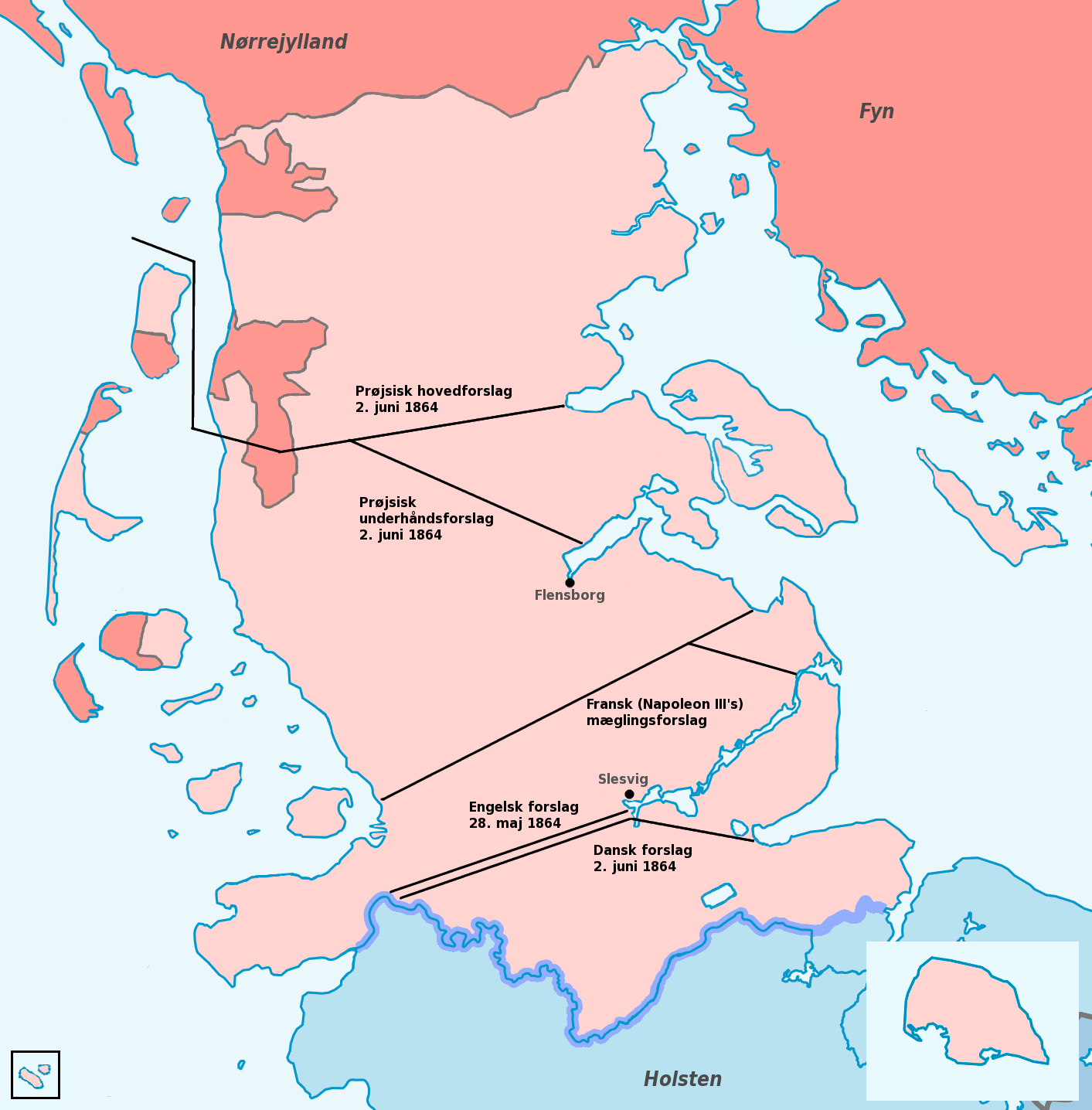
Border proposals in 1864

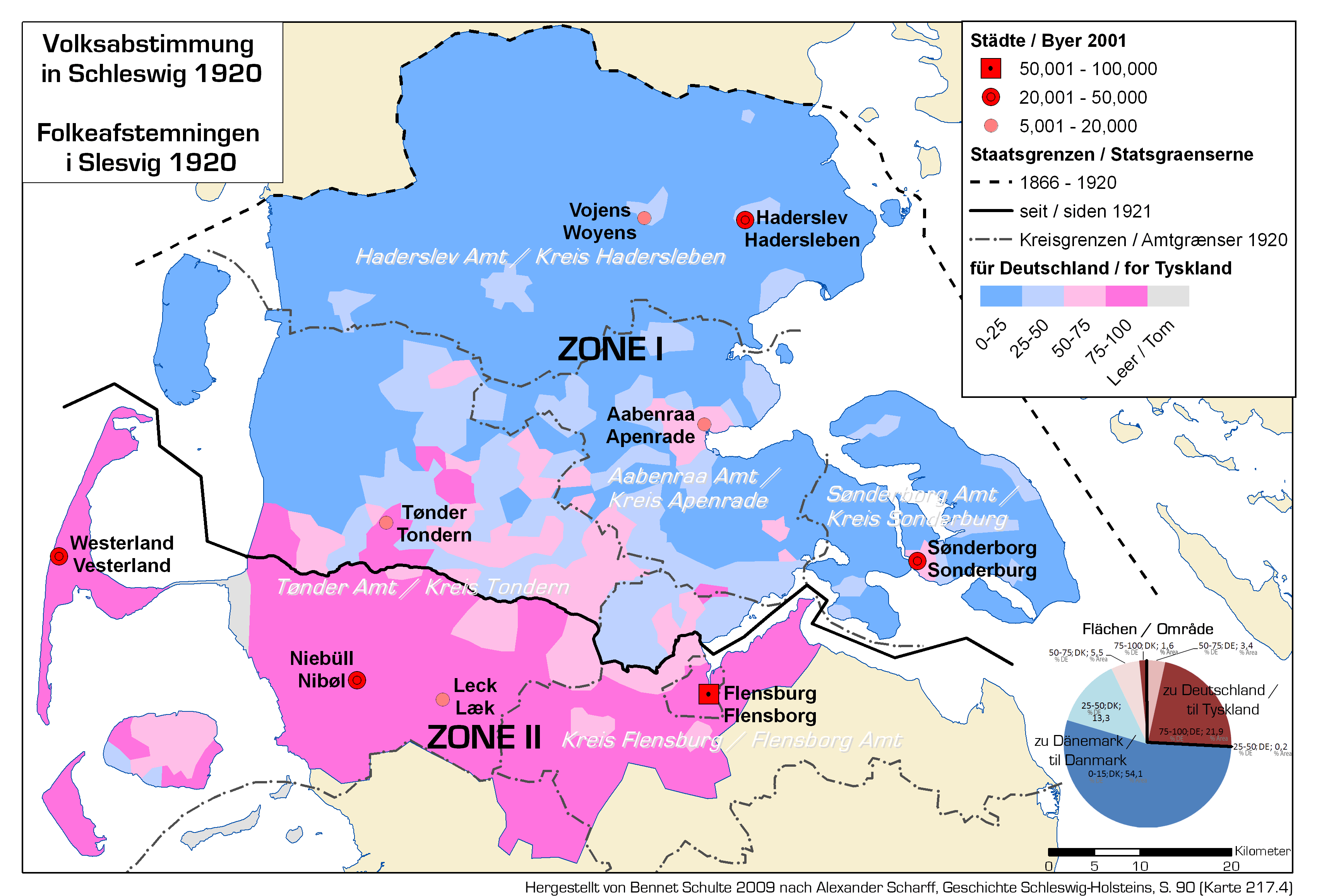
Results of the vote in 1920

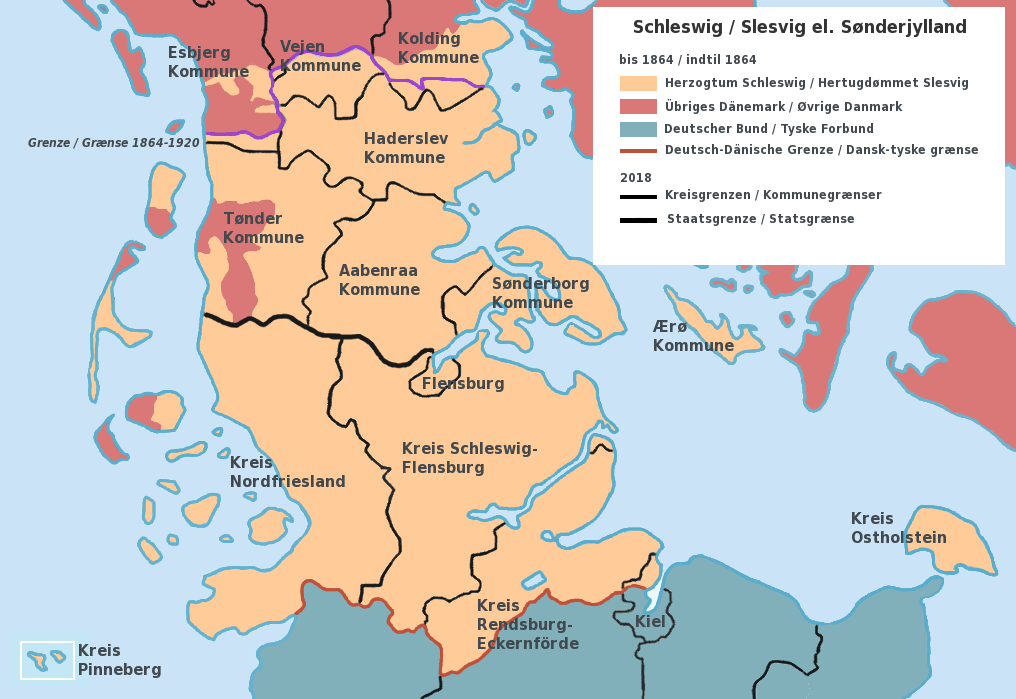
Schleswig/Slesvig with former and present-day administrative borders

== Border controls ==
In 2001, all border controls were removed based on the Schengen Agreement.

In response to the Swedish border control due to the European migrant crisis, border checks were temporarily introduced starting January 4, 2016. Prime minister Lars Løkke Rasmussen cited fear of accumulation of illegal migrants in Copenhagen as one of the reasons for this decision. It was reported that the border controls at the German border cost the Danish tax payers 1.25 billion DKK (€167 million) from 2016 until mid-2019. They were never fully ended before the COVID-19 pandemic in early 2020, which caused renewed border closures throughout Europe.

To pass the border, an approved travel document is needed. This is mainly a passport. But also a national identity card from the European Economic Area is acceptable, although Denmark does not issue such cards, so a passport is needed for Danes for crossing back into Denmark.

== Wild boar fence ==
In January 2019, the Danish government began constructing a fence along the border to keep wild boar, which can carry African swine fever virus, from crossing into Denmark. The 1.5 metres (4.9 ft) high, nearly 70 kilometres (43 mi) long fence—spanning the entire land border—was completed in December 2019 at an estimated cost of 30.4 million Danish kroner. The fence has created some protests. In May 2019 a volleyball tournament was held over the fence as a publicity event which was given some media attention. After completion there was a decision to raise it by adding wires over it, because animals like deer have been killed after being injured because of jumping over the fence.

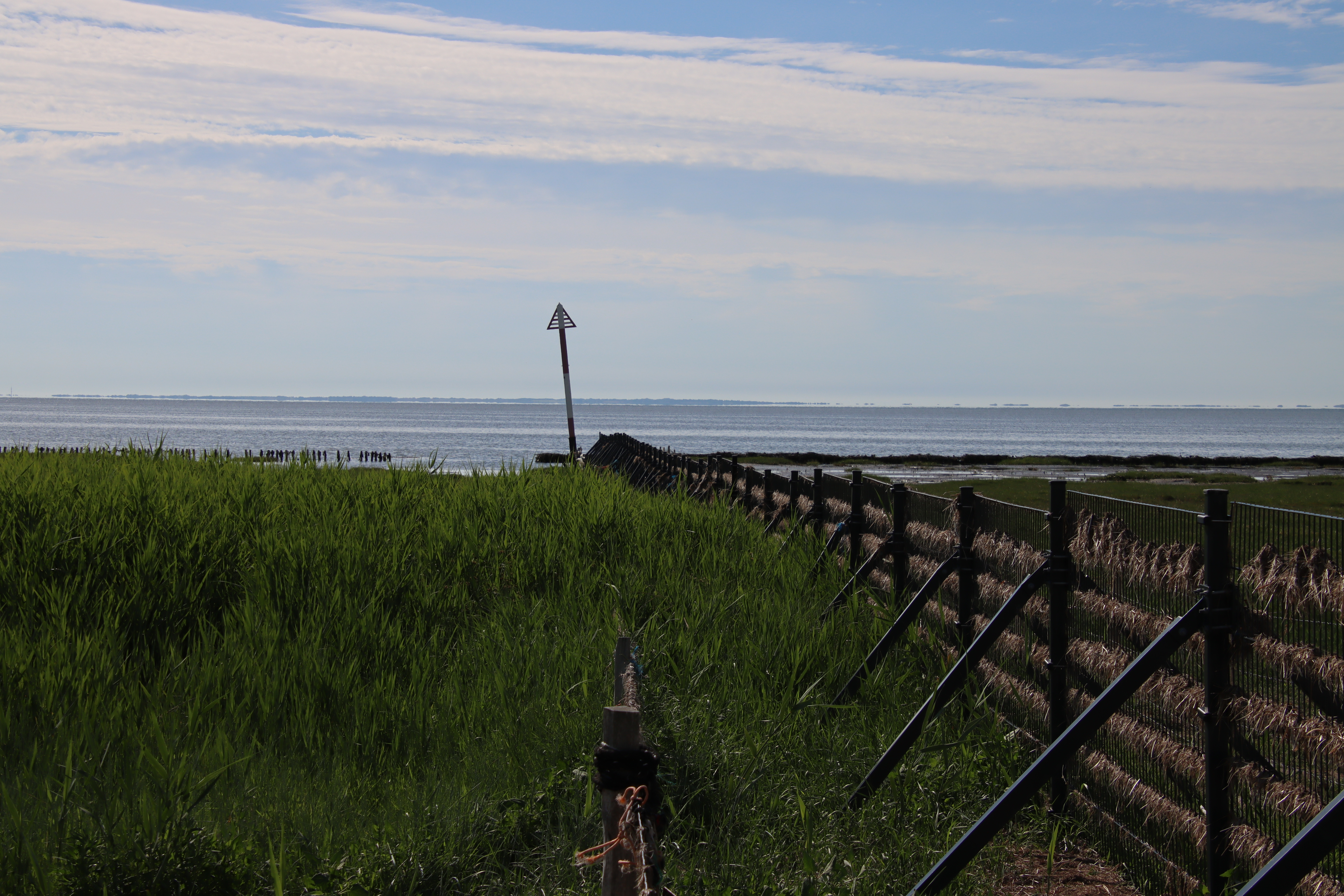
Western end of the fence at the Wadden Sea

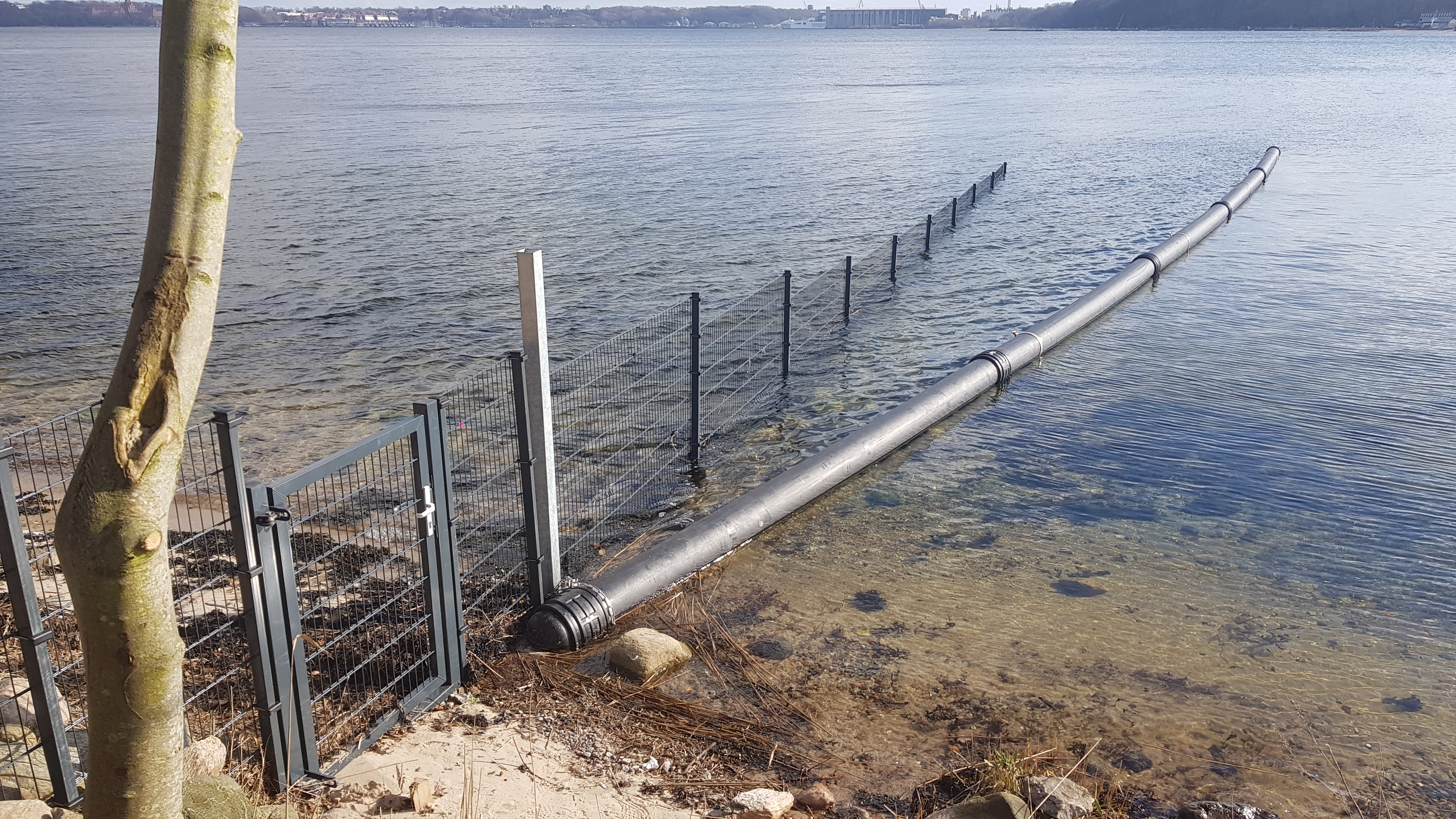
Eastern end of the fence in the Flensburg Firth

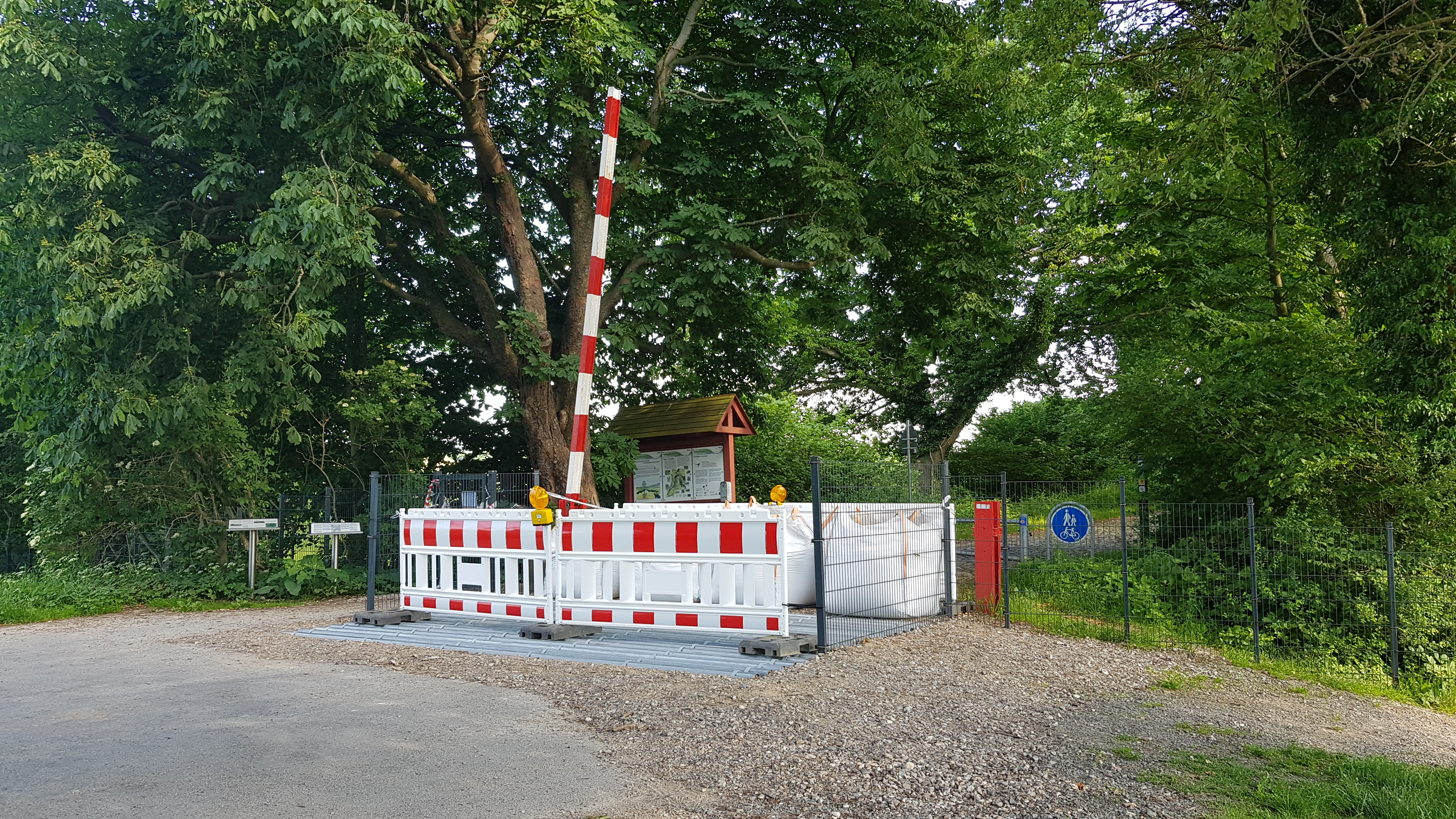
The Rønsdam border crossing at Padborg with fence, Cattle grid and Corona crisis block

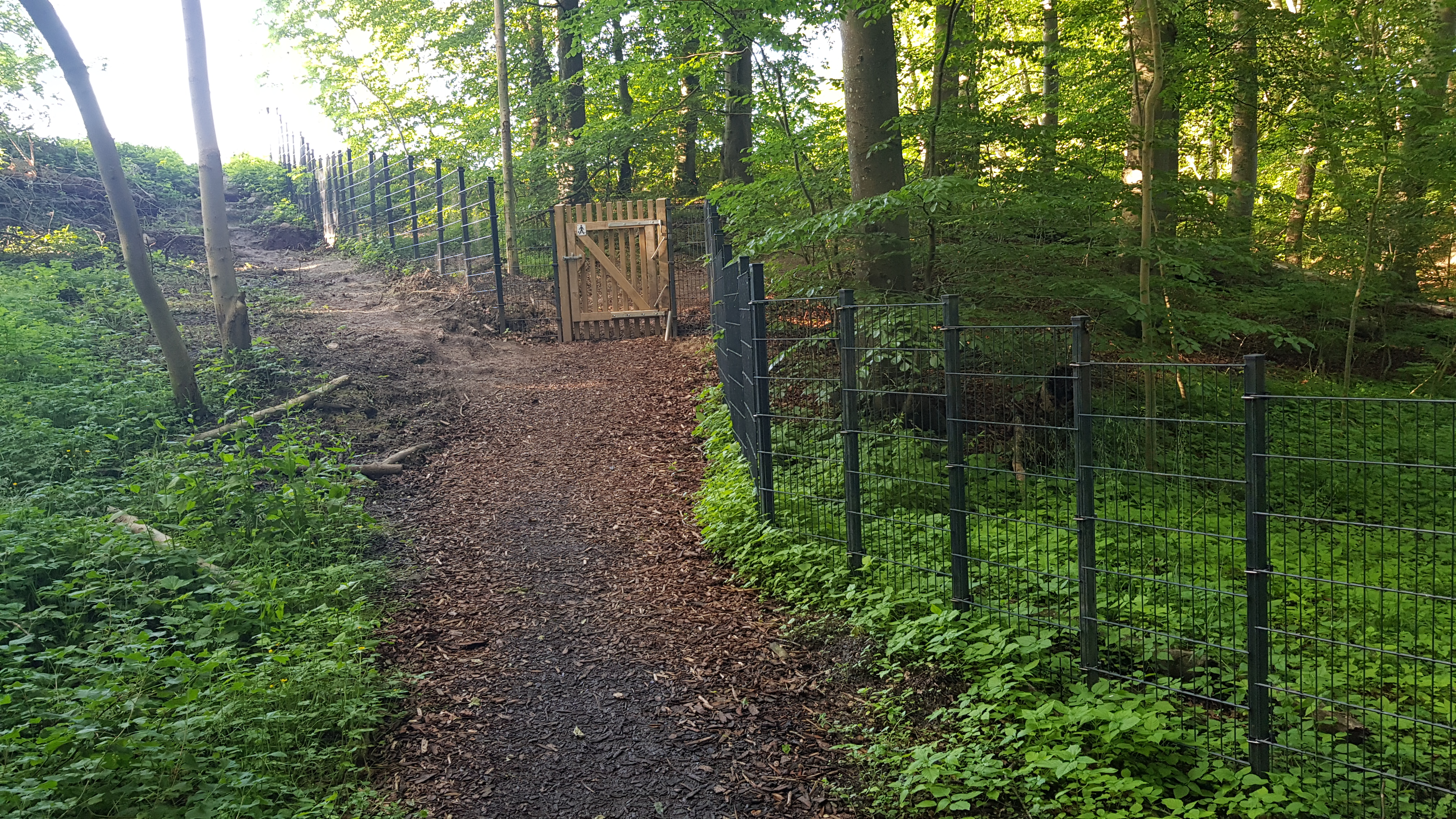
Gendarmstien passing through the fence at Padborg

== Border crossings ==
=== Road ===
Image	Danish Road/Track Name	German Road/Track Name	Type of crossing	Border indicated by	Border checkpoint?	Coordinates
	Slusevej	-	Road	-	-	54.91115°N 8.63868°E
	Siltoftvej	-	Road	Old border checkpoint building	-	54.91131°N 8.6696°E
	Rudbølvej	Rosenkranzer-Straße	Road	National speed limits sign	Yes	54.89669°N 8.75033°E
	Møllehusvej	(L6) Landesstraße 6	Road	National speed limits sign	-	54.90608°N 8.83231°E
	-	Marschbahn	Track	-	-	54.89938°N 8.87289°E
	Primærrute 11 Sønder Løgum Landevej	B 5 Bundesstraße 5	Road	National speed limits sign	Yes	54.90385°N 8.91034°E
	Vindtvedvej	-	Road	Small sign showing municipality	-	54.89996°N 8.96273°E
	Beierskrovej	Beyersweg	Road	Small sign showing municipality	-	54.88975°N 8.99681°E
	Pebersmarkvej	(L313) Pepersmarker Weg	Road	National speed limits sign	Yes	54.87165°N 9.07882°E
	Grænsevejen	Bögelhuus	Road	National speed limits sign	-	54.87303°N 9.14207°E
	Sofiedalvej	Zur Fehle	Road	National speed limits sign	-	54.84984°N 9.24032°E
	Kristiansmindevej	Wilmkjerweg	Road	Small sign showing municipality	-	54.80309°N 9.29032°E
	E45 Sønderjyske Motorvej	A 7 Bundesautobahn 7 (Ellund Autobahn GZG)	Road	National speed limits sign	Yes	54.80574°N 9.32817°E
	Industrivej (Padborg)	(L17) Landesstraße 17	Road	National speed limits sign	Yes	54.81615°N 9.36112°E
	Fredericia–Flensborg-banen	Bahnstrecke Fredericia–Flensburg	Track	-	-	54.81525°N 9.36301°E
	Haraldsvej	-	Walking path	-	-	54.8172°N 9.36373°E
	Rønsdamvej	-	Walking path	Red-white boom barrier	-	54.8338°N 9.37583°E
	-	-	Walking path	-	-	54.83876°N 9.38521°E
	Sekundærrute 170 Flensborgsvej (Kruså)	B 200 Bundesstraße 200	Road	National speed limits sign	Yes	54.83956°N 9.40443°E
	Madeskovvej	Teichweg	Walking path	-	-	54.8422°N 9.40712°E
	Skomagerhusvej	Dammweg	Walking path	-	-	54.83198°N 9.42032°E

=== Rail ===
There are two railway lines across the land border:

- The main route is via the Fredericia–Padborg/Flensburg–Padborg lines, which cross the eastern part of the land border between Padborg and Flensburg. This route, which is electrified, is operated by EuroCity (EC), EuroNight (EN) and regional trains of DSB. The line also used to carry CityNightLine trains.
- The western part of the land border is crossed by the Marsh Railway line between Tønder and Süderlügum. This line is not electrified, and is therefore operated by DMUs and diesel locomotive hauled trains.

A third route, the Vogelfluglinie (lit. 'bird flight line' in German), which included a train ferry over the countries' maritime border (between Rødby and Puttgarden), closed in December 2019. Until then, this route carried EuroCity and ICE services.

The Fehmarn Belt Fixed Link is a planned rail and road tunnel across the Fehmarnbelt.

== See also ==
- Denmark–Germany relations
