= Fredericia–Padborg railway line =

Railway line in Denmark

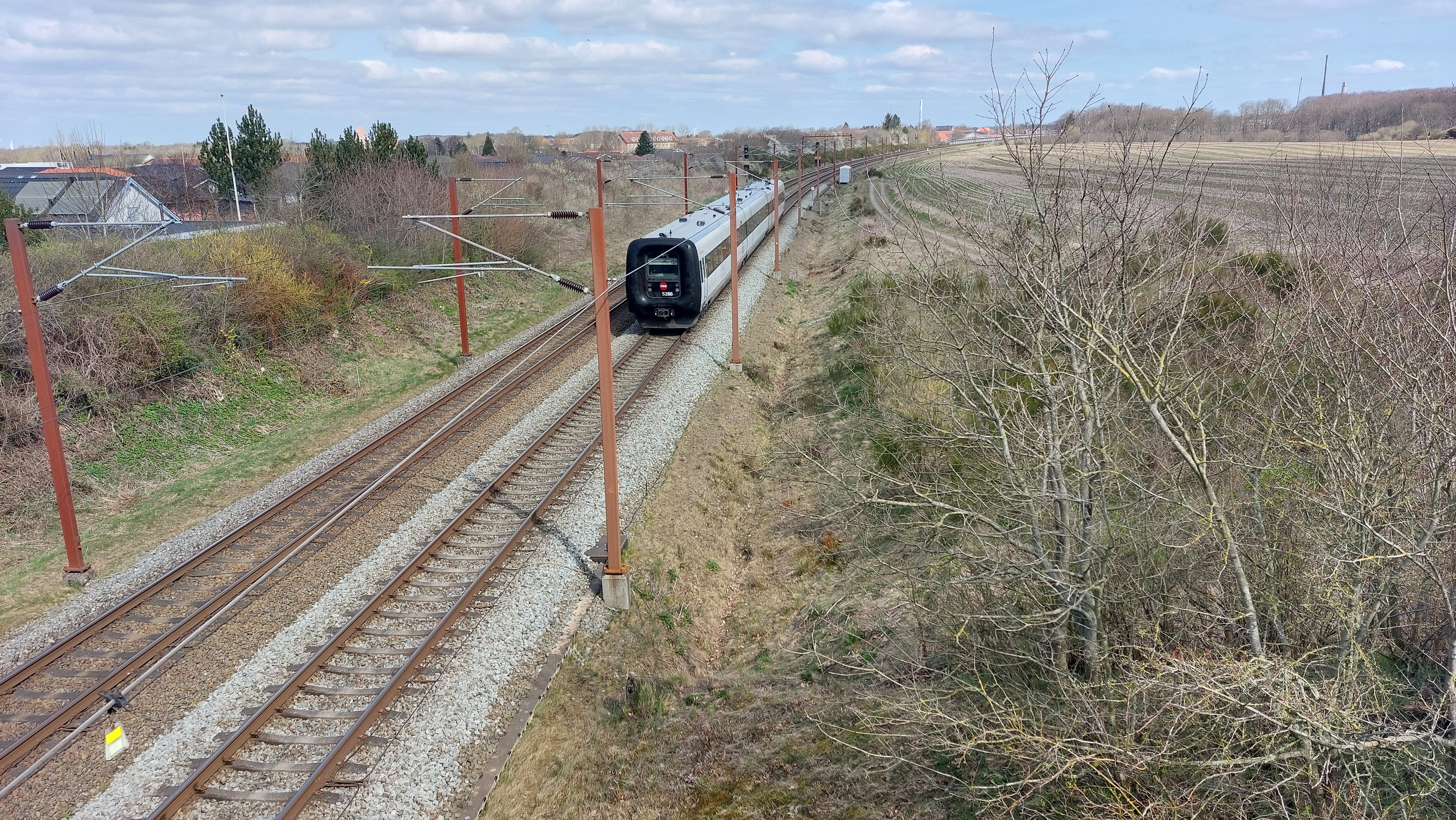
- The Fredericia–Padborg railway line near Vamdrup in 2022

Overview
- Native name: Fredericia-Padborg-banen
- Status: Operational
- Owner: Banedanmark
- Line number: 26
- Termini: Fredericia; Padborg
- Stations: 9

Service
- Type: Heavy rail
- System: Danish railway
- Operator(s): Danish State Railways

History
- Opened: 1 October 1864 (Padborg–Vojens); 1 November 1866 (Fredericia–Vamdrup); 1 November 1866 (Vamdrup–Vojens)

Technical
- Line length: 110.6 km (68.7 mi)
- Number of tracks: Double track (Fredericia–Tinglev); Single track (Tinglev–Padborg)
- Character: Passenger trains Freight trains
- Track gauge: 1,435 mm (4 ft 8 1/2 in) standard gauge
- Electrification: 25 kV AC 50 Hz
- Operating speed: 160 km/h (Fredericia–Vojens); 180 km/h (Vojens–Tinglev); 120 km/h (Tinglev–Padborg)
The Fredericia–Padborg railway line
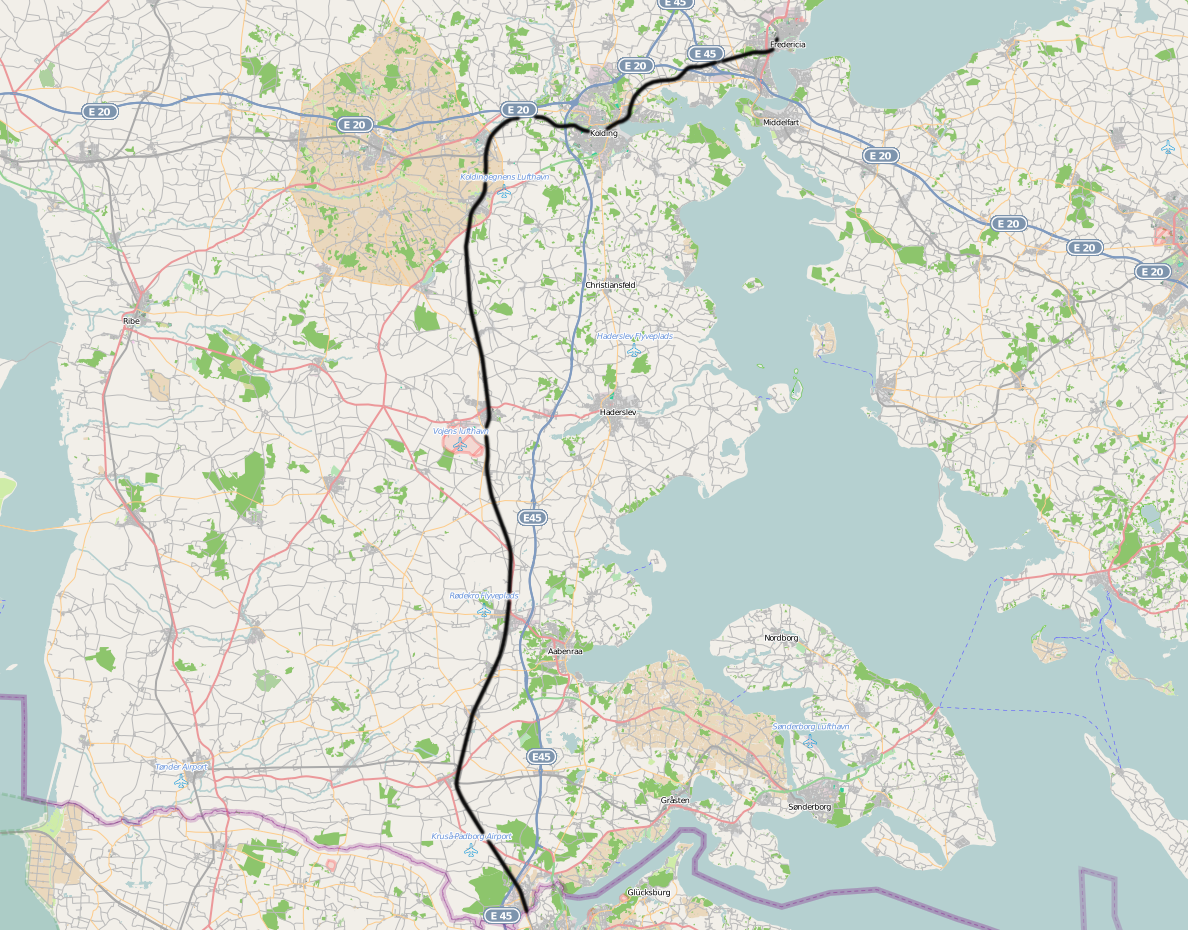

The Fredericia–Padborg railway line (Danish: Fredericia-Padborg-banen) is a 110.6 kilometres (68.7 mi) long railway line in Denmark which runs through the historical region of Southern Jutland between the city of Fredericia and the German border at Padborg. Being one of the main arteries of the Danish railway network, the standard gauge and fully electrified railway line is double track except for the section between Tinglev and Padborg which is single track.

The railway line constitutes the southernmost part of the East Jutland longitudinal railway line (Danish: Den Østjyske Længdebane), the through route along the east coast of the Jutland Peninsula from the port city of Frederikshavn in North Jutland to the German border at Padborg, where it connects to the Flensburg–Padborg railway line and the German railway network.

== Stations ==
- Fredericia, connection with the Copenhagen–Fredericia/Taulov railway line to Copenhagen and the Fredericia–Aarhus railway line to Aarhus
- Taulov, connection with the Copenhagen–Fredericia/Taulov railway line
- Kolding
- Lunderskov, starting point of the Lunderskov–Esbjerg railway line to Esbjerg
- Vamdrup, border station until 1920
- Vojens
- Rødekro
- Tinglev, starting point of the Tinglev–Sønderborg railway line to Sønderborg
- Padborg, border station from 1920, connection with the Flensburg–Padborg railway line to Flensburg and, through it, the Neumünster–Flensburg railway

== See also ==
- List of railway lines in Denmark
- Rail transport in Denmark
- History of rail transport in Denmark
- Denmark–Germany border
