= Padborg station =

Railway station in Padborg, Denmark

Coordinates: 54.8244°N 9.3592°E

Padborg
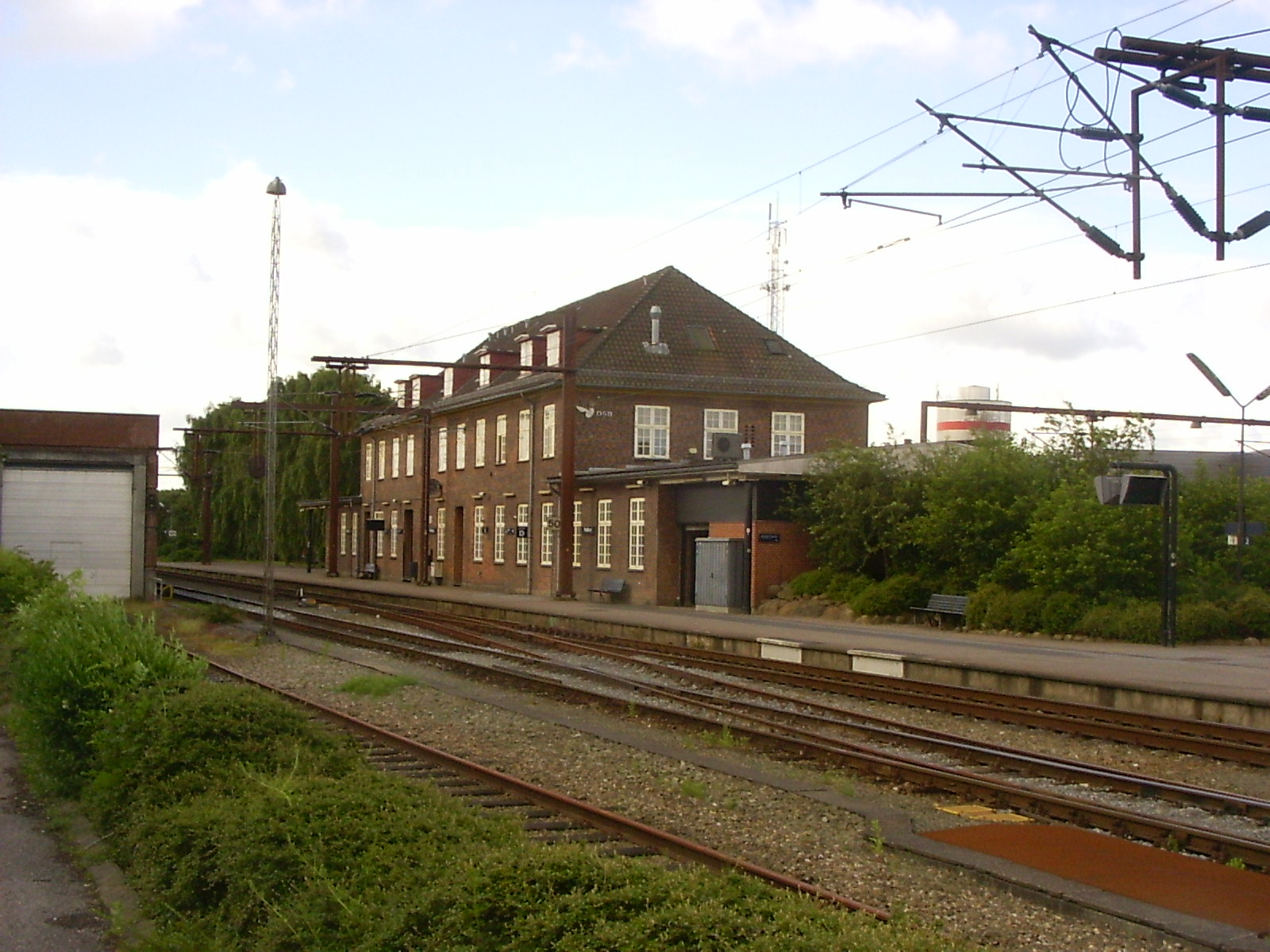
- Padborg station in 2014

General information
- Location: Jernbanegade 11; 6330 Padborg; Aabenraa Municipality; Denmark
- Elevation: 46.9 m (154 ft)
- Owner: DSB (station infrastructure); Banedanmark (rail infrastructure)
- Line: Fredericia–Flensburg
- Platforms: 1
- Tracks: 3
- Train operators: DSB

Other information
- Website: Official website

History
- Opened: 1 October 1864; 162 years ago

Services
| Preceding station | DB Fernverkehr | Following station |
|---|---|---|
| Terminus | ICE 4 Sprinter | Flensburg towards Frankfurt Airport Regional |
| Preceding station | České dráhy | Following station |
| Kolding towards Copenhagen Central | Railjet | Schleswig towards Praha hl.n. |
| Preceding station | DSB | Following station |
| Kolding towards Copenhagen Central | Copenhagen–Odense–Hamburg EuroCity | Schleswig towards Hamburg Hbf |
| Tinglev towards Fredericia | Fredericia–Flensburg InterCity | Flensburg Terminus |
| Preceding station | SJ | Following station |
| Odense towards Stockholm C | EuroNight | Hamburg Hbf towards Hamburg Hbf or Berlin Hbf |
Location

Padborg station is a railway station in the Danish town of Padborg in the southern part of Jutland. The station is located on the Fredericia–Flensburg railway line and is the last Danish train station before the border with Germany which lies immediately south of the station. To the west, Tønder in Denmark on the route to Niebull is a further border station.

== History ==
The station opened in 1864 and was located in the Prussian province of Schleswig-Holstein until 1920. It became a border station as a consequence of the 1920 Schleswig plebiscites which determined the current border between Denmark and Germany through the former Duchy of Schleswig.

Pre-Schengen, Padborg was where there was a large-scale checking of travelers passports, visas and / or other identity documents but this has disappeared after 2001 when Denmark became an active part of the Schengen Area. Temporarily since 2015, passports control is reintroduced. During COVID-19 pandemic, fairly much checks of border crossing certificates and vaccination documentation took place, although with more limited number of passengers.

Passenger traffic has especially gained momentum after EuroCity and EuroNight lines was created and developed. 2019–2028 the Vogelfluglinie is closed for rail traffic, so all trains between Copenhagen and Hamburg goes through Padborg.

== Operations ==
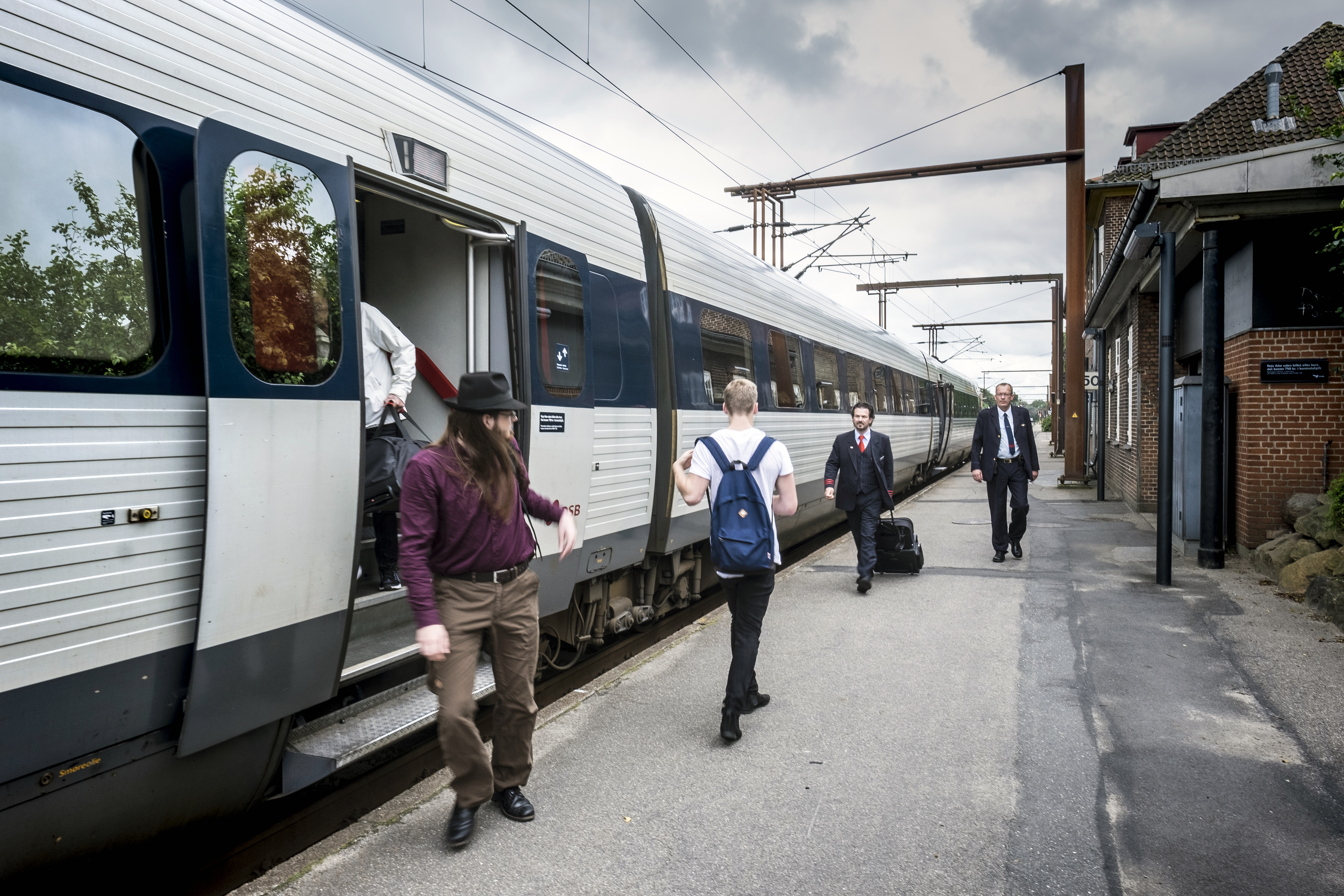
DSB train calling at Padborg station in 2016.

A five times (more in summer) daily Copenhagen-Hamburg service is operated by DSB and calls here, supplemented by a few services of DSB trains Copenhagen-Flensburg and Aarhus-Hamburg. Padborg has facilities to allow change of locomotives. Both locomotives equipped only for Danish electrical system and those equipped only for German electrical system can go to Padborg. This is much used for freight trains, and for the overnight sleepers Malmö-Berlin and Stockholm-Hamburg which do not allow passengers to board/disembark in Padborg.

== Facilities ==
The extensive station building has no booking office (self-service ticket machines available) but has a waiting room and toilet facilities. Office space in the station building is used by a number of railfreight companies as Padborg retains extensive railway marshalling yards north of the passenger station.

== See also ==
- List of railway stations in Denmark
- Rail transport in Denmark
- Denmark–Germany border
