= Copenhagen–Fredericia/Taulov Line =

Railway line in Denmark

Coordinates: 55.4593°N 11.9206°E

København – Fredericia / Taulov
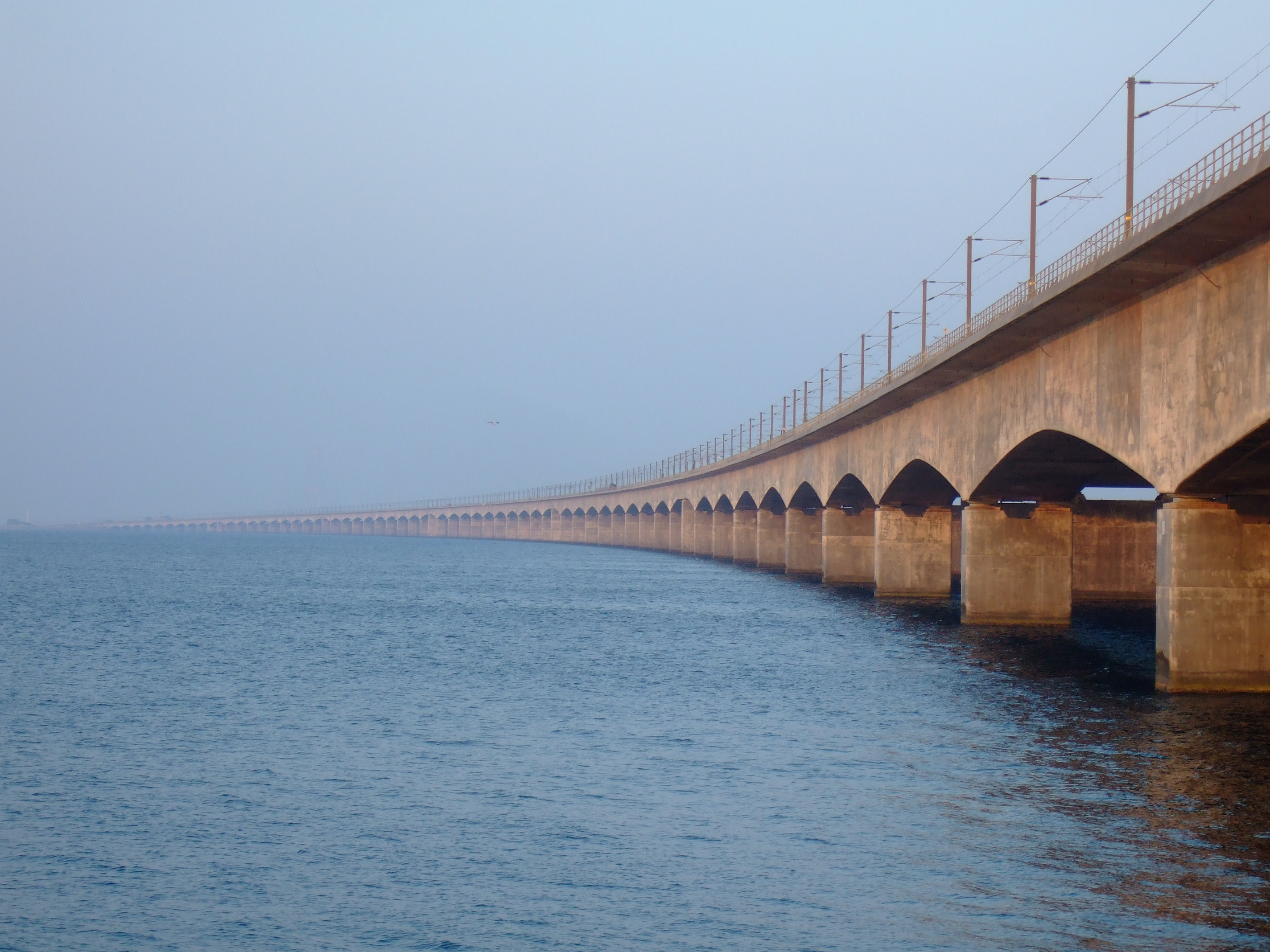
- The Copenhagen–Fredericia Line crossing the Great Belt by the Great Belt Bridge.

Overview
- Termini: Copenhagen Central; Fredericia, Taulov

Service
- Type: Main line
- Operator(s): DSB; Railion; CFL Cargo

Technical
- Line length: 220.6 km (Fredericia branch); 222.6 km (Taulov branch)
- Number of tracks: Double; Quadruple (Høje Taastrup–Roskilde)
- Track gauge: 1,435 mm (4 ft 8 1/2 in)
- Electrification: 25 kV 50 Hz AC
- Operating speed: 160 km/h 180 km/h (certified multiple units only)

The Copenhagen–Fredericia/Taulov Line is the Danish railway line between the capital, Copenhagen, and the Jutland peninsula by way of the islands of Zealand and Funen. It is administered by Banedanmark and has a length of about 220 kilometres (140 mi). Being one of the main arteries of the Danish railway network, it has double track and is fully electrified.

The line is composed of the railway line across Zealand (the West Line) and the main line across Funen (the Funen Main Line), both of which were built during the mid-19th century. Originally connected by the Great Belt ferries, these two lines were joined in 1997 by the Great Belt Fixed Link.

== History ==
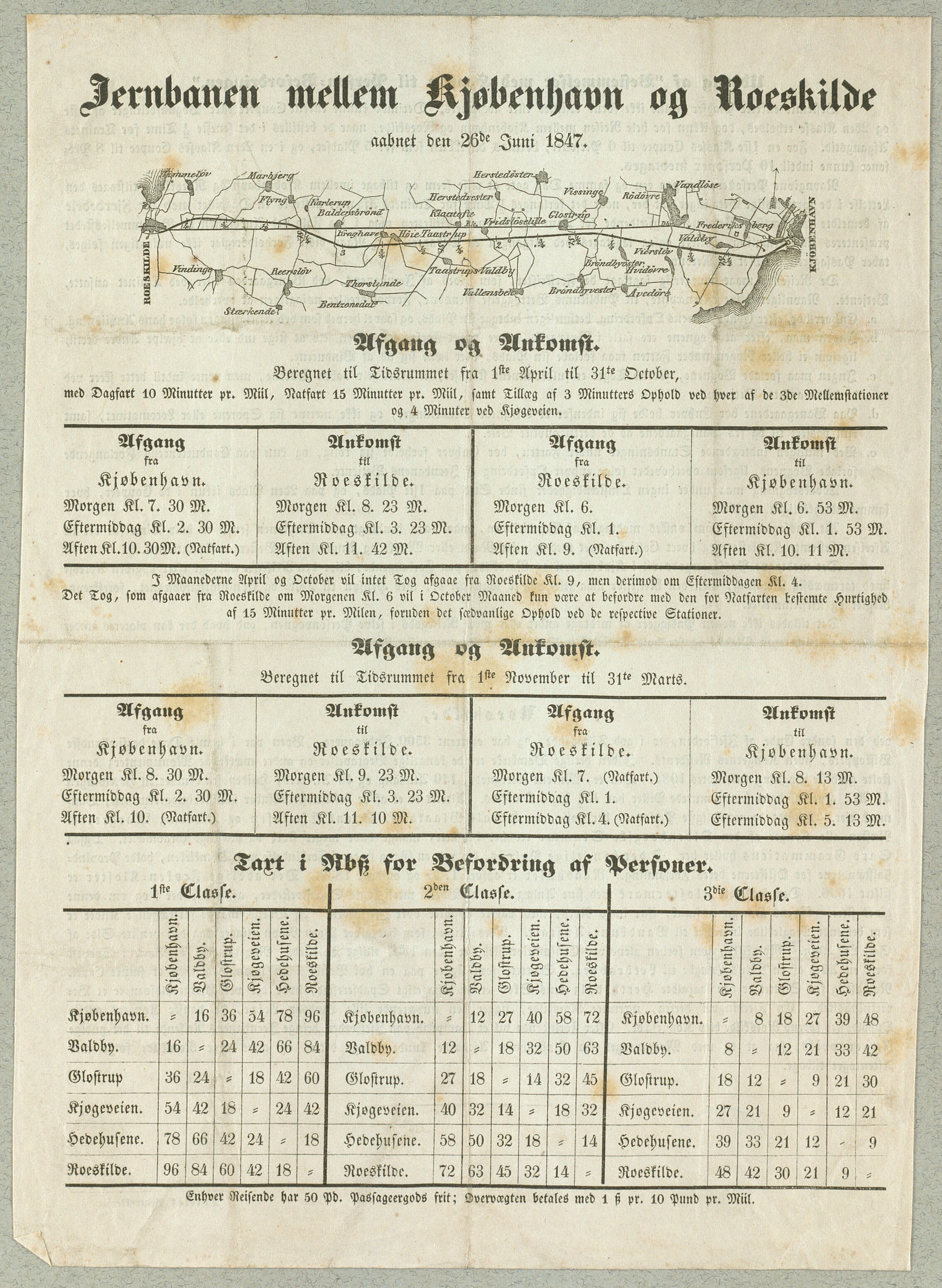
Early timetable of the Copenhagen–Roskilde railway line.

The first section of the railway line, the railway line from Copenhagen to Roskilde, opened in 1847 as the first railway line in the Kingdom of Denmark. (Note: The first railway line in the then Danish Monarchy was the Kiel-Altona railway line in the Duchy of Holstein which had been completed three years earlier. However, Holstein was later lost to the Kingdom of Prussia after the Second Schleswig War in 1864, and that railway line is today part of the German rail network.) It was built for the privately owned Det Sjællandske Jernbaneselskab (English: the Zealand Railway Company) by British engineering company William Radford. The railway line was ceremonially opened on 26 June 1847, and the following day the railway opened to regular traffic with three trains daily in each direction. The Copenhagen–Roskilde railway line was prolonged from Roskilde to the port city of Korsør by the Great Belt in 1856.

The railway line across the island of Funen from Nyborg by the Great Belt via Odense to Middelfart by the Little Belt opened in 1865. It was built by the civil engineering partnership Peto, Brassey and Betts. The socalled Queen Louise's Railway was inaugurated on Queen Louise's 48th birthday the 7 September 1865, with regular traffic commencing the following day. In Middelfart, passengers could catch the steam ferry across the Little Belt to Snoghøj in the Jutland peninsula. The following year, on 1 november 1866, a short branch line, the Middelfart–Strib railway line, opened from Middelfart to the harbour at Strib 5 kilometers north of Middelfart, from where there was connection via railway ferry across the Little Belt to Fredericia in Jutland.

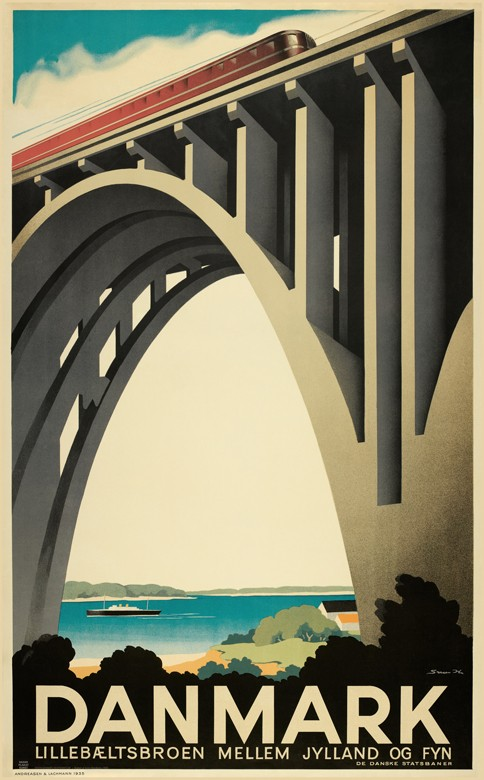
Poster from the inauguration of the Little Belt Bridge in 1935 by Sven Henriksen.

In 1935, with the opening of the Little Belt Bridge between Middelfart and Snoghøj, The Funen Main Line was connected directly to the railway network in Jutland at Fredericia.

Originally connected by the Great Belt ferries across the Great Belt, the railway lines across Zealand (the West Line) and Funen (the Funen Main Line) were joined in 1997 by the Great Belt Fixed Link.

== Connections to other lines ==
- Being connected to Copenhagen, there are transfers to the S-train network, the Coast Line and the Oresund Railway.
- Roskilde station is linked to the Northwest Line and the Little South Line).
- The South Line joins the line at Ringsted (see also Fugleflugtslinjen).
- Slagelse station is a terminus for the Tølløse Line, operated by regional trains.
- The Svendborg Line starts at Odense station.
- The Fredericia–Aarhus Line continues northward through Jutland at Fredericia station.
- The Snoghøj–Taulov segment is a direct connection to the Fredericia–Padborg Line, avoiding the need to change direction at Fredericia.

== Cultural references ==
=== In music ===
For the opening of the Copenhagen–Roskilde railway line in 1847, the Danish composer Hans Christian Lumbye composed the still popular Copenhagen Steam Railway Galop, a musical composition which faithfully recreates the sounds of a train chugging out of a station and grinding to a halt at the next stop. The Copenhagen Steam Railway Galop was included in the 2006 Danish Culture Canon as a masterpiece of Danish classical music.

=== In visual art ===
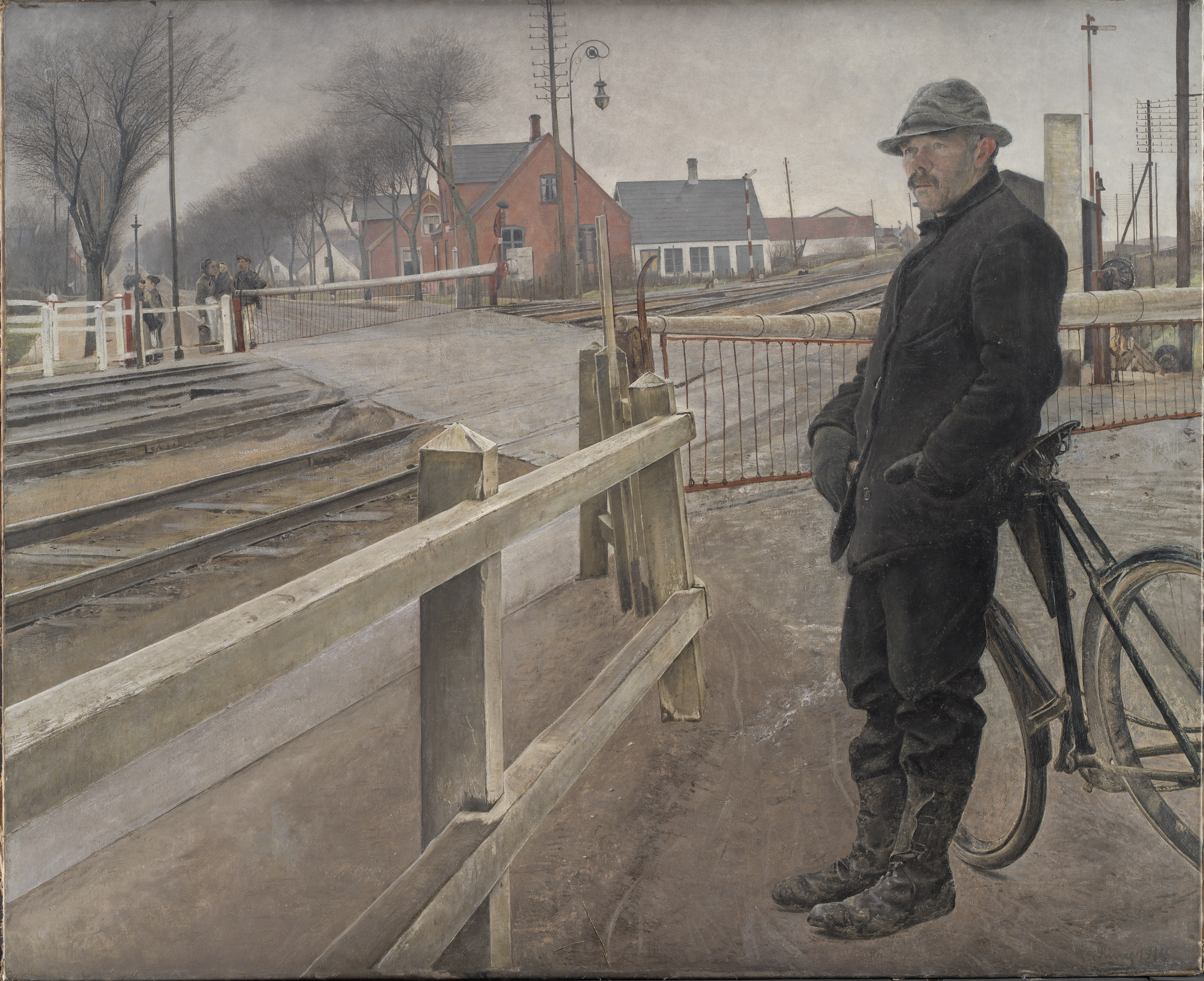
While waiting for the train. Painting by L. A. Ring, 1914.

The level crossing of the Copenhagen–Roskilde railway line and Roskilde Landevej at Hedehusene railway station is the motive of the 1914 painting Når toget ventes (English: While waiting for the train) by the Danish painter L. A. Ring, one of the foremost Danish painters of the turn of the 20th century, who pioneered both symbolism and social realism in Denmark.

== See also ==
- List of railway lines in Denmark
- Rail transport in Denmark
- History of rail transport in Denmark
- Transport in Denmark
