= Middelfart railway station =

Railway station in Funen, Denmark

Middelfart
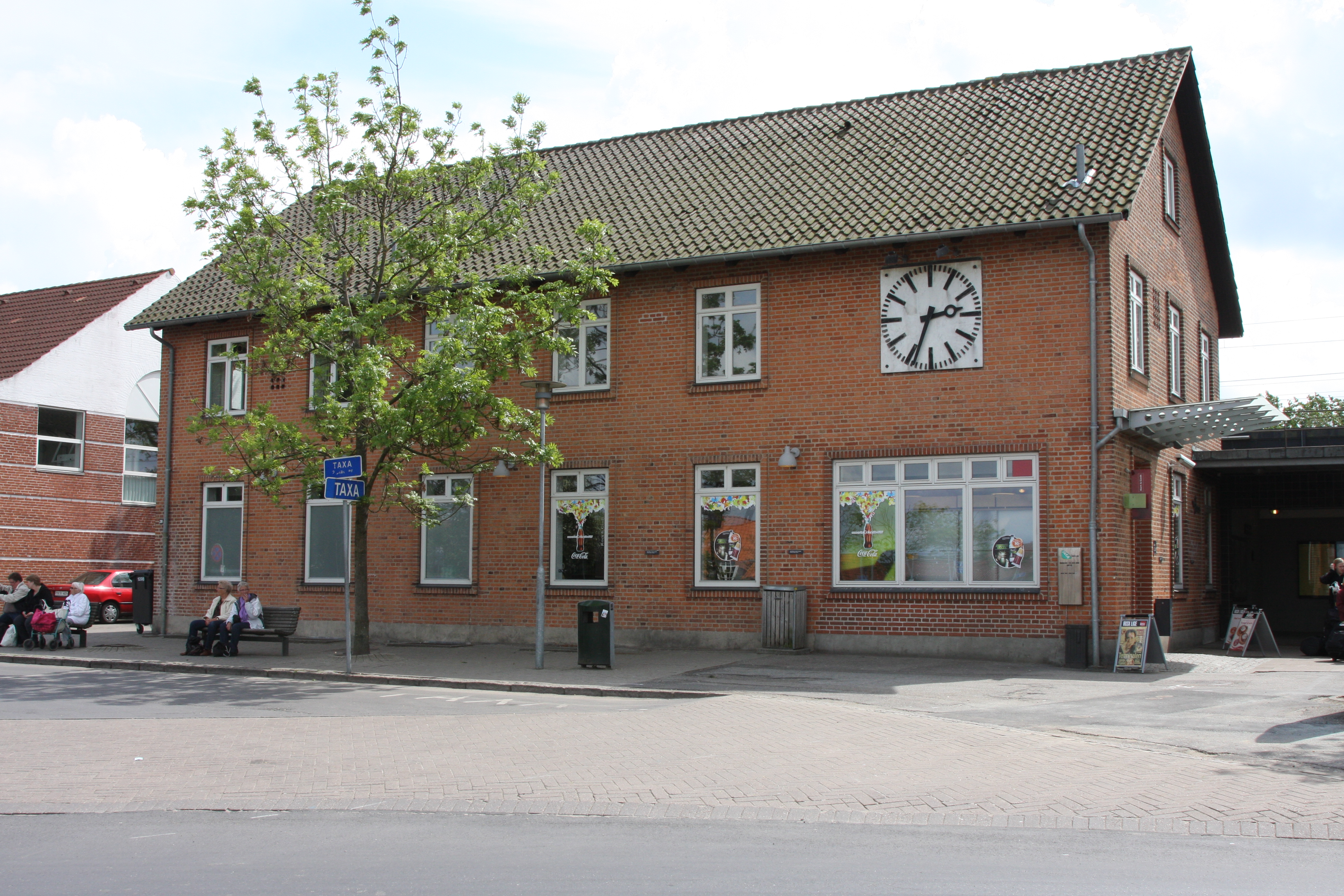
- Street facade of Middelfart station in 2009

General information
- Location: Jernbanegade 39; DK-5500 Middelfart; Middelfart Municipality; Denmark
- Coordinates: 55°30′5″N 9°44′10″E
- Elevation: 10.4 metres (34 ft)
- Owner: DSB (station infrastructure); Banedanmark (rail infrastructure)
- Lines: Copenhagen–Fredericia; Middelfart–Strib (closed 1995)
- Platforms: 2
- Tracks: 3
- Train operators: DSB

Construction
- Architect: Knud Tanggaard Seest (1935)

History
- Opened: 7 September 1865
- Rebuilt: 1935

Services
Preceding station	DSB	Following station
Odense towards Copenhagen Central	Copenhagen-Aalborg InterCity	Fredericia towards Aalborg Airport
Odense towards Østerport	Copenhagen–Esbjerg InterCity	Kolding towards Esbjerg
Kauslunde towards Odense	Odense–Fredericia Regional train	Fredericia Terminus
Location

Middelfart railway station (Danish: Middelfart Station or Middelfart Banegård) is a railway station serving the town of Middelfart on the western part of the island of Funen, Denmark. It is located in the centre of the town, on the southern edge of the historic town centre.

Middelfart station is located on the main line Copenhagen–Fredericia railway from Copenhagen to Funen and Jutland. The station offers direct InterCity services to Copenhagen, Funen and Jutland, regional rail services to Fredericia and Odense operated by the national railway company DSB.

The current station is the second station in Nyborg. The first station in the town opened in 1865 as the western terminus of the Funen Main Line between Nyborg and Middelfart via Odense. The original station was the terminus of the Middelfart–Strib railway line, a short branch line to the harbour at Strib from where there was connection via railway ferry across the Little Belt to Fredericia in the Jutland peninsula. Middelfart station was moved to its current location in 1935 with the opening of the Little Belt Bridge. Its second and current station building from 1935 was designed by the architect Knud Tanggaard Seest.

== History ==
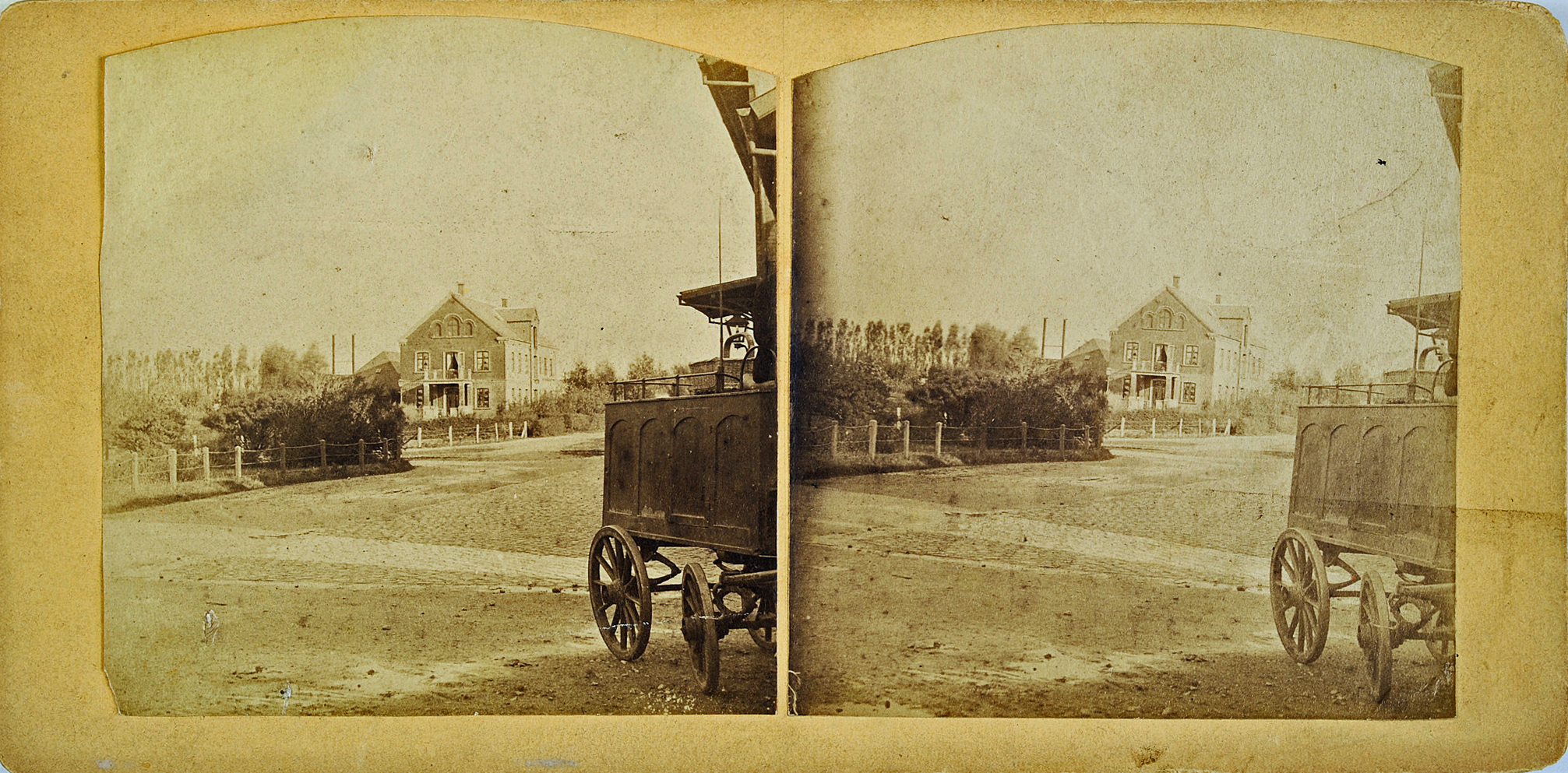
The old station in Middelfart, 1888.

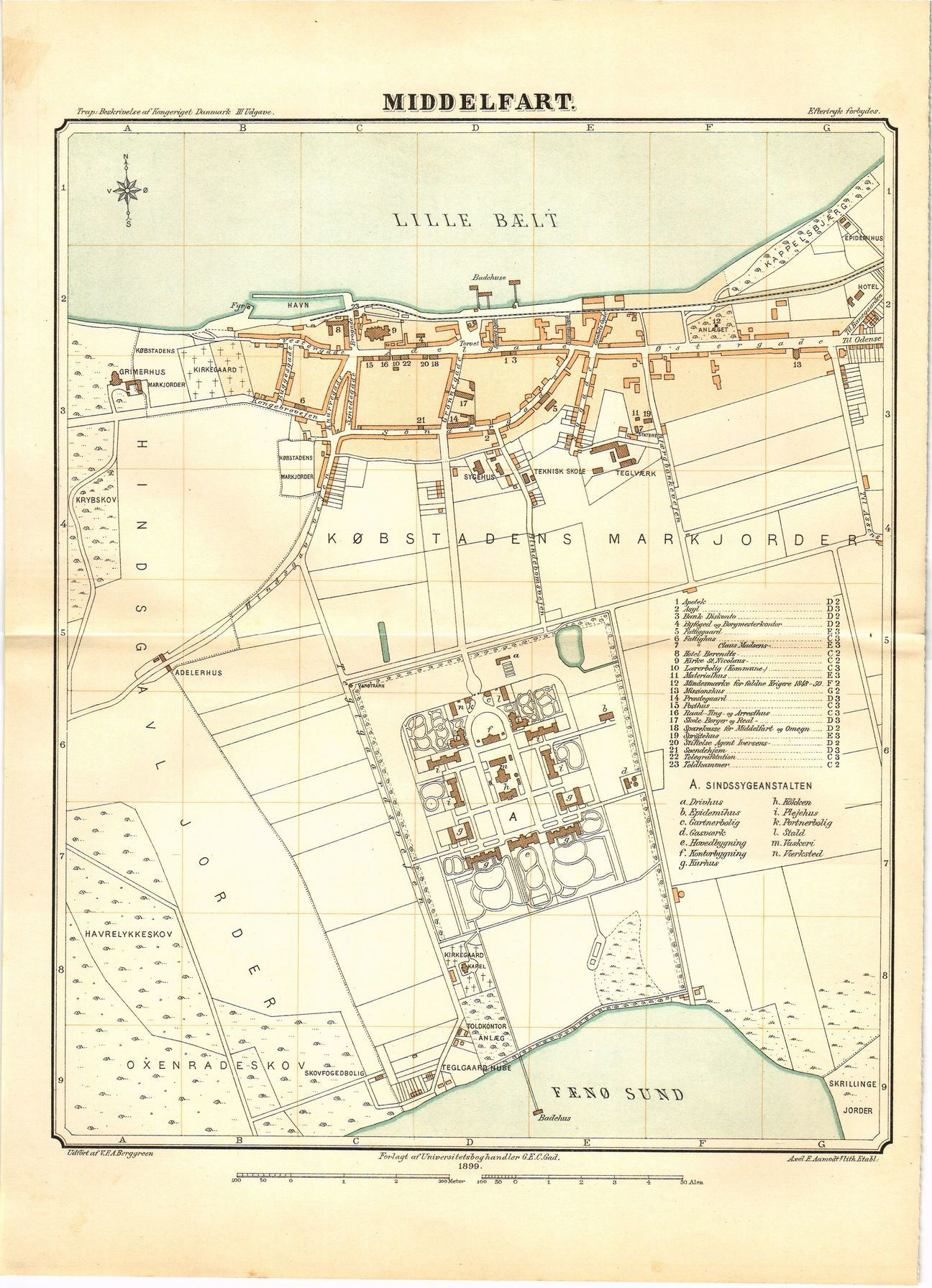
Map of Middelfart, 1899.

The current station is the second station in Middelfart. The first station in the town opened in 1865 as the western terminus of the so-called Queen Louise's Railway, the main line across the island of Funen between Nyborg and Middelfart via Odense. The station was inaugurated along with the railway line on Queen Louise's 48th birthday the 7 September 1865, with regular traffic commencing the following day.

The following year, on 1 november 1866, a short branch line, the Middelfart–Strib railway line, opened from Middelfart station to the harbour at Strib 5 kilometers north of Middelfart, from where there was connection via railway ferry across the Little Belt to Fredericia in the Jutland peninsula.

In 1935, with the opening of the Little Belt Bridge, Middelfart station was moved to its current location.

== Architecture ==
The second and current station building from 1935 was designed by the Danish architect Knud Tanggaard Seest who was the head architect of the Danish State Railways from 1922 to 1949.

== See also ==
- Transportation in Denmark
- Rail transport in Denmark
- History of rail transport in Denmark
- List of railway stations in Denmark
- Danish State Railways
- Banedanmark
