= Fredericia station =

Railway station in Fredericia, Denmark

Fredericia
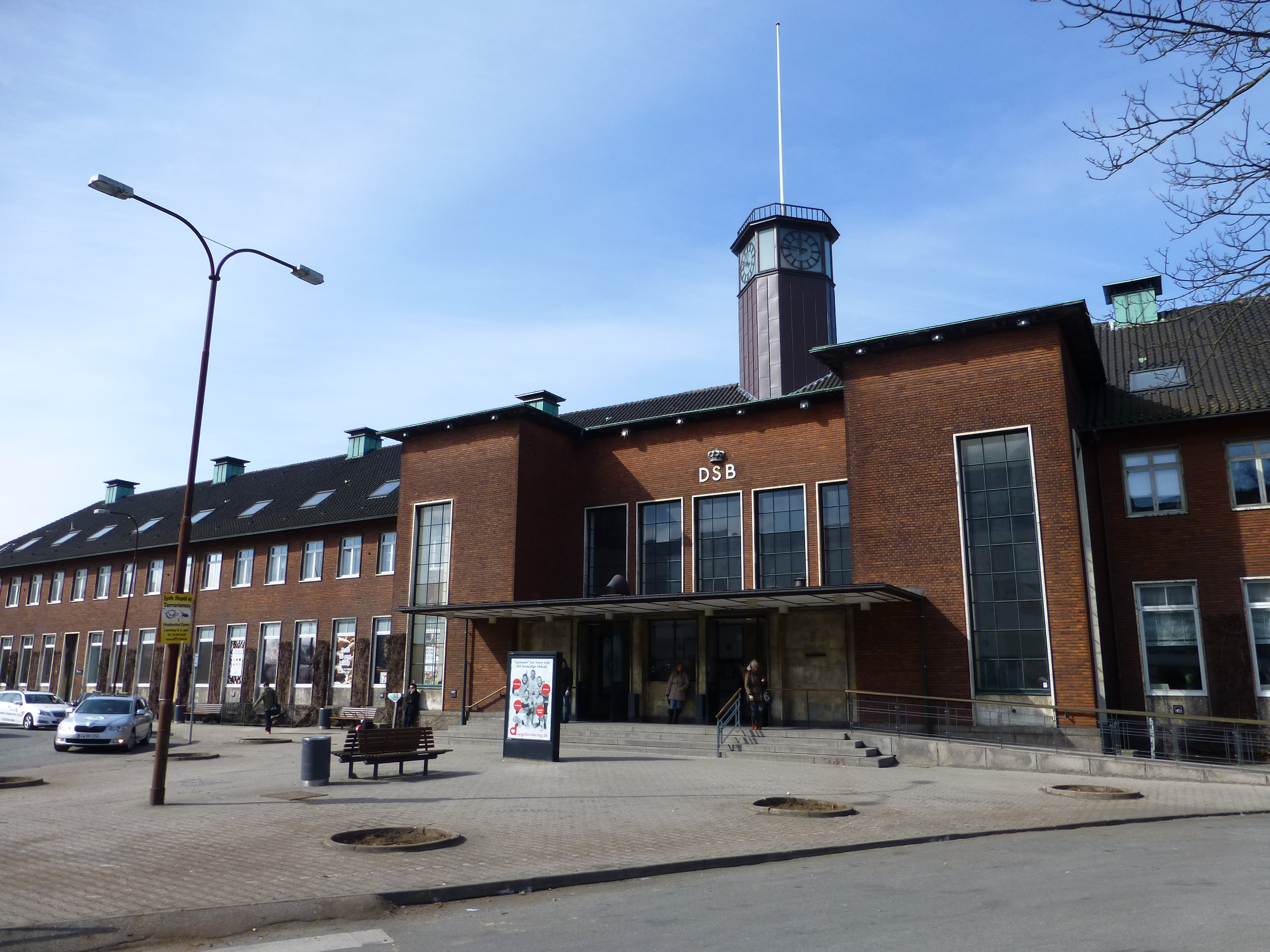
- Fredericia Station in 2013

General information
- Location: Jernbanegade 2B; 7000 Fredericia; Fredericia Municipality; Denmark
- Coordinates: 55°34′06″N 9°44′22″E
- Elevation: 8.5 metres (28 ft)
- Owner: DSB (station infrastructure); Banedanmark (rail infrastructure)
- Lines: Copenhagen-Fredericia Line; Fredericia-Aarhus Line; Flensburg-Fredericia Line
- Platforms: 4
- Tracks: 7
- Train operators: DSB

Construction
- Architect: Knud Tanggaard Seest

History
- Opened: 14 May 1935

Services
| Preceding station | DSB | Following station |
|---|---|---|
| Odense towards Copenhagen Airport | Copenhagen-Aalborg InterCityLyn | Vejle towards Aalborg Airport |
| Odense towards Copenhagen Airport | Copenhagen-Herning-Struer InterCityLyn | Vejle towards Struer |
| Odense towards Copenhagen Airport | Copenhagen-Sønderborg InterCityLyn | Kolding towards Sønderborg |
| Middelfart towards Copenhagen Central | Copenhagen-Aalborg InterCity | Vejle towards Aalborg Airport |
| Kolding towards Esbjerg | Esbjerg–Aalborg InterCity | Vejle towards Aalborg |
| Terminus | Fredericia–Flensburg InterCity | Kolding towards Flensburg |
| Middelfart towards Odense | Odense–Fredericia Regional train | Terminus |
| Taulov towards Esbjerg | Esbjerg-Aarhus Regional train | Børkop towards Aarhus Central |
Location

Fredericia station (Danish: Fredericia Banegård or Fredericia Station) is a railway station serving the city of Fredericia in Jutland, Denmark.

Fredericia station is an important railway junction where the Copenhagen-Fredericia Line, the Fredericia-Aarhus Line, and the Flensburg-Fredericia Line all cross each other. The station was opened in 1935 together with the opening of the Little Belt Bridge across the Little Belt. The train services are operated by the railway company DSB.

== History ==
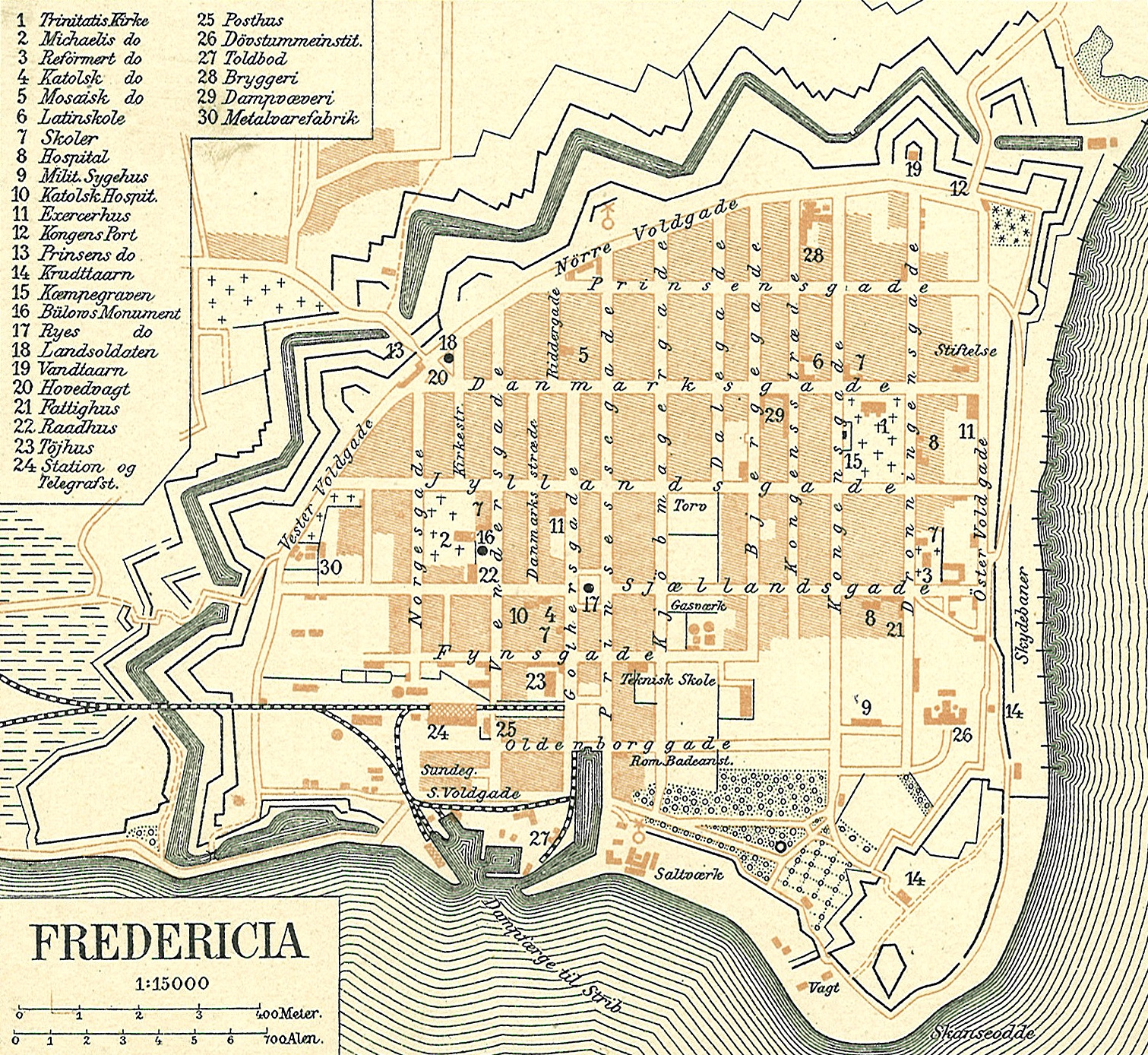
Map of Fredericia in 1900. The old terminal station and the adjacent ferry slips can be seen at the bottom left.

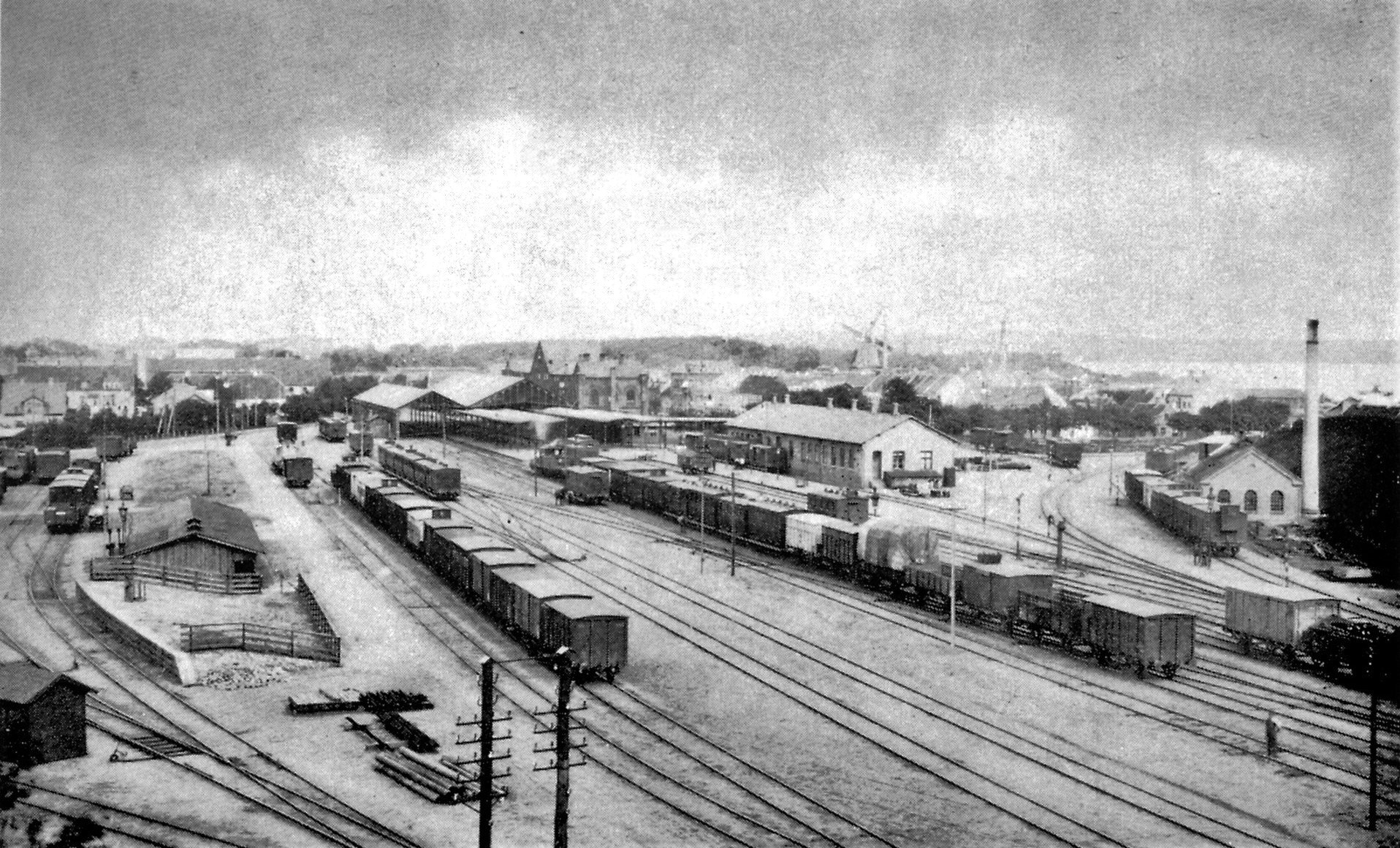
The first station in Fredericia in 1900

The current station is the second in Fredericia. It replaced the first station, which had been opened in 1866 and was located by the harbour from where there had been a connection via railway ferry across the Little Belt to Strib on the island Funen. The current station was opened in 1935 together with the opening of the Little Belt Bridge across the Little Belt.

== Architecture ==
The second and present station building from 1935 in a functionalist style with a touch of Nordic Classicism was designed by the Danish railway architect Knud Tanggaard Seest who was the head architect of the Danish State Railways from 1922 to 1949.

The station is one of only five in Denmark with a train shed covering the tracks and platforms. (Note: The others are Copenhagen Central Station, Aarhus Central Station, Nørrebro S-train Station, and the now-closed train station in Gedser.) The old station at the harbour also had a train shed, which has been demolished.

== See also ==
- List of railway stations in Denmark
- Rail transport in Denmark
