= Kolding railway station =

Railway station in Kolding, Denmark

Kolding
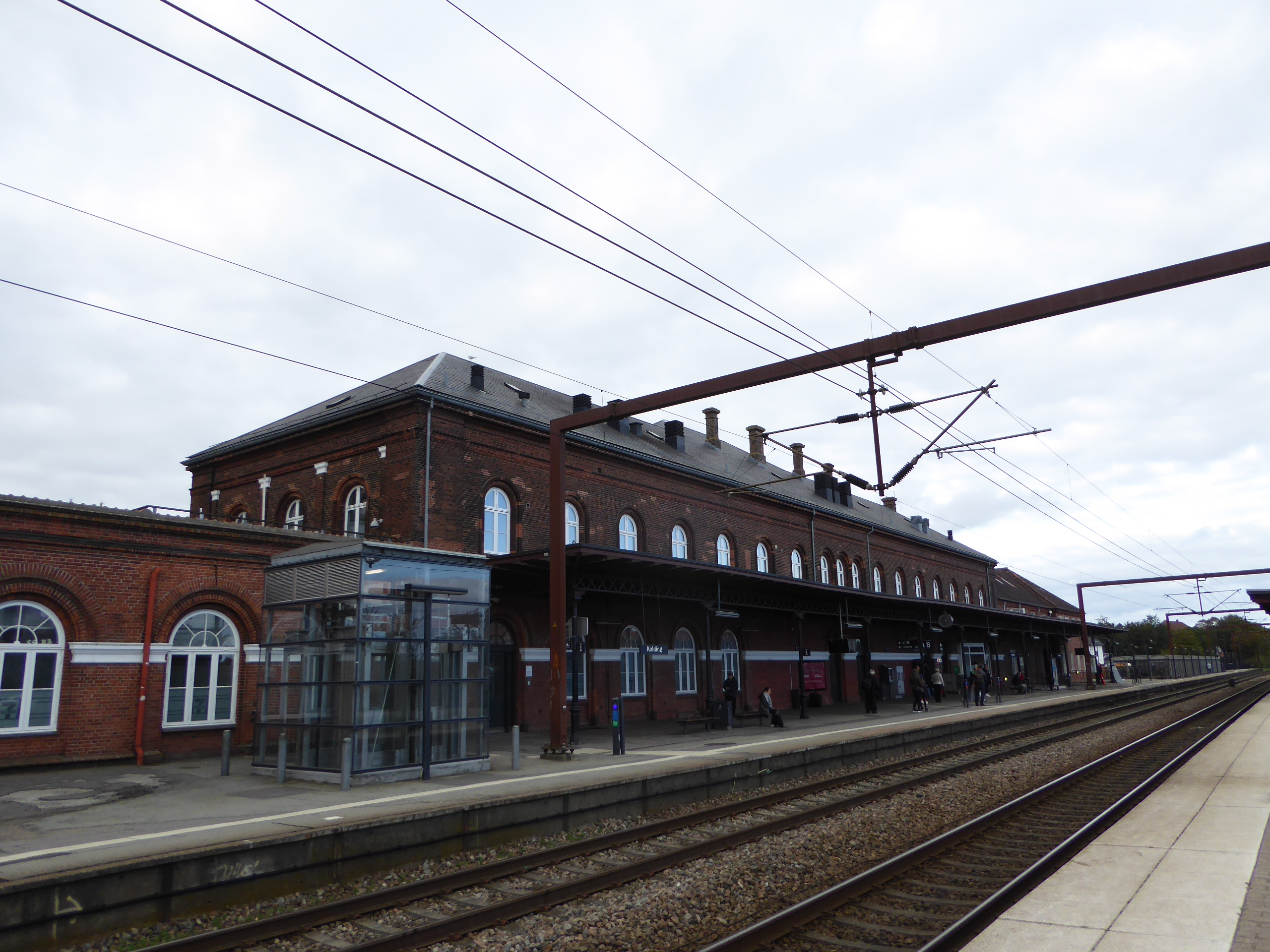
- Kolding station in 2018

General information
- Location: Banegårdspladsen 4; 8000 Kolding; Kolding Municipality; Denmark
- Coordinates: 55°29′28.01″N 9°28′58″E
- Elevation: 3.3 metres (11 ft)
- Owner: DSB (station infrastructure); Banedanmark (rail infrastructure)
- Line: Fredericia–Padborg
- Platforms: 2
- Tracks: 3
- Train operators: DSB

Construction
- Architect: Niels Peder Christian Holsøe (1866); Thomas Arboe (1884)

Other information
- Website: Official website

History
- Opened: 1 November 1866
- Rebuilt: 1882–1884

Services
Preceding station	DSB	Following station
Odense towards Copenhagen Central	Copenhagen–Odense–Hamburg EuroCity	Padborg towards Hamburg Hbf
Fredericia towards Copenhagen Airport	Copenhagen-Sønderborg InterCityLyn	Lunderskov towards Sønderborg
Middelfart towards Østerport	Copenhagen–Esbjerg InterCity	Vejen towards Esbjerg
Taulov towards Aalborg	Aalborg–Esbjerg InterCity	Lunderskov towards Esbjerg
Fredericia Terminus	Fredericia–Flensburg InterCity	Lunderskov towards Flensburg
Preceding station	České dráhy	Following station
Odense towards Copenhagen Central	Railjet	Padborg towards Praha hl.n.
Location

Kolding station (Danish: Kolding Banegård or Kolding Station) is a railway station serving the city of Kolding in Denmark. It is located in central Kolding, situated between the historic town centre and the Port of Kolding, and immediately adjacent to the Kolding bus station.

Kolding station is located on the Fredericia–Padborg railway line. The station opened in 1866, and the current station building was completed in 1884. It offers direct InterCity services to Copenhagen, Hamburg, Sønderborg, Aarhus, and Esbjerg, as well as regional train services to Fredericia and Esbjerg.

== Architecture ==
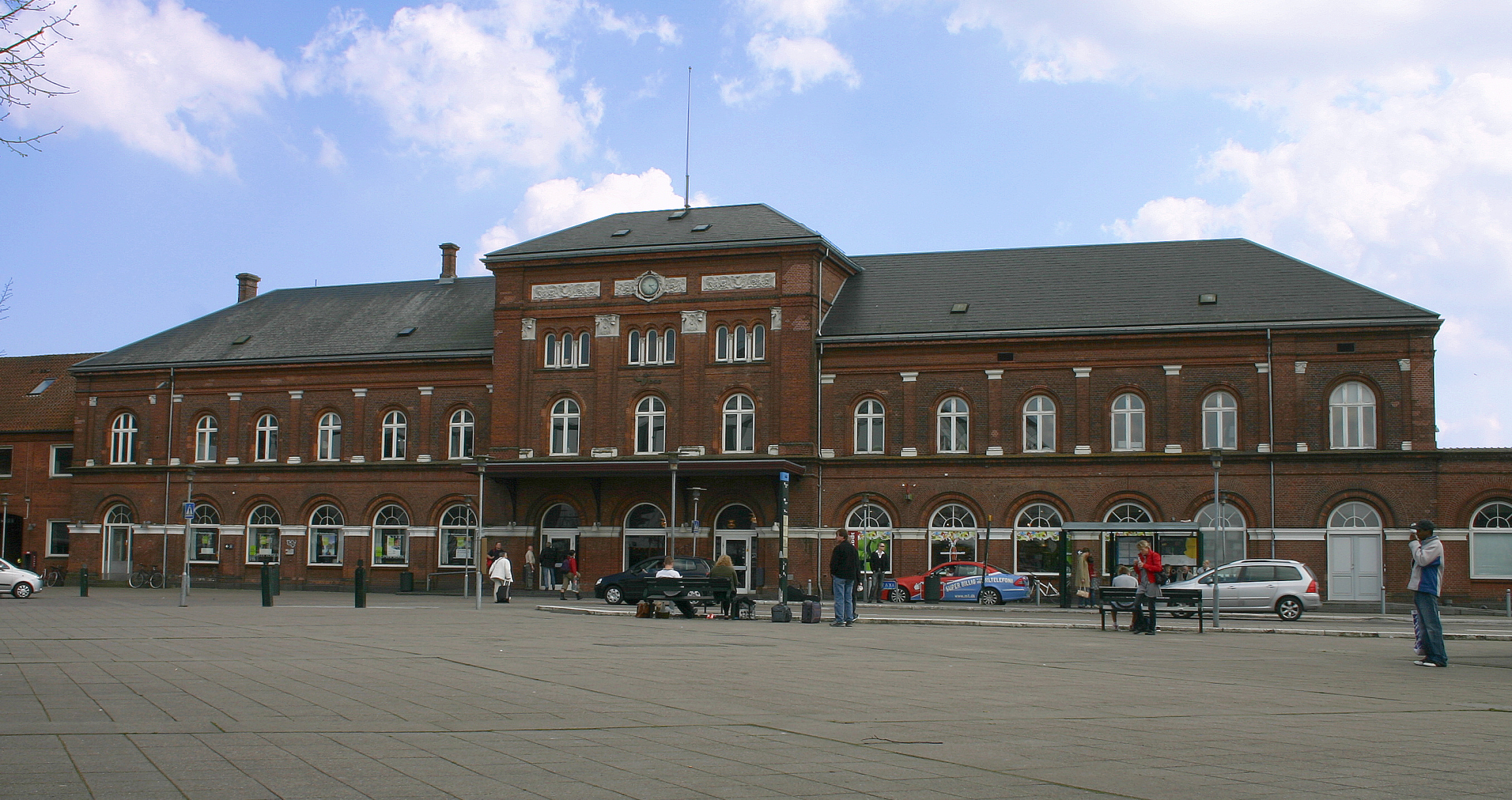
Street facade of Kolding station in 2008.

Kolding station's original station building from 1866 was built to designs by the Danish architect Niels Peder Christian Holsøe (1826–1895).

The still existing station building from 1884 was built to designs by the Danish architect Thomas Arboe (1836–1917), known for the numerous railway stations he designed across Denmark in his capacity of head architect of the Danish State Railways.

== See also ==
- List of railway stations in Denmark
- Rail transport in Denmark
- History of rail transport in Denmark
- Transport in Denmark
