= Flensburg station =

Railway station in Flensburg, Germany

Flensburg
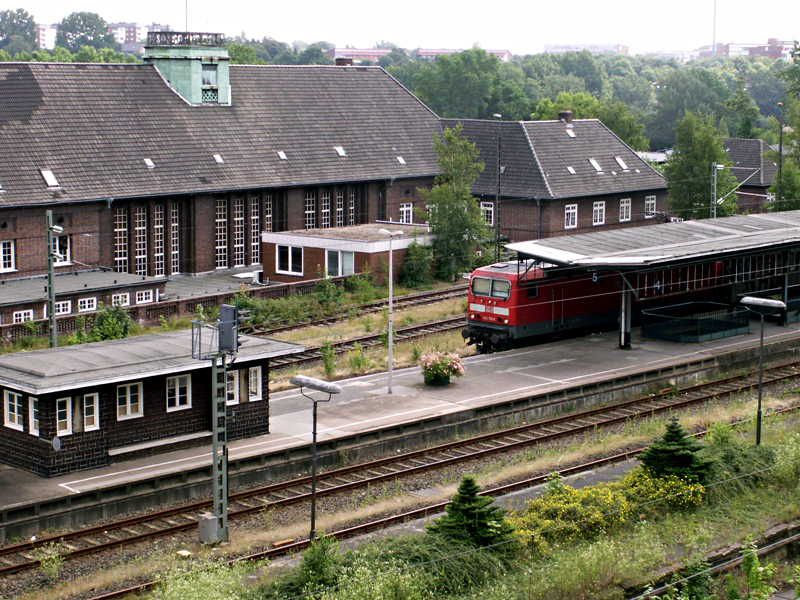

General information
- Location: Am Bundesbahnhof 5, Flensburg, Schleswig-Holstein; Germany
- Coordinates: 54°46′28″N 9°26′12″E
- Owner: Deutsche Bahn
- Operator: DB Station&Service
- Lines: Fredericia–Flensburg (km 176.2/0.0); Kiel–Flensburg (km 80.6) (KBS 146); Neumünster–Flensburg (km 176.2) (KBS 131)
- Platforms: 4

Construction
- Accessible: Yes

Other information
- Station code: 1810
- DS100 code: AF
- IBNR: 8000103
- Category: 3
- Website: www.bahnhof.de

History
- Opened: 1 February 1927

Services
Preceding station	DB Fernverkehr	Following station
Schleswig towards Frankfurt Airport Regional	ICE 4 Sprinter	Padborg Terminus
Preceding station	DSB	Following station
Terminus	Fredericia–Flensburg InterCity	Padborg towards Fredericia
Preceding station	DB Regio Nord	Following station
Tarp towards Hamburg Hbf	RE 7	Terminus
Preceding station		Following station
Terminus	RE 72	Husby towards Boren-Lindaunis Schleibrücke Nord
Location

Flensburg station (German: Bahnhof Flensburg; Danish: Flensborg Banegård) is the main station of the town of Flensburg in the German state of Schleswig-Holstein. The station is located some distance from the city centre in the Südstadt district in southern Flensburg, just south of the Innenstadt district.

Flensburg station is an important junction station, and lines run from it to Kiel, to Hamburg via Schleswig and Neumünster and to Fredericia in Denmark. The station also handles cross-border rail traffic between Germany and Denmark.

The first station in Flensburg opened in 1854 and was located in the city centre. It was moved to its current location in 1927. Between December 2007 and December 2015, Flensburg was connected to Deutsche Bahn's Intercity Express network. In December 2025 it was reconnected to the ICE network with a daily ICE sprinter to Hamburg and Frankfurt.

== History ==
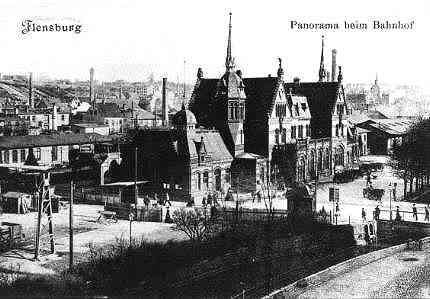
Old Flensburg station in 1900

On 1 April 1854 the Flensburg–Tönning line was opened by the British entrepreneur, Sir Samuel Morton Peto to a station outside the city at Holzkrug. On 4 October, its station in the city was opened, which became known as the English Station (Englischer Bahnhof). This station was at the south end of Flensburg Fjord in the Flensburg old town and was formally handed over for operations on 25 October by the Danish king, Frederik VII.

Ten years later, in 1864, the line was extended to Vojens in North Schleswig (now in Denmark) and soon after to Fredericia. In 1869, the current, shorter route to Hamburg via Schleswig and Rendsburg was put into operation.

In 1883 the original, simple station building was replaced by a more complex design of Johannes Otzen, a famous church architect. The original station was subsequently converted into Germany's first bus station. On 1 February 1927, the present station was inaugurated outside Flensburg’s old town, on the North Schleswig Loop, which avoids the old Flensburg terminal station. Trains to and from Denmark run over a loop, which is several kilometres long, to reach the station. The station in the town built in 1883 became a freight yard and was later closed.

Passenger services were closed on the line to Husum via Löwenstedt in 1959. In 1981, the last service ran on the line to Niebüll.

== Operations ==
=== Station facilities ===
The Flensburg station is a collection of brick expressionism of the 1920s and some of its outbuildings are partially protected as monuments.

=== Routes ===
- Neumünster–Flensburg railway
- Kiel–Flensburg railway
- Flensburg–Fredericia railway
- Flensburg–Niebüll railway (until 1981)
- Flensburg–Husum railway (until 1959)
- Flensburg Port Railway (only freight)

=== Tracks ===
The station has several tracks, but only four of them have access to a platform. The tracks were electrified in 1996 and the track were renumbered, with track 5 near the reception building and track 1, furthest away from the main station building, unusually in Germany.

In normal usage platforms are used as follows:

- platform track 5: regional trains to and from Neumünster
- platform track 4: regional trains to and from Kiel
- platform track 2: long distance and regional trains to and from Neumünster/Hamburg as well as to Denmark
- platform track 1: long distance and regional trains to and from Neumünster/Hamburg as well as to Denmark

=== Rail services ===
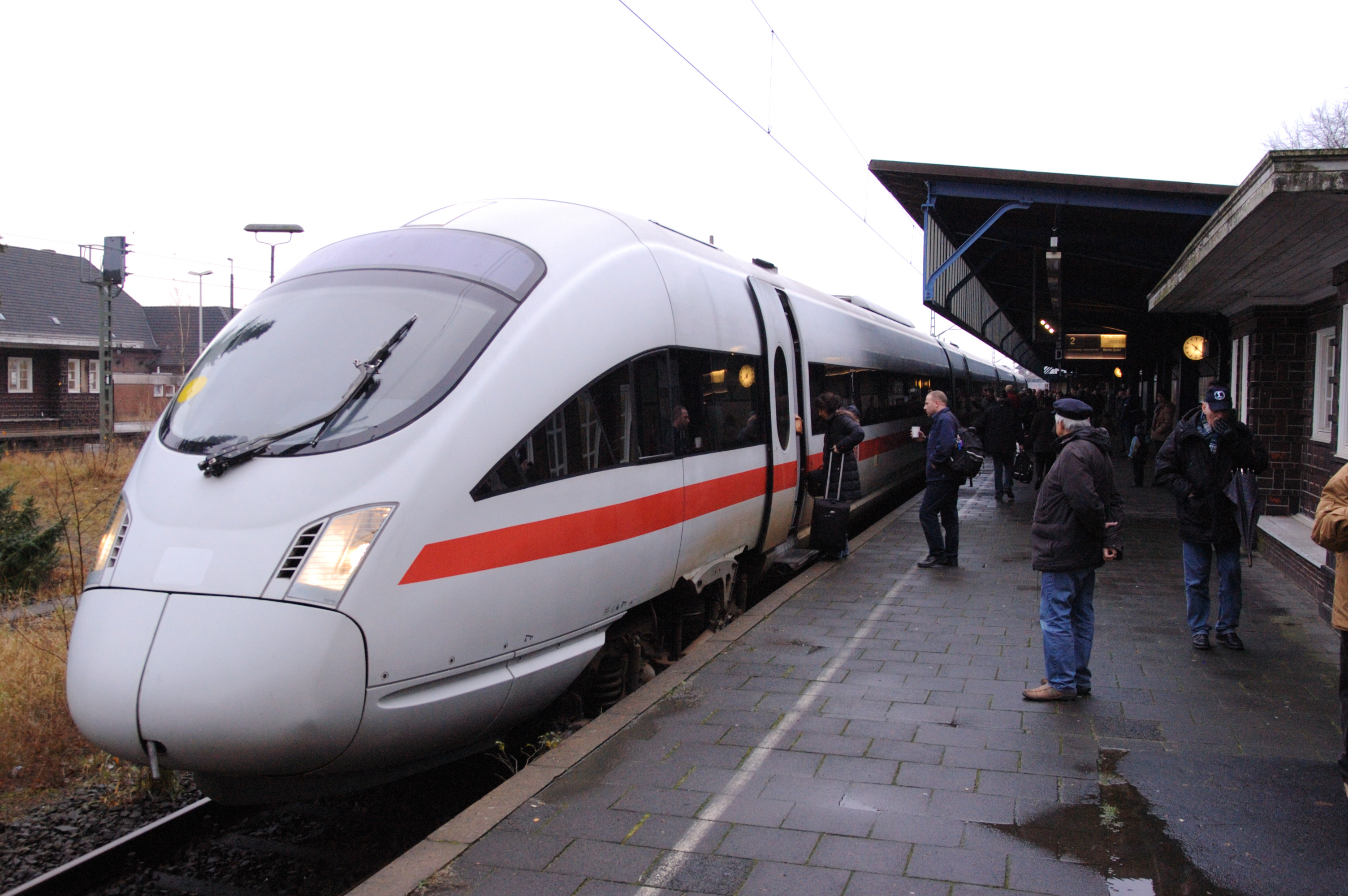
On 9 December 2007 an ICE-TD from Aarhus to Berlin-Ostbahnhof, the first scheduled ICE to stop at Flensburg station

In long-distance transport, a Eurocity service runs from Aarhus to Hamburg via Flensburg. These operate as Intercity services in Germany.

DB Regio Nord operates Regional-Express and Regionalbahn services between Neumünster and Hamburg every hour.

The Flensburg–Boren-Lindaunis Schleibrücke Nord route is currently also operated by Nordbahn every hour.

Line	Route	Frequency	Operator
ICE 4	Frankfurt Airport Regional – Frankfurt – Hanover – Hamburg – Flensburg – Padborg	One train pair	DB Fernverkehr
RJ 27	Flensburg – Hamburg – Berlin – Dresden – Prague	2 train pairs	DB Fernverkehr / České dráhy
ECE 75	Hamburg – Flensburg – Padborg – Kolding – Odense – Ringsted – Copenhagen	Every 2 hours	DB Fernverkehr / DSB
IC 76	Flensburg – Padborg – Kolding – Fredericia	Every 2 hours	DSB
RE 7	Flensburg – Hamburg	Hourly	DB Regio Nord
RE 72	Flensburg – Eckernförde – Boren-Lindaunis Schleibrücke Nord	Hourly	nordbahn

== See also ==
- Rail transport in Germany
- Railway stations in Germany
