= Odense station =

Main railway station in Odense, Denmark

Odense
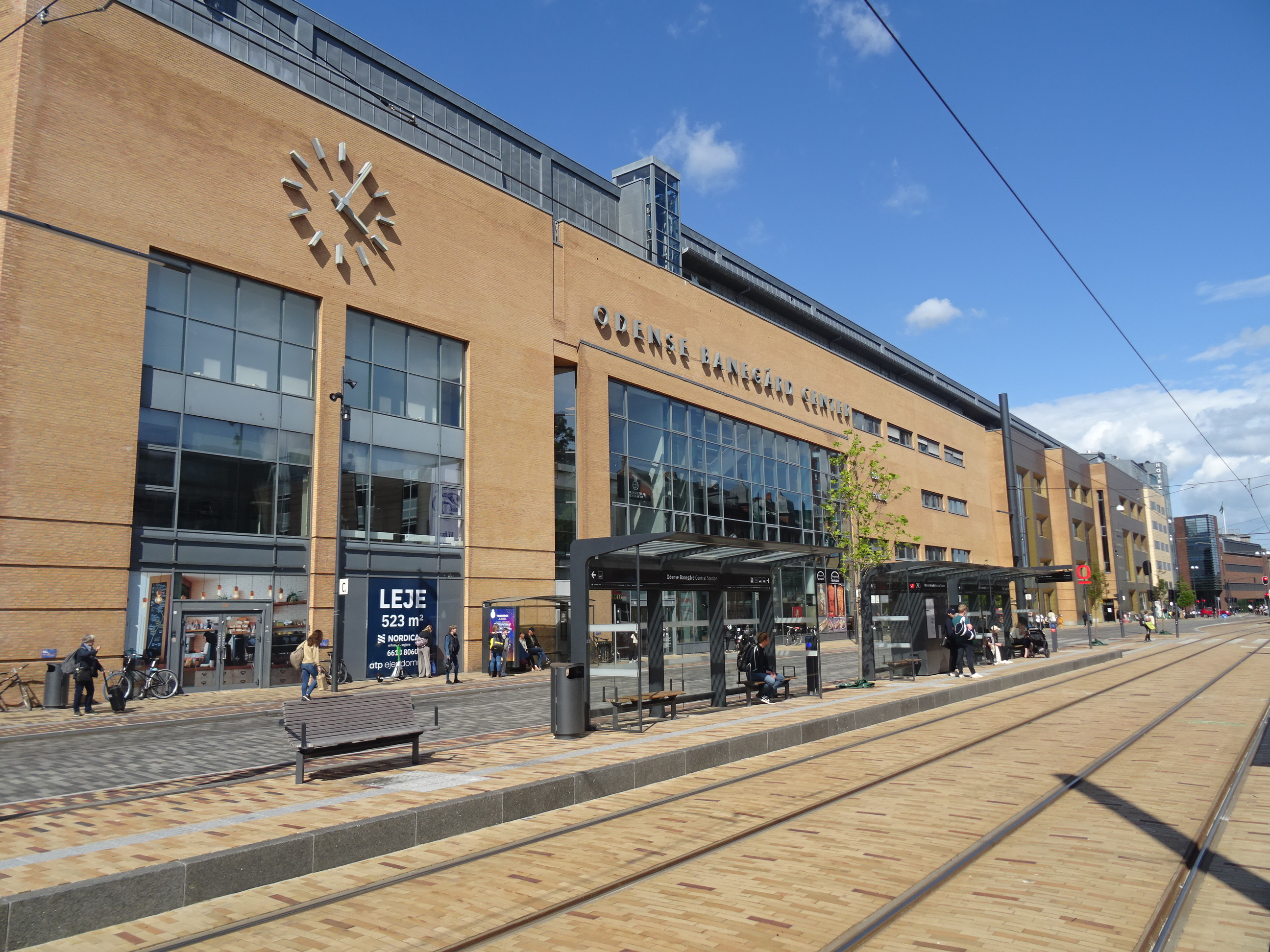
- Odense station at Østre Stationsvej

General information
- Location: Østre Stationsvej 27; 5000 Odense; Odense Municipality; Denmark
- Elevation: 13.1 metres (43 ft)
- Owner: DSB (station infrastructure); Banedanmark (rail infrastructure)
- Lines: Copenhagen–Fredericia; Odense–Svendborg
- Platforms: 3
- Tracks: 6
- Train operators: DSB

Construction
- Architect: Niels Peder Christian Holsøe (1865); Heinrich Wenck (1914)

History
- Opened: 1865; 161 years ago
- Rebuilt: 1914; 112 years ago 15 September 1995; 31 years ago
Location

Odense Station (Danish: Odense Banegård Center) is the main railway station serving the city of Odense, Denmark. It is located in central Odense, on the northern edge of the historic town centre, and lies immediately adjacent to the Odense bus station and a stop on the Odense Tramway.

Situated as a major station on the Copenhagen–Fredericia/Taulov line, it is also the terminus of the Svendborgbanen railway line between Odense and Svendborg. The first station in Odense, now demolished, opened in 1865 as the railway line across the island of Funen was completed. The current station building opened in 1995.

== History ==
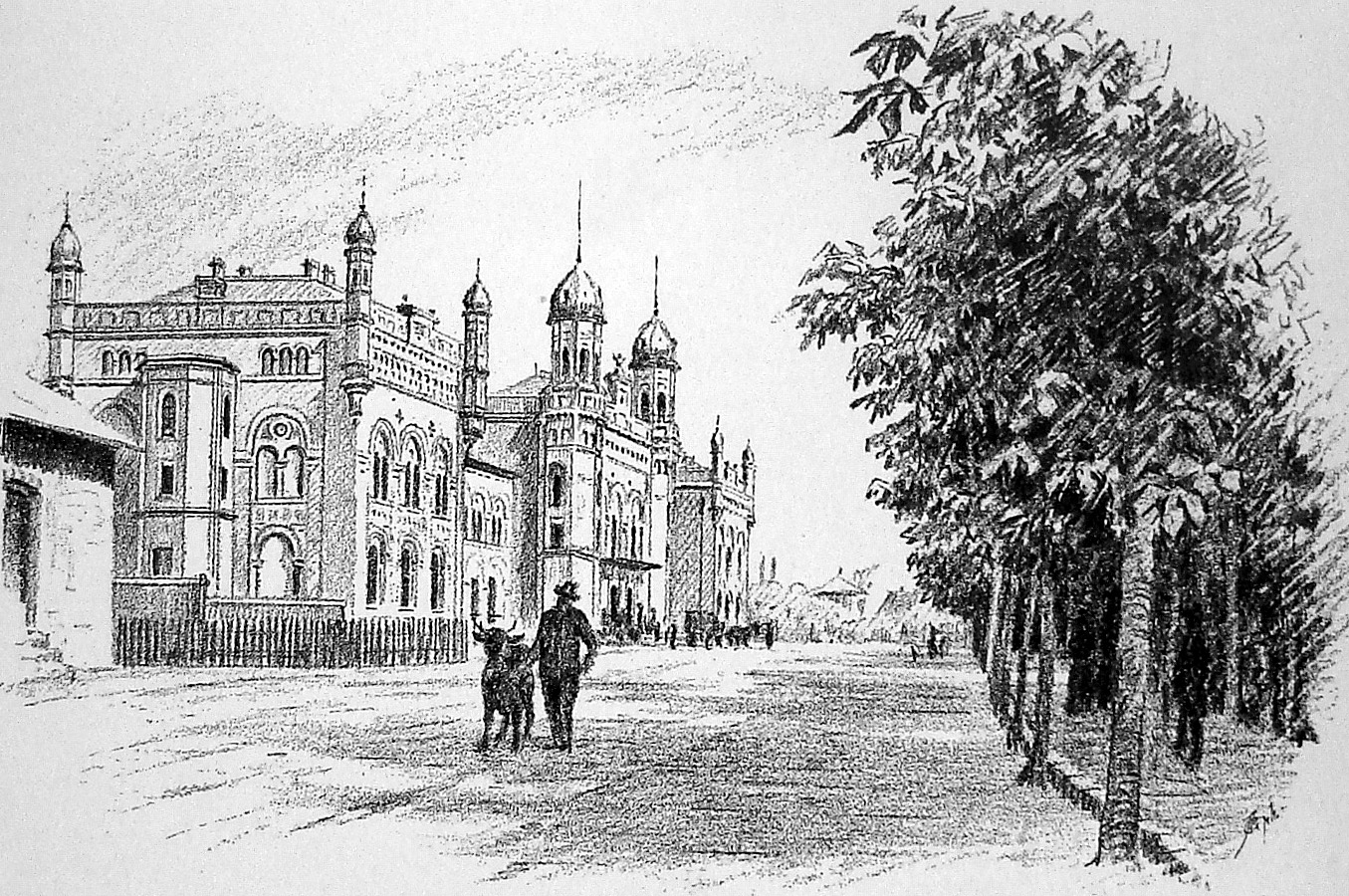
First station building (1865–1914)

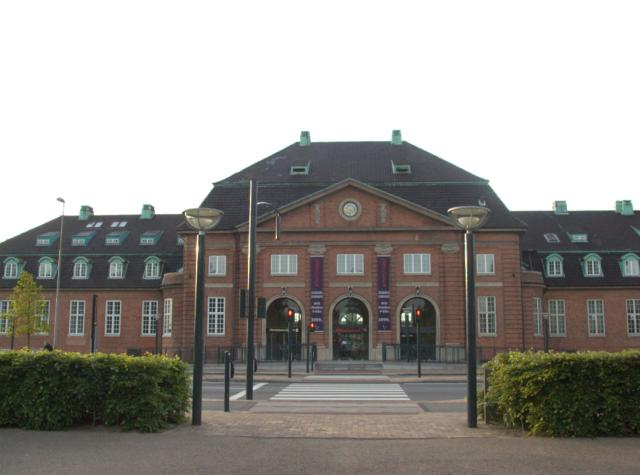
Second station building, in use 1914–1995

The current station building is Odense's third, having opened on 15 September 1995. The first one, now demolished, opened in 1865 with the rest of the railway line across Funen (Dronning Louises Jernbane). The first station building was designed by the Danish architect Niels Peder Christian Holsøe, known for the numerous station buildings he designed across Denmark in his capacity of head architect of the Danish State Railways.

The first station was replaced in 1914 by the still-existing building drawn by Heinrich Wenck.

Historically, Odense station has been the central hub of railways on Funen, being the terminus for a handful of now closed railways:

- Nordfyenske Jernbane (NFJ, 1882–1966)
- Odense–Kerteminde–Martofte Jernbane (OKMJ, 1900–1966)
- Odense–Nørre Broby–Fåborg Jernbane (ONFJ, 1906–1954)
- Nordvestfyenske Jernbane (OMB, 1911–1966)

== Services ==
The stations offers services to Copenhagen, Esbjerg, Aarhus, Svendborg and international service to Hamburg, Berlin, Dresden (Germany), and Prague (Czech Republic).

Preceding station	DSB	Following station
Copenhagen Central towards Copenhagen Airport	Copenhagen-Aalborg InterCityLyn	Fredericia towards Aalborg Airport
Copenhagen Central towards Copenhagen Airport	Copenhagen-Herning-Struer InterCityLyn	Fredericia towards Struer
Copenhagen Central towards Copenhagen Airport	Copenhagen-Sønderborg InterCityLyn	Fredericia towards Sønderborg
Langeskov towards Copenhagen Central	Copenhagen-Aalborg InterCity	Middelfart towards Aalborg Airport
Nyborg towards Østerport	Copenhagen–Esbjerg InterCity	Middelfart towards Esbjerg
Ringsted towards Copenhagen Central	Copenhagen–Odense–Hamburg EuroCity	Kolding towards Hamburg Hbf
Terminus	Odense–Fredericia Regional train	Holmstrup towards Fredericia
Preceding station	DSB Vores Tog	Following station
Terminus	Odense–Svendborg Regional train	Odense Sygehus towards Svendborg
Preceding station	SJ	Following station
Copenhagen Airport towards Stockholm C	EuroNight	Padborg towards Hamburg Hbf or Berlin Hbf
Preceding station	České dráhy	Following station
Ringsted towards Copenhagen Central	Railjet	Kolding towards Praha hl.n.

== Other ==
The Danish Railway Museum is located in the roundhouse immediately north of Odense station.

== See also ==
- List of railway stations in Denmark
