= 2025 Kolding municipal election =

Municipal election in Denmark

← 2021	18 November 2025	2029 →

All 25 seats to the Kolding municipal council 13 seats needed for a majority
- Turnout: 50,977 (68.1%) ▼1.0%
	First party	Second party	Third party
	V	A	O
Party	Venstre	Social Democrats	Danish People's Party
Last election	9 seats, 31.8%	5 seats, 17.7%	2 seats, 7.6%
Seats won	9	4	3
Seat change	0	▼1	▲1
Popular vote	15,324	7,831	6,308
Percentage	30.6%	15.6%	12.6%
Swing	▼1.2%	▼2.1%	▲5.0%
	Fourth party	Fifth party	Sixth party
	F	I	C
Party	Green Left	Liberal Alliance	Conservatives
Last election	4 seats, 17.3%	0 seats, 1.7%	3 seats, 10.5%
Seats won	3	2	1
Seat change	▼1	▲2	▼2
Popular vote	5,602	3,520	3,050
Percentage	11.2%	7.0%	6.1%
Swing	▼6.1%	▲5.4%	▼4.4%
	Seventh party	Eighth party	Ninth party
	B	Ø	Æ
Party	Social Liberals	Red-Green Alliance	Denmark Democrats
Last election	2 seats, 6.4%	0 seats, 2.9%	Did not stand
Seats won	1	1	1
Seat change	▼1	▲1	▲1
Popular vote	2,895	2,229	1,952
Percentage	5.8%	4.5%	3.9%
Swing	▼0.6%	▲1.5%	New
Mayor before election
Knud Erik Langhoff
Conservatives
Mayor after election
Jakob Ville
Venstre

The 2025 Kolding Municipal election was held on November 18, 2025, to elect the 25 members to sit in the regional council for the Kolding Municipal council, in the period of 2026 to 2029. Jakob Ville from Venstre, would win the mayoral position.

== Background ==
Following the 2021 election, Knud Erik Langhoff from the Conservatives became mayor for his first term after a dramatic night, which resulted in parties, typically considered somewhat left of the political spectrum, supporting the centre-right candidate Erik Langhoff from the Conservatives. Since then, 2 of the 3 elected Conservative council members, had left the party, one to Venstre and another to the Liberal Alliance. Following this, Langhoff announced his intention to run for re-election as a council member, but also declared that he would not seek the mayoral position for another term.

== Electoral system ==
For elections to Danish municipalities, a number varying from 9 to 31 are chosen to be elected to the municipal council. The seats are then allocated using the D'Hondt method and a closed list proportional representation. Kolding Municipality had 25 seats in 2025.

== Electoral alliances ==
=== Electoral Alliance 1 ===
Party		Political alignment
A	Social Democrats	Centre-left
B	Social Liberals	Centre to Centre-left
F	Green Left	Centre-left to Left-wing
Ø	Red-Green Alliance	Left-wing to Far-Left

=== Electoral Alliance 2 ===
Party		Political alignment
C	Conservatives	Centre-right
I	Liberal Alliance	Centre-right to Right-wing
K	Christian Democrats	Centre to Centre-right
Æ	Denmark Democrats	Right-wing to Far-right

=== Electoral Alliance 3 ===
Party		Political alignment
J	Borgernes Lokal Liste	Local politics
M	Moderates	Centre to Centre-right
O	Danish People's Party	Right-wing to Far-right
V	Venstre	Centre-right

== Results by polling station ==
Division	A	B	C	F	I	J	K	L	M	O	V	Æ	Ø
Division	%	%	%	%	%	%	%	%	%	%	%	%	%
Centrum Nord	13.0	7.6	8.0	13.4	7.8	0.2	0.1	0.3	1.3	10.9	25.1	2.7	9.5
Nordbyen	23.1	6.2	5.0	15.8	5.3	0.3	0.5	0.0	1.8	11.1	17.6	2.4	10.9
Vestbyen	22.6	4.5	6.2	14.0	4.9	0.2	0.2	0.2	1.1	13.4	22.6	3.3	6.8
Strandhuse/Nr. Bjert/ Eltang	11.6	12.0	9.8	9.0	8.0	0.2	0.1	0.1	1.5	9.0	32.6	3.5	2.5
Bramdrupdam	19.1	4.9	5.4	9.5	5.7	0.3	0.1	0.2	0.9	13.6	32.8	4.5	2.9
Alminde-Viuf/Vester Nebel	11.5	3.7	5.8	7.4	5.9	0.3	0.1	0.1	0.8	12.6	46.1	3.9	1.8
Lunderskov/Jordrup	10.0	4.9	3.8	9.2	11.7	0.9	0.3	0.2	0.8	8.7	41.8	4.8	3.0
Centrum Syd	18.2	5.9	5.0	13.0	6.4	0.4	0.5	0.3	2.2	16.5	19.4	3.0	9.2
Sydbyen	16.1	6.2	6.5	14.9	7.5	0.3	0.8	0.3	2.4	11.4	24.2	2.7	6.6
Seest	16.2	4.5	6.2	13.6	6.0	0.4	1.0	0.1	1.4	11.7	32.4	3.9	2.7
Dalby/Tved/Rebæk	11.7	5.8	7.0	9.5	7.3	0.1	0.1	0.2	4.9	9.5	39.2	2.4	2.2
S Bjert/S Stenderup/Vejstrup	15.7	6.7	6.7	17.7	6.7	0.4	0.1	0.3	0.9	11.6	24.9	4.2	4.2
Vonsild	13.7	3.2	4.5	9.3	6.8	0.5	0.5	0.1	2.0	14.2	39.5	3.6	2.2
Vamdrup/Hjarup/Ødis	22.2	2.8	4.4	6.1	8.3	3.2	0.5	0.1	0.9	9.8	33.3	6.6	1.7
Chr.Feld/Stepping/Taps/Hejls	14.1	3.5	3.9	8.0	5.3	0.8	0.7	0.2	0.8	26.7	27.3	6.3	2.5

== Opinion polls ==
Polling firm	Fieldwork date	Sample size	V	A	F	C	O	B	Ø	I	K	J	L	M	Æ	Others	Lead
Epinion	4 Sep - 13 Oct 2025	509	26.4	18.8	13.2	3.8	12.3	1.9	2.0	12.8	–	–	–	1.5	7.3	0.0	7.6
2024 european parliament election	9 Jun 2024		21.7	14.4	14.2	9.2	7.1	6.0	4.0	8.8	–	–	–	5.5	7.3	–	7.3
2022 general election	1 Nov 2022		14.9	25.7	7.4	5.4	2.9	3.2	2.7	9.4	0.7	–	–	10.2	9.5	–	10.8
2021 regional election	16 Nov 2021		41.3	20.5	8.7	7.9	5.6	5.3	3.4	1.4	1.2	–	–	–	–	–	20.8
2021 municipal election	16 Nov 2021		31.8 (9)	17.7 (5)	17.3 (4)	10.5 (3)	7.6 (2)	6.4 (2)	2.9 (0)	1.7 (0)	0.8 (0)	–	–	–	–	–	14.1
