= Ødis =

Town in Denmark

- Village
- Ødis seen from the south across Ødis Lake

- Location within Region of Southern Denmark Location within Denmark
- Coordinates: 55°24′31″N 9°22′54″E
- Country: Denmark
- Region: Southern Denmark
- Municipality: Kolding Municipality

Population (2026)
  - Total: 481

Ødis is a village in Southern Jutland, Denmark, with a population of 481 (1 January 2026), located 7 km east of Vamdrup, 12 km northwest of Christiansfeld, and 13 km southwest of Kolding. The village is part of Kolding Municipality in Region of Southern Denmark. From 1970 to 2006, Ødis was part of Vamdrup Municipality.

== Parish and church ==
Ødis is located in Ødis Parish, which historically belonged to the Duchy of Schleswig and was part of the historic South Jutland. However, it was incorporated into the Kingdom of Denmark after the Second Schleswig War in 1864 in exchange for other territories. Thus, it avoided Prussian rule and is not part of South Jutland in the modern sense. From 1970 to 2006, the parish was part of Christiansfeld Municipality in Sønderjyllands Amt.

Ødis Church

Ødis Church was built in 1857 in a Byzantine-inspired architectural style by L.A. Winstrup, based on his travels to Greece and Asia Minor. It replaced a medieval stone church, though the original tower remains, modified with a spire to suit the new style.

== Ødis Lake ==
The viewing tower by the lake and school

Southwest of the town lies Ødis Lake, which was drained in the early 1800s and restored in 2003. The lake covers 26 hectares, while the surrounding recreational area spans 40 hectares, with a parking area, paths around the eastern side, a viewing tower by the school, and a shelter area. Over 200 bird species have been recorded around the lake.

== Facilities ==
Ødis School

- Ødis School is located slightly southwest of the village, with 97 students from kindergarten through sixth grade and 13 teachers.
- Ødis Hall and a sports field are adjacent to the school.
- Ødis Sports Association offers handball, football, badminton, and children’s gymnastics.

Ødis Village Hall

- Ødis Village Hall, dating back to 1903, has a meeting room on the first floor and a banquet hall, renovated in 2013, with a capacity for 85 guests.
- Ødis Nursery, established in 1971, is now a branch of Børnehuset Søbo in Christiansfeld, with a capacity of 60 children ages 0-6.
- Vesterled Care Center, expanded in 2006, has 25 rooms: 18 single rooms, three rooms for couples, and four temporary rooms.

== History ==
Archaeological finds from the Neolithic have been found south of Ødis Lake, and a Bronze Age refuse layer was discovered north of the lake. Two burial mounds in Drenderup Forest are believed to date from around the time of Christ, and remains of a 600-700-year-old water mill were discovered west of Ødis Lake.

=== The Railway Town ===
In 1904, Ødis was described as follows: "Ødis with Church, Parsonage, School and Primary School, Mission House (built 1893), Savings Bank (founded 1880...232 accounts), Mill and Inn". The 19th-century map shows a brickworks, and the 20th-century map shows a bakery and two blacksmith shops.

The former station building in Ødis

Ødis had a railway station on the Kolding Sydbaner line from Kolding to Vamdrup (1911–1948). The station had a 100-meter siding and an animal pen. The station building still exists at Stationsvej 15.

With the railway, the town gained a midwife, shop, knitwear store, saddler, cooperative, dairy, mill, and a telephone exchange serving 49 subscribers (the same number in 1924 and 1942).

=== Reunion Stone ===
The Reunion Stone in Ødis

A stone on the Church Square originally commemorated the loss of Schleswig in 1864 and was later updated to commemorate the Reunion of 1920.

== Notable people ==
- Johannes C. Bjerg (1886–1955), sculptor, professor, and director of the Royal Danish Academy of Fine Arts
- Erik Hoppe (born in Ødis 1896, died in Kvam, Norway 1968), Danish painter
