= Christiansfeld Pharmacy =

Coordinates: 55°21′20″N 9°28′58″E

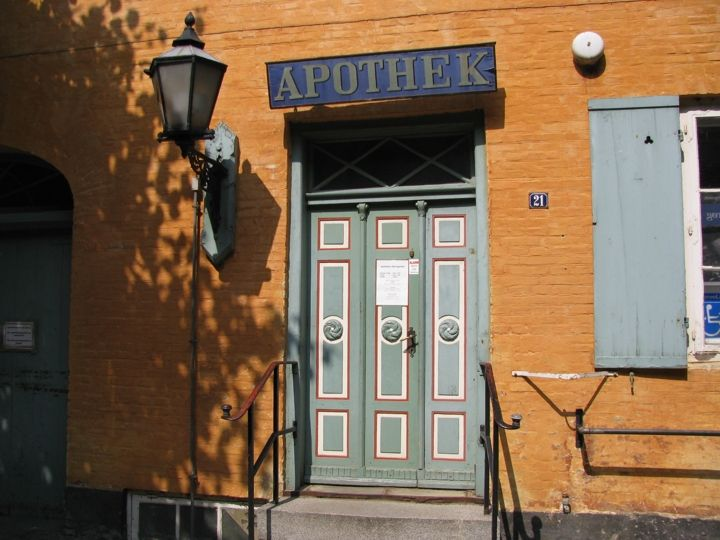
Christiansfeld Apotek (Pharmacy)

Christiansfeld Pharmacy (Danish: Christiansfeld Apotek) was established in 1785 in Christiansfeld, Denmark. Its building at Lindegade 21 was in 1945 listed in the Danish registry of protected buildings and places.

== History ==
The pharmacy was established in 1785 and was until 1835 owned by Brødremenigheden.

== Building ==
The building is from 1783 but the dormer was added in circa 1940. The pharmacy was in 1946 acquired by Karen Johanne Rømer (born 1894).

== List of owners ==
List of owners:

- xx.xx.1785 - xx.xx.1793 Jacob Heinrich Krohn
- xx.xx.1793 - 31.12.1837 Abraham Gottlieb Padel
- 01.01.1838 - 31.12.1868 Abraham Friederich Padel
- 01.01.1869 - 31.12.1909 Carl Theodor Abraham Padel
- 01.01.1910 - 31.05.1921 Wilfred Theodor Padel
- 01.06.1921 - 10.12.1937 Hans Amatus Theodor Christian Lind
- Indehavere:
- 29.11.1937 - 30.04.1946 Hans Amatus Theodor Christian Lind
- 04.01.1946 - 15.10.1954 Karen Johanne Rømer

Ø 15.09.1954 - 31.01.1973 Sigrid Johanne Hald

- 25.10.1972 - 31.01.1987 Finn Ohlsen
- 07.01.1987 - Ingrid Frees Christensen

== Exyrtnal links ==
- Official website
