= Lissner =

Lissner may refer to:

== People ==
- Caren Lissner (born 1973), novelist and essayist
- Ernst Lissner (1874–1941), Russian painter
- Holger Lissner (born 1938), priest
- Ignatius Lissner (1867–1948), priest
- Isidor Lissner (1832–1902), politician
- Ivar Lissner (1909–1967), journalist and spy
- Ray Lissner (1903–1944), American filmmaker

== Places ==
- Lissner, Queensland, former suburb in Charters Towers, Australia
  - Boer War Veterans Memorial Kiosk and Lissner Park, heritage site in that suburb
