= Lunderskov Municipality =

Former municipality in Vejle, Denmark

Coordinates: 55.4794°N 9.29972°E

Until 1 January 2007 Lunderskov Municipality was a municipality (Danish, kommune) in Vejle County near the east coast of the Jutland peninsula in southeast Denmark. The municipality covered an area of 96 km^{2}, and had a total population of 5,478 (2005). Its last mayor was Hans Peter Andersen, a member of the Venstre (Liberal Party) political party. The main town and the site of its municipal council was the town of Lunderskov, located ca. halfway between the cities of Kolding and Vejen, just south of the Esbjerg Motorway.

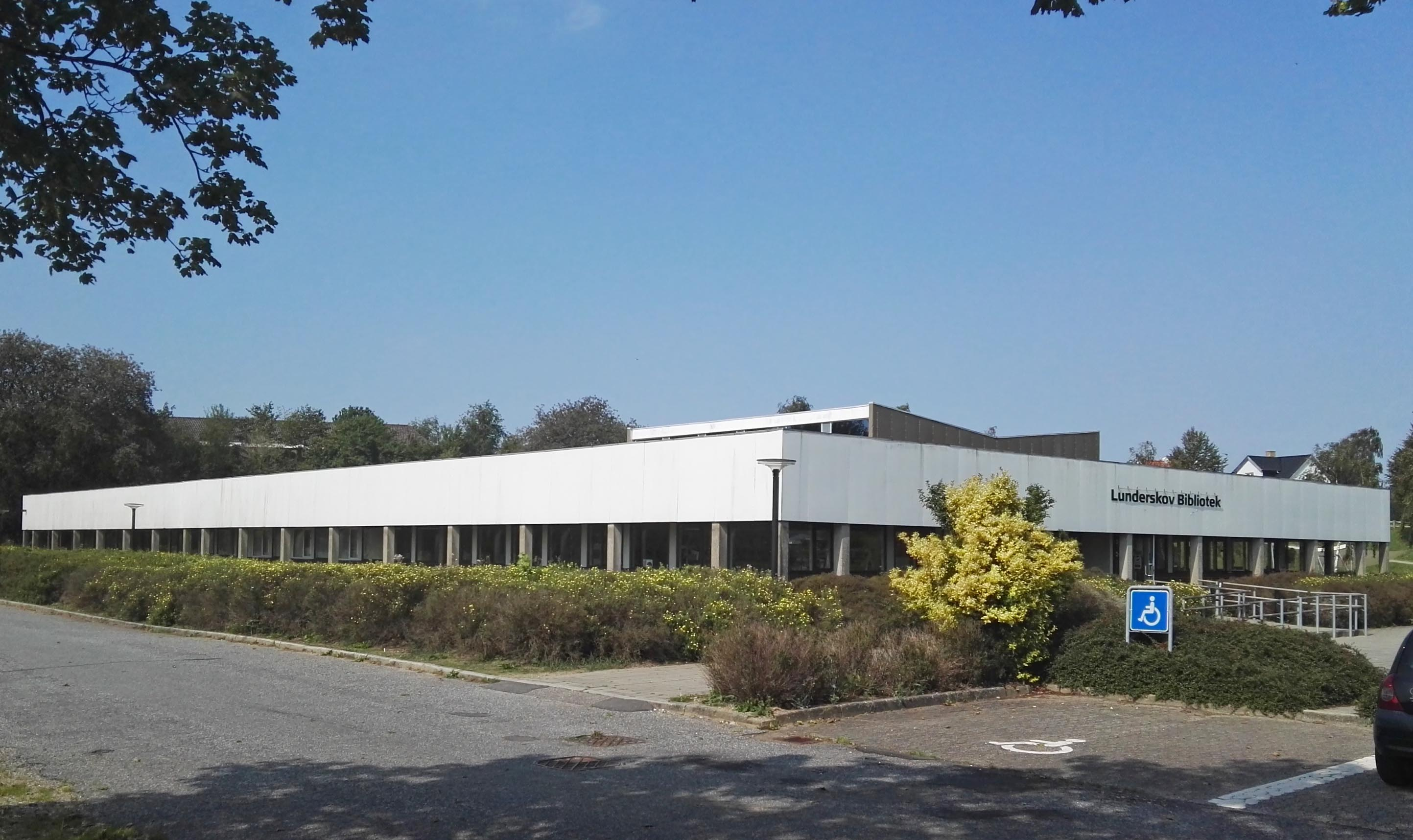
The former townhall of Lunderskov Municipality, now public library

The municipality was created in 1970 as the result of a kommunalreform ("Municipality Reform") that merged a number of existing parishes:

- Jordrup Parish
- Lejrskov Parish
- Skanderup Parish

Lunderskov municipality ceased to exist as the result of Kommunalreformen ("The Municipality Reform" of 2007). It was merged with Christiansfeld, Kolding, and Vamdrup municipalities to form a new Kolding municipality. This created a municipality with an area of 640 km^{2} and a total population of 86,102 (2005). The new municipality belongs to Region of Southern Denmark.

== Notable people ==
- Paula Trock (1889–1979 in Lunderskov) a Danish weaver
