= 2021 Kolding municipal election =

- 16 November 2021

All 25 seats to the Kolding Municipal Council 13 seats needed for a majority
- Turnout: 50,617 (69.1%) ▼2.8pp
| | First party | Second party | Third party |
|---|---|---|---|
| | V | A | F |
| Party | Venstre | Social Democrats | Green Left |
| Last election | 13 seats, 46.4% | 5 seats, 19.5% | 2 seats, 7.1% |
| Seats won | 9 | 5 | 4 |
| Seat change | ▼4 | 0 | ▲2 |
| Popular vote | 15,825 | 8,818 | 8,613 |
| Percentage | 31.8% | 17.7% | 17.3% |
| Swing | ▼14.6% | ▼1.8% | ▲10.2% |
| | Fourth party | Fifth party | Sixth party |
| | C | O | B |
| Party | Conservatives | Danish People's Party | Social Liberals |
| Last election | 0 seats, 3.3% | 3 seats, 11.1% | 1 seat, 4.5% |
| Seats won | 3 | 2 | 2 |
| Seat change | ▲3 | ▼1 | ▲1 |
| Popular vote | 5,243 | 3,799 | 3,185 |
| Percentage | 10.5% | 7.6% | 6.4% |
| Swing | ▲7.2% | ▼3.5% | ▲1.9% |
| | Seventh party |
| | Ø |
| Party | Red–Green Alliance |
| Last election | 1 seat, 3.1% |
| Seats won | 0 |
| Seat change | ▼1 |
| Popular vote | 1,460 |
| Percentage | 2.9% |
| Swing | ▼0.2% |
Mayor before election
Jørn Pedersen
Venstre
Mayor after election
Knud Erik Langhoff
Conservatives

Since the 2007 municipal reform, Venstre had won the mayor position following all three elections in Kolding Municipality. In the 2017 Kolding municipal election, they would win 13 of the 25 seats, which equalled an absolute majority. Jørn Pedersen, who was mayor from 2010 to 2021, would announce his intention not to stand for a fourth term prior to the election. Instead, in October 2020, it would be confirmed that Eva Kjer Hansen would be the mayor candidate, Venstre would put forward for this election.

On the opposite side of the political spectrum, former Minister of Foreign Affairs Villy Søvndal, would be the top candidate for the Green Left. . Villy Søvndal had led the Green Left to their best result in the party's history in 2007. Apart from that, he had led the Green Left to 6 seats in the 2017 Southern Denmark regional council election, an increase of 4 seats compared to their result in 2013. Therefore, it was speculated that he could challenge Venstre for the mayor position.

Despite Venstre losing 4 seats, they became the biggest party and a majority between the traditional blue bloc indicated that Eva Kjer Hansen would become the new mayor. However, in a dramatic turnaround, outsider Knud Erik Langhoff from the Conservatives would end up having a majority supporting him. Untradtionally, three red bloc parties, Social Democrats, the Social Liberals and Green Left would support centre-right Conservatives taking the mayor position.

This would mark the first time since the 2007 municipal reform, that a municipality in the South Jutland constituency would have a mayor from the Conservatives. It was one of three municipalities in the constituency where the Conservatives had mayor's elected in the 2021, and it was seen as a big success for the Conservatives, who had have trouble winning mayor positions outside Greater Copenhagen and North Zealand in recent elections.

== Electoral system ==
For elections to Danish municipalities, a number varying from 9 to 31 are chosen to be elected to the municipal council. The seats are then allocated using the D'Hondt method and a closed list proportional representation. Kolding Municipality had 25 seats in 2021

Unlike in Danish General Elections, in elections to municipal councils, electoral alliances are allowed.

== Electoral alliances ==
=== Electoral Alliance 1 ===
| Party | | Political alignment |
|---|---|---|
| A | Social Democrats | Centre-left |
| F | Green Left | Centre-left to Left-wing |

=== Electoral Alliance 2 ===
| Party | | Political alignment |
|---|---|---|
| C | Conservatives | Centre-right |
| D | New Right | Right-wing to Far-right |
| K | Christian Democrats | Centre to Centre-right |

=== Electoral Alliance 3 ===
| Party | | Political alignment |
|---|---|---|
| I | Liberal Alliance | Centre-right to Right-wing |
| O | Danish People's Party | Right-wing to Far-right |
| V | Venstre | Centre-right |

=== Electoral Alliance 4 ===
| Party | | Political alignment |
|---|---|---|
| B | Social Liberals | Centre to Centre-left |
| Y | Kryds for Kolding | Local politics |
| Ø | Red–Green Alliance | Left-wing to Far-Left |

== Results by polling station ==
Y = Kryds for Kolding

| Division | A | B | C | D | F | I | K | O | V | Y | Ø |
| Division | % | % | % | % | % | % | % | % | % | % | % |
|---|---|---|---|---|---|---|---|---|---|---|---|
| Centrum Nord | 16.8 | 8.4 | 11.6 | 2.9 | 20.2 | 2.1 | 0.3 | 5.4 | 25.8 | 0.6 | 5.9 |
| Nordbyen | 24.4 | 7.6 | 5.8 | 2.3 | 27.7 | 1.4 | 0.3 | 6.3 | 18.4 | 0.8 | 5.0 |
| Vestbyen | 24.8 | 7.8 | 7.6 | 2.3 | 21.2 | 1.3 | 0.7 | 8.2 | 21.4 | 0.6 | 4.1 |
| Strandhuse/Nr. Bjert/ Eltang | 13.0 | 7.2 | 16.2 | 2.5 | 14.1 | 1.6 | 0.4 | 5.0 | 38.0 | 0.4 | 1.7 |
| Bramdrupdam | 17.2 | 6.8 | 10.0 | 3.2 | 18.0 | 1.5 | 0.2 | 6.0 | 35.3 | 0.2 | 1.6 |
| Alminde-Viuf/Vester Nebel | 13.7 | 3.8 | 5.9 | 2.5 | 11.0 | 1.0 | 0.3 | 6.3 | 53.7 | 0.1 | 1.6 |
| Lunderskov/Jordrup | 14.2 | 6.8 | 8.3 | 3.3 | 14.5 | 1.0 | 0.6 | 5.3 | 44.0 | 0.3 | 1.7 |
| Centrum Syd | 21.4 | 7.1 | 7.2 | 3.0 | 21.2 | 2.1 | 1.1 | 11.2 | 19.9 | 0.9 | 5.0 |
| Sydbyen | 17.1 | 8.3 | 10.8 | 2.6 | 20.7 | 2.4 | 1.2 | 7.0 | 24.5 | 0.4 | 5.1 |
| Seest | 19.4 | 5.1 | 10.2 | 2.3 | 17.6 | 1.5 | 2.9 | 8.0 | 30.3 | 0.4 | 2.4 |
| Dalby/Tved/Rebæk | 14.5 | 5.3 | 12.9 | 2.2 | 15.6 | 1.8 | 0.5 | 5.6 | 39.6 | 0.4 | 1.5 |
| S Bjert/S Stenderup/Vejstrup | 13.1 | 9.0 | 12.8 | 2.9 | 23.5 | 1.7 | 0.1 | 6.1 | 26.8 | 0.3 | 3.9 |
| Vonsild | 23.0 | 4.2 | 8.8 | 3.2 | 15.6 | 3.3 | 1.1 | 7.3 | 31.9 | 0.2 | 1.4 |
| Vamdrup/Hjarup/Ødis | 24.4 | 3.8 | 14.4 | 3.8 | 10.9 | 1.2 | 0.7 | 6.4 | 33.2 | 0.1 | 1.2 |
| Chr.Feld/Stepping/Taps/Hejls | 14.3 | 4.0 | 8.8 | 4.7 | 12.6 | 1.4 | 1.2 | 20.0 | 31.4 | 0.1 | 1.7 |

== Results ==
| Party | | Votes | % | +/- | Seats | +/- |
Kolding Municipality
| V | Venstre | 15,825 | 31.78 | -14.66 | 9 | -4 |
| A | Social Democrats | 8,818 | 17.71 | -1.77 | 5 | 0 |
| F | Green Left | 8,613 | 17.30 | +10.19 | 4 | +2 |
| C | Conservatives | 5,243 | 10.53 | +7.26 | 3 | +3 |
| O | Danish People's Party | 3,799 | 7.63 | -3.49 | 2 | -1 |
| B | Social Liberals | 3,185 | 6.40 | +1.91 | 2 | +1 |
| Ø | Red-Green Alliance | 1,460 | 2.93 | -0.14 | 0 | -1 |
| D | New Right | 1,450 | 2.91 | +1.95 | 0 | 0 |
| I | Liberal Alliance | 824 | 1.65 | -0.31 | 0 | 0 |
| K | Christian Democrats | 395 | 0.79 | +0.17 | 0 | 0 |
| Y | Kryds for Kolding | 183 | 0.37 | New | 0 | New |
| Total | | 49,795 | 100 | N/A | 25 | N/A |
| Invalid votes | | 194 | 0.26 | +0.12 | | |
| Blank votes | | 628 | 0.86 | +0.18 | | |
| Turnout | | 50,617 | 69.09 | -2.78 | | |
Source: valg.dk
