= Vamdrup Municipality =

Former municipality of Denmark

Coordinates: 55.4253°N 9.2825°E

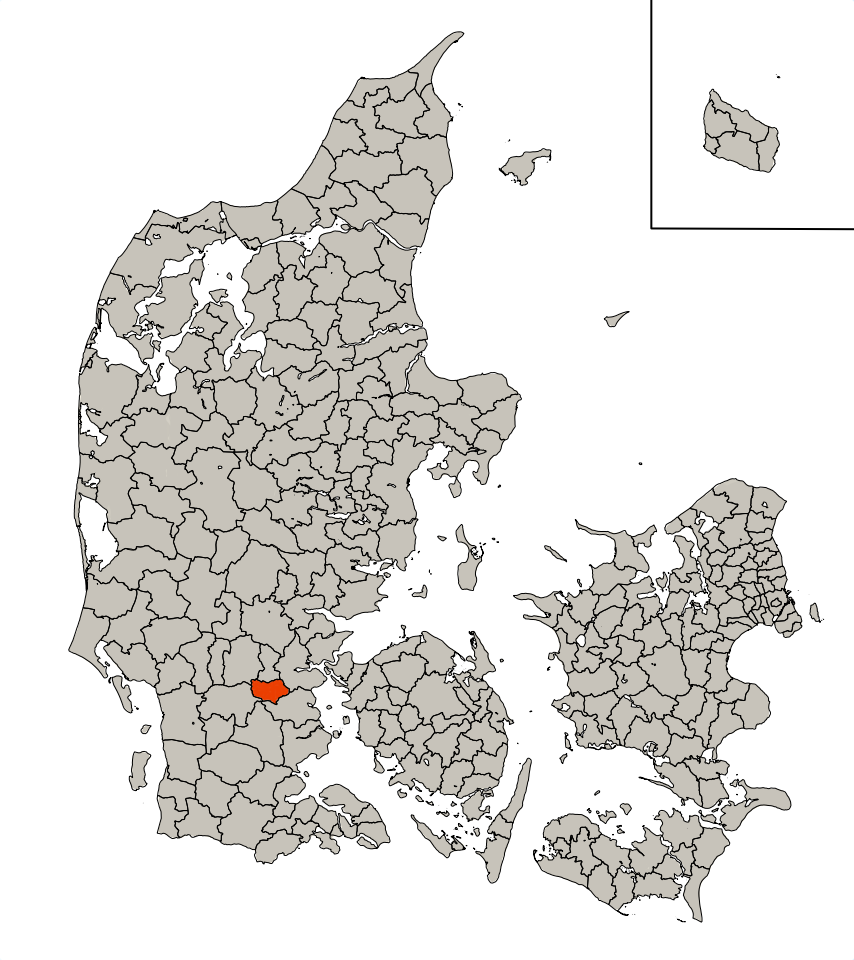
Vamdrup Municipality's location in Denmark, 1970–2006.

Vamdrup municipality was a Danish municipality (Danish, kommune) in the former Vejle County on the Jutland peninsula which existed from 1970 until 1 January 2007.

== History ==
The municipality was created in 1970 as the result of the 1970 Municipal reforms that merged the existing parishes of Hjarup, Vamdrup, and Ødis Parish. The main city and the site of its municipal council was the town of Vamdrup. By 2005, the municipality covered an area of 102 km^{2}, and had a total population of 7,456. Its last mayor was Mike Legarth, a member of the Conservative People's Party.

Vamdrup municipality ceased to exist as the result of The Municipality Reform of 2007). It was merged with Christiansfeld, Kolding, and Lunderskov municipalities to form a new Kolding municipality. This created a municipality with an area of 640 km^{2} and an initial population of 86,102 (2005). The new municipality belongs to Region of Southern Denmark. There is a small airport called Vamdrup Kolding Airport, were Danish Air Transport is based.
