= Carl Fredrik Kiörboe =

Danish-born Swedish artist

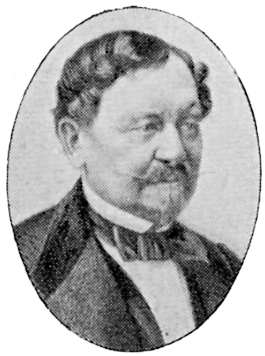
Carl Fredrik Kiörboe, from the Svenskt Porträttgalleri XX

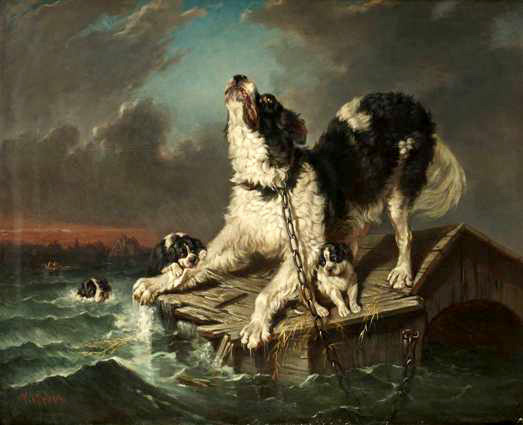
The Flood (1850)

Carl Fredrik Kiörboe (1 June 1799, Christiansfeld – 2 January 1876, Dijon) was a Danish-born Swedish artist who specialized in paintings with animals; primarily dogs and horses. He was apparently self-taught.

== Biography ==
He was born in what was then the Duchy of Schleswig. He spent time in the Netherlands and Hamburg before settling in Stockholm. It is not known with whom (or if) he took art lessons. However, after studying animal anatomy with an uncle named Norling, who was a veterinary surgeon, he enlisted in the Jämtlands hästjägare (cavalry regiment) in 1829.

He began by painting small pictures of horses in pastel, but soon switched to oils and the occasional lithograph. His works were executed while on assignment as well as at his home base. He was eventually promoted to Lieutenant and, in 1837, was officially granted the title of ryttmästare. After leaving the service, he spent some time in Berlin then, in 1840, went to Paris, where he decided to stay, although he remained a Swedish citizen.

He soon became famous for his animal paintings and was commissioned to do equestrian portraits of King Karl XIV Johan, then-Prince Karl XV and Napoleon III. He also exhibited at the Salon of 1844 and 1846. His most often reproduced painting is Översvämningen (The Flood), which depicts a dog, clinging to wreckage, while her puppies swim there to safety. Later, he was named a member of the Royal Swedish Academy of Arts and court painter.

During the Paris Commune, his home in Saint-Cloud was destroyed. He then moved to Dijon to live with his step-daughter.

Kiörboe's works are represented at the Gothenburg Museum of Art, Nationalmuseum and Skokloster Castle.
