= Vamdrup =

- town
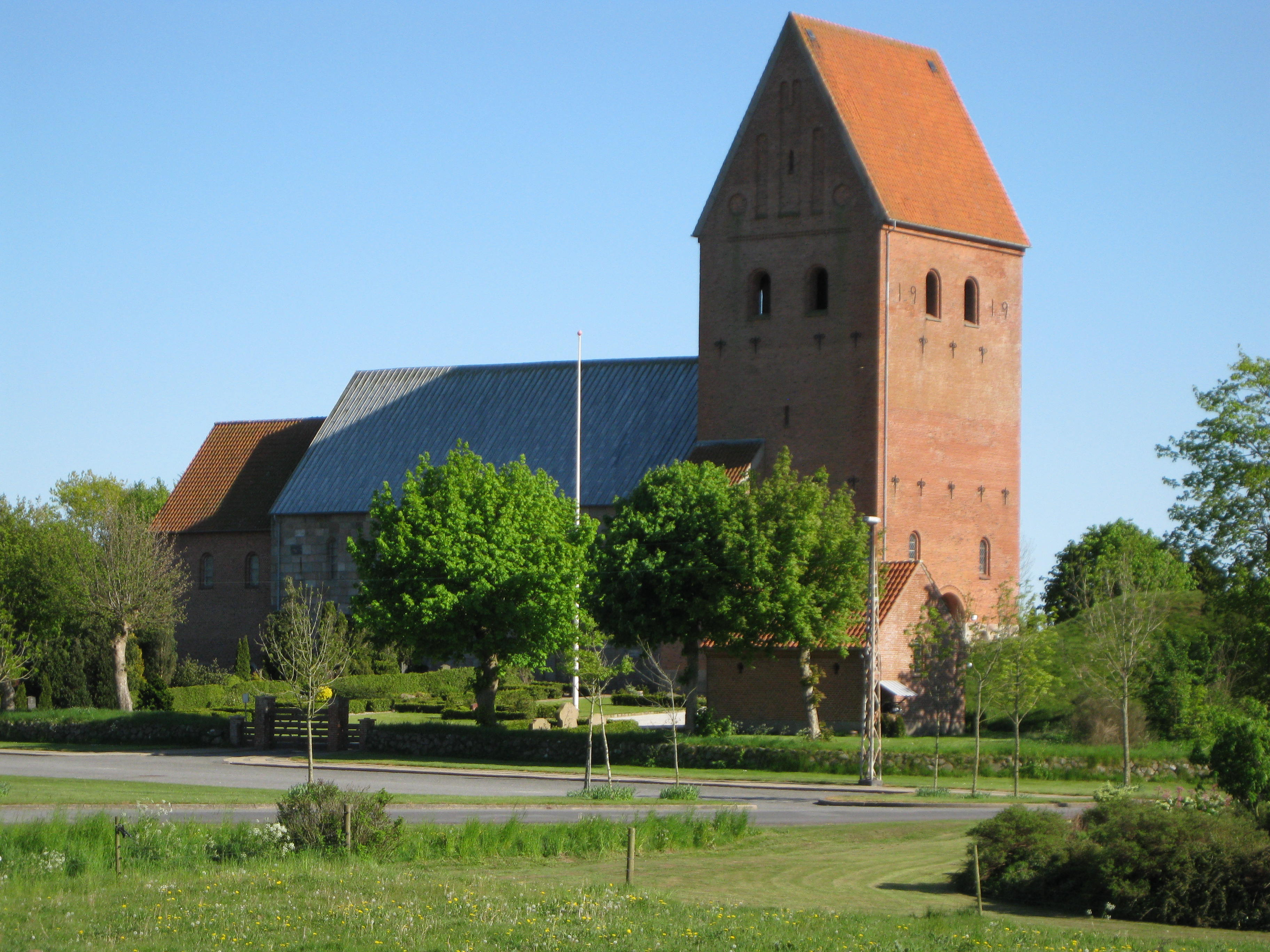
- Vamdrup church

- Location in Denmark Vamdrup (Region of Southern Denmark)
- Coordinates: 55.42999°N 9.28740°E
- Country: Denmark
- Region: Southern Denmark (Syddanmark)
- Municipality: Kolding

Area
  - Urban: 4.6 km^{2} (1.8 sq mi)

Population (2026)
  - Urban: 4,943
  - Urban density: 1,100/km^{2} (2,800/sq mi)
  - Gender: 2,477 males and 2,466 females
- Time zone: UTC+1 (CET)
  - Summer (DST): UTC+2 (CEST)
- Postal code: DK-6580 Vamdrup

Vamdrup is a railway town in the Region of Southern Denmark, near Kolding in Denmark with a population of 4,943 (1 January 2026).

Vamdrup is served by Vamdrup station on the Fredericia–Padborg railway line.

== History ==
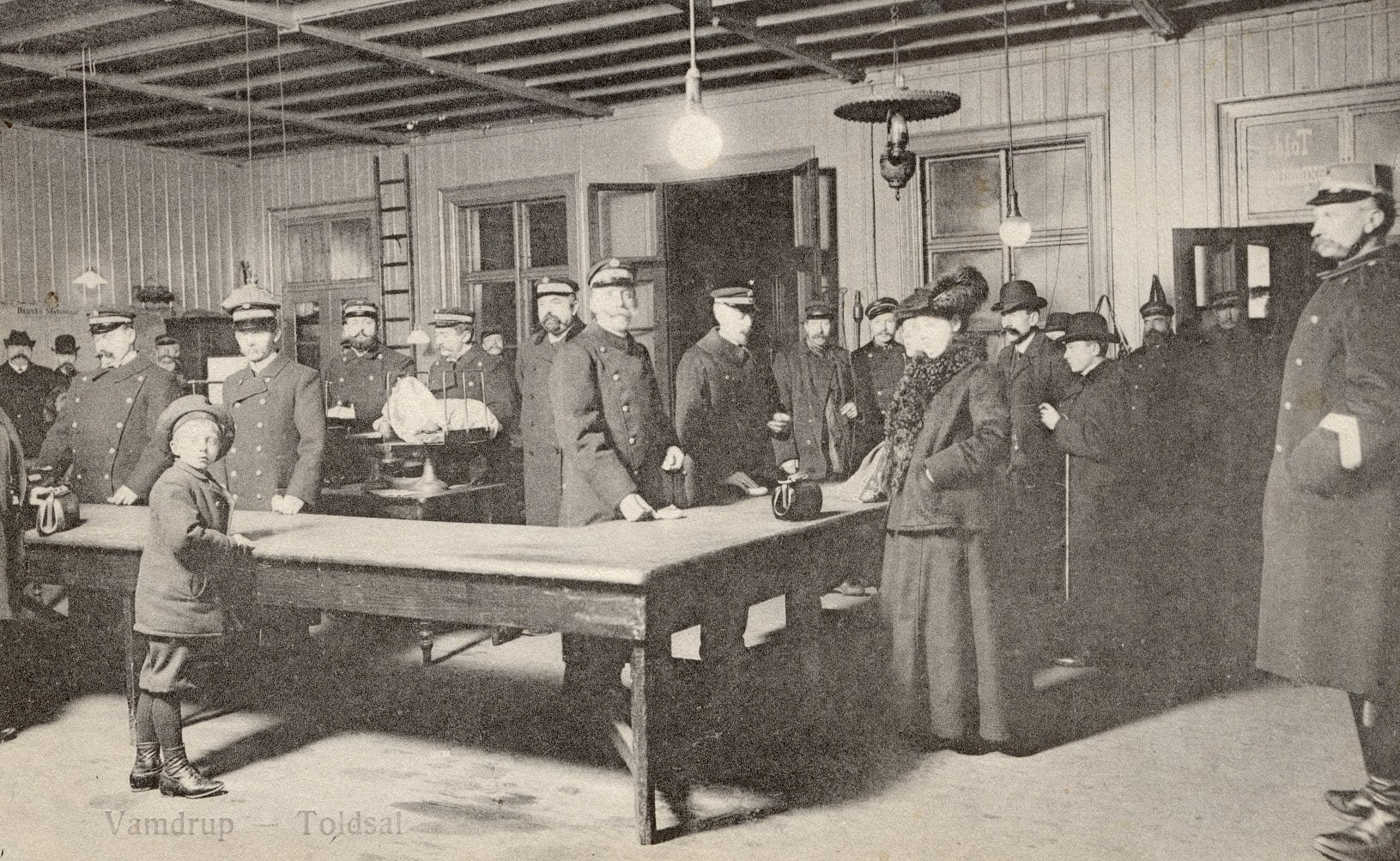
The custom hall in the old station building when the railway station was a border railway station

Three oak coffins were uncovered from graves in the Bronze Age mound Guldhøj in Holt near Vamdrup in 1891, and are now on display at the National Museum (Nationalmuseet).

After the Second War of Schleswig in 1864, where Denmark lost Southern Jutland to Germany until 1920, Vamdrup became a border town, where the railway station had important function as a border railway station. Kolding Sydbaner, a railway company that existed from 1911 to 1948, also had a railway line to Vamdrup.

In connection with the industrialisation in the 1950s and 1960s Vamdrup flourished again with many new companies.

Vamdrup was the municipal seat of the former Vamdrup Municipality, until 1 January 2007.

== Economy ==
Danish Air Transport has its head office in the town.

== Notable people ==
- Johannes Bjerg (1886 in Ødis near Kolding – 1955), Danish sculptor; worked in the El Greco-style
- Lasse Boesen (born 1979 in Vamdrup), retired Danish team handball player
