= George Frederic Bahnson =

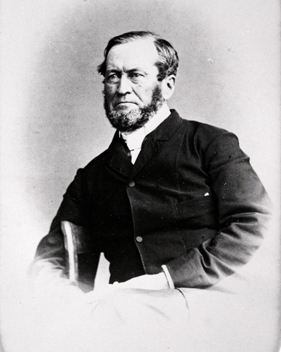
- Born: September 16, 1805; Christiansfeld
- Died: September 11, 1869 (aged 63); Salem

George Frederic Bahnson (September 16, 1805 – September 11, 1869) was a Danish-born bishop of the Moravian Church in America.

== Biography ==
George Frederic Bahnson was born on September 16, 1805 in Christiansfeld, Denmark.

He was educated at the Moravian college and the theological seminary in Germany, and in 1829 emigrated to the United States and entered the boarding-school at Nazareth, Pennsylvania, as a tutor. Five years later he began his ministerial career. The two churches in which he labored longest and with most success were those at Lancaster, Pennsylvania, and Salem, North Carolina He was consecrated to the episcopacy at Bethlehem, 13 May 1860, and presided over the southern district. In 1869 he went to Europe to attend the general synod of the Moravian church, and in the course of the journey his health failed, and he died a few weeks after his return on 11 September 1869 in Salem.
