= Listed buildings in Kolding Municipality =

This is a list of listed buildings in Kolding Municipality, Denmark.

== The list ==
Listing name	Image	Location	Year built	Contributing resource	Ref
Apoteket, Christiansfeld		Lindegade 21, 6070 Christiansfeld	1724	Chemist's from 1783 with rounded dormr added in c. 1840	Ref4
Arndt's House		Lindegade 20, 6070 Christiansfeld	1784	Town house from 1784 designed by Johan Gottfried Arndt	Ref
Christina Frederica Stiftelsen		Gl. Kongevej 11, 6070 Christiansfeld	1724	Building from 1824, probably designed by W.F. Meyer	Ref
Christinero		Hjerndrupvej 0, 6070 Christiansfeld	1724	Grove with its paths, springs, lakes, fountains, kitchen house, cottage, tomb and monument to Christina Friderica v. Holstein	Ref
Drengeskolen		Lindegade 13, 6070 Christiansfeld	1724	Town house from 1788, extended with two bays to the east in 1796 and two bays to the west in 1862	Ref
Helligkorsgade 18		Helligkorsgade 18, 6000 Kolding	1589	Half-timbered town house from 1589	Ref
Helligkorsgade 20		Helligkorsgade 18, 6000 Kolding	c. 1632	altered from 1632, rebuilt in the 19th century	Ref
