= Sønder Bjert =

- Town
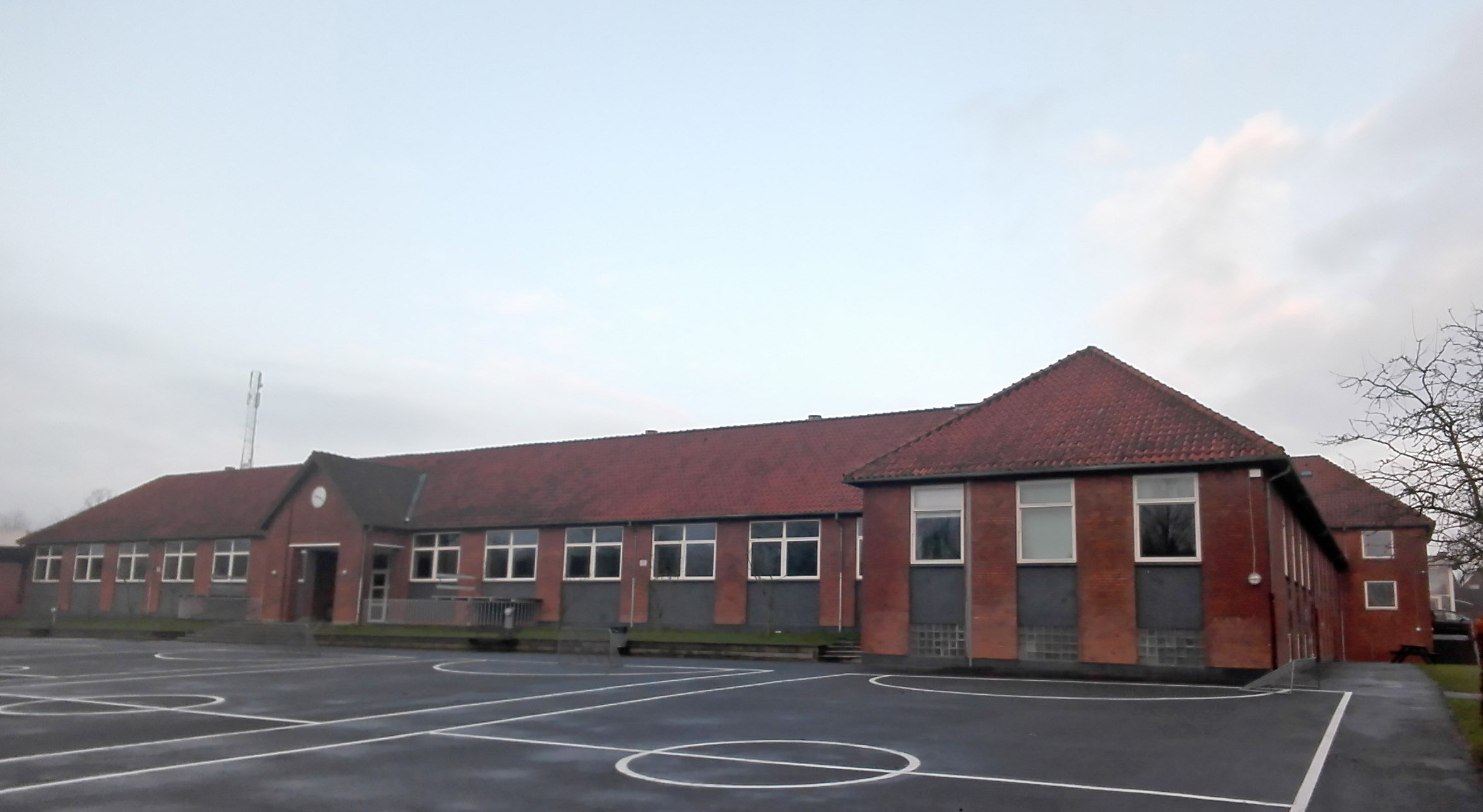
- Sønder Bjert school

- Sønder Bjert (left center) in Denmark Sønder Bjert (Region of Southern Denmark)
- Coordinates: 55°27′0″N 9°33′0″E
- Country: Denmark
- Region: Southern Denmark (Syddanmark)
- Municipality: Kolding

Area
  - Urban: 1.4 km^{2} (0.54 sq mi)

Population (2026)
  - Urban: 2,324
  - Urban density: 1,700/km^{2} (4,300/sq mi)
- Time zone: UTC+1 (CET)
  - Summer (DST): UTC+2 (CEST)
- Postal code: DK-6091 Bjert
- Website: www.sdr-bjert.dk (in Danish)

Sønder Bjert is a Danish town in the Region of Southern Denmark with a population of 2,324 (1 January 2026). It is located approximately 7 km southeast of Kolding and is a part of Kolding Municipality.

== Overview ==
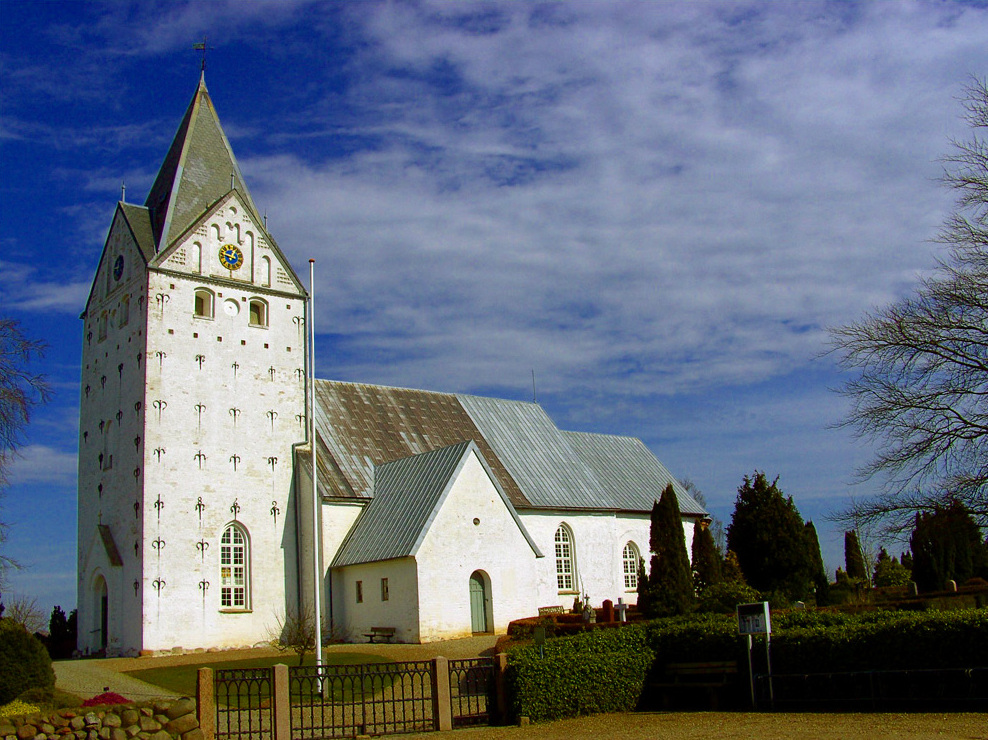
Sønder Bjert Church

Sønder Bjert Kirke (Sønder Bjert Church) was built near the end of the 12th century out of stone cut from boulders and originally did not have a tower. The church's roofing consists of lead, which was last renovated in 2000.

Sønder Bjert's first inn (Sønder Bjert Kro) was established back in 1759, but the building it currently occupies was built in 1855. In 2002 the inn was renovated to include new meeting and conference facilities.

A local dairy cooperative started production of milk on July 5, 1887, but later closed on November 20, 1958. After short stints as a school furniture workshop and paper processing center, the dairy's former building was refurbished to serve as a cultural and recreation center. In addition, it has an internet cafe which offers introductory computer courses to the retired and elderly.

== Famous residents ==
- A. J. Iversen (1888 in Sønder Bjert - 1979) a Danish cabinetmaker and furniture designer
- Holger Lissner (born 1938) a Danish priest and hymn writer, worked in Sønder Bjert 1980–2003
- Villy Søvndal (born 1952) politician, former leader of the Danish Socialist People's Party 2005 to 2012, lives in Sønder Bjert
