= Holger Lissner =

Danish hymnwriter (born 1938)

Holger Lissner (born 15 July 1938 in Rynkeby), is a Danish pastor and hymn writer.

== Biography ==
Lissner was a teacher at Løgumkloster Højskole from 1971 to 1979 and a pastor in Sønder Bjert from 1980 to 2003, before retiring in 2003.

He worked a lot with hymns, both as a hymn writer, and as editor of collections of new hymns and choral works. He also wrote the liturgies for church services, including "Spillemandsmessen", a service with music for Danish folk musicians.

In Denmark, Lissner is known for writing a Christian version of the Lucia song in 1982.

In Norway, he is known for the advent hymn "Nå tenner vi vår adventskrans", which is in the 1985 edition of The Norsk Salmebok.

== Works ==
Holger Lisner has published:

- Løgumklostesangbogen (Salmer og sange til vor tid), 1974 (editor)
- Det levende vand (choral work), 1990
- Gudstjeneste for alle sanser, 1995
- Du fylder mig med glæde (hymns) 1998
- Jonas (musical) 1996
- Livets træ, 1998

== Hymns ==
Holger Lisner is represented by the following original hymns in the 2003 edition of Den Danske Salmebog:

- 371: Du fylder mig med glæde
- 414: Den mægtige finder vi ikke
- 660: Kom, hjælp mig, Herre Jesus
- 678: Guds fred er glæden i dit sind
- 698: Kain, hvor er din bror?
- 786: Nu går solen sin vej
