= Vester Nebel =

- Town
- Location within Denmark Location within Region of Southern Denmark
- Coordinates: 55°33′46″N 9°24′28″E
- Country: Denmark
- Region: Southern Denmark
- Municipality: Kolding Municipality

Area
  - Urban: 1.2 km^{2} (0.46 sq mi)

Population (2026)
  - Urban: 1,984
  - Urban density: 1,700/km^{2} (4,300/sq mi)
- Time zone: UTC+1 (CET)
  - Summer (DST): UTC+2 (CEST)
- Postal code: DK-6040 Egtved

Vester Nebel is a town in Kolding Municipality, Region of Southern Denmark in Denmark with a population of 1,984 (1 January 2026). It is located 8 km northwest of Kolding and 9 km southeast of Egtved.

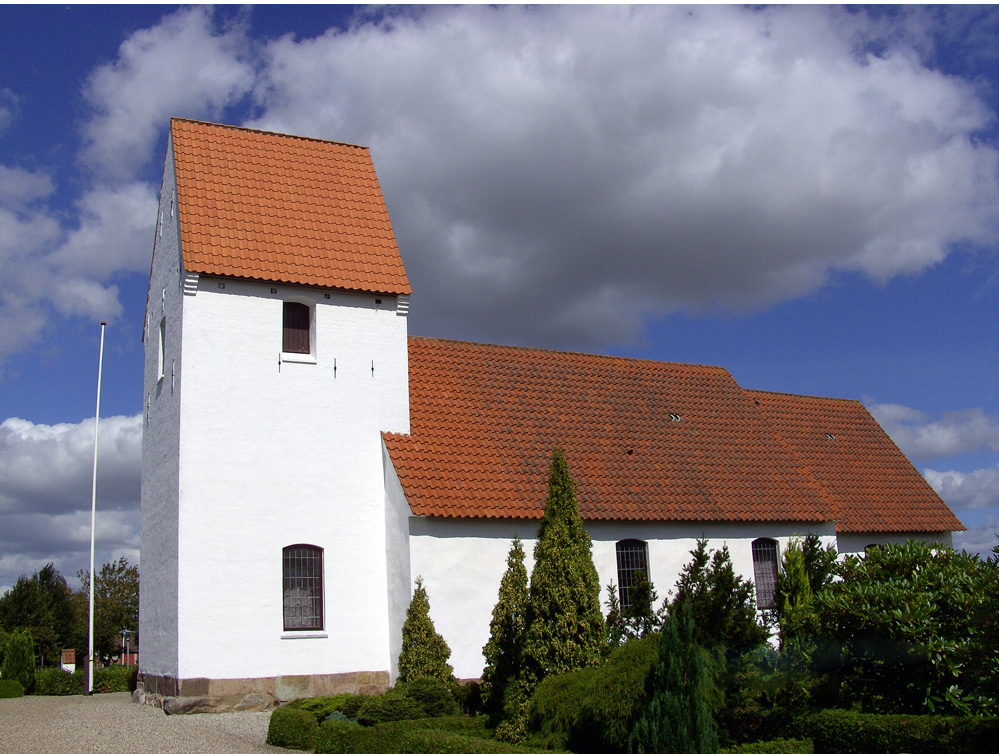
Vester Nebel Church

Vester Nebel Church is located in the town.
