= Kolding Municipality =

Kolding Municipality Kolding Kommune (Danish)
- Municipality
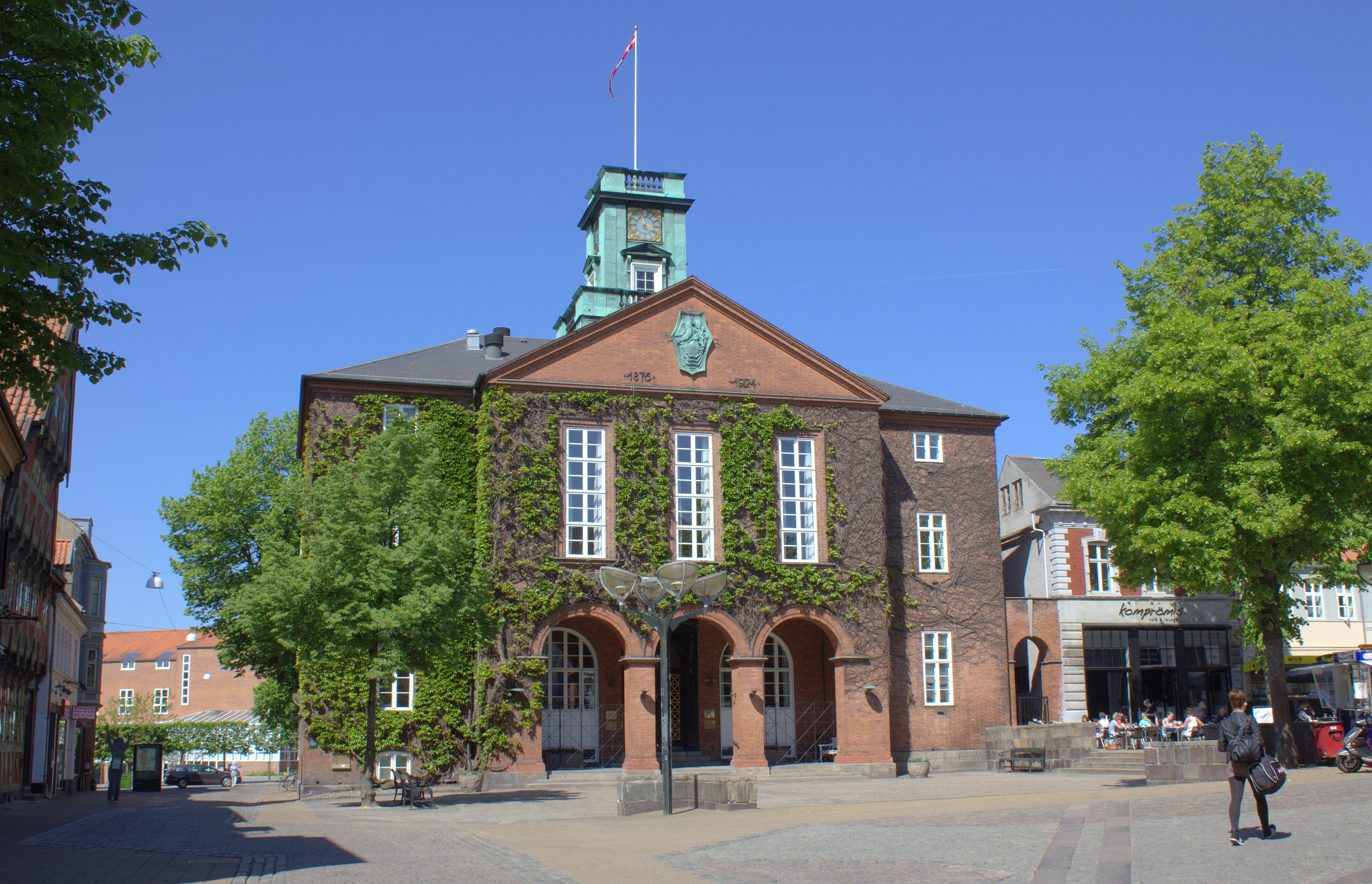
- The rådhus (city hall), where the municipal council convenes.

- Coat of arms

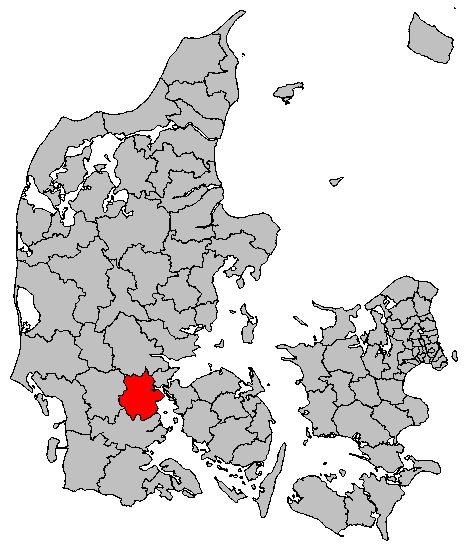
- Coordinates: 55°29′N 9°28′E
- Country: Denmark
- Region: Southern Denmark
- Seat: City of Kolding

Government
  - Body: Municipal council
  - Mayor: Knud Erik Langhoff (Conservative People's Party)

Area
  - Total: 604.5 km^{2} (233.4 sq mi)

Population (1. January 2026)
  - Total: 96,214
  - Density: 159.2/km^{2} (412.2/sq mi)
- Time zone: UTC+1 (CET)
  - Summer (DST): UTC+2 (CEST)
- Postal codes: 6000, 6040, 6051, 6052, 6064, 6070, 6091, 6092, 6093, 6094, 6100, 6560, 6580, 6640
- Website: www.kolding.dk/om-kommunen

Kolding Municipality (Danish: Kolding Kommune) is a kommune in the Region of Southern Denmark on the east coast of the Jutland peninsula in southeast Denmark. The municipality covers an area of 640 km^{2}, and has a total population of 96,214 (2026). Its mayor is Knud Erik Langhoff, a member of the Conservative People's Party. The main city and the site of its municipal council is the seaport city of Kolding, the eighth largest city in Denmark.

Several major Danish motorways intersect in Kolding municipality.

On 1 January 2007 Kolding municipality was, as the result of Kommunalreformen ("The Municipal Reform" of 2007), merged with Christiansfeld, Lunderskov, Vamdrup municipalities, and Vester Nebel Parish in Egtved Municipality to form a new Kolding municipality.

The municipality is part of Triangle Region and of the East Jutland metropolitan area, which had a total population of 1.378 million in 2016.

== Geography ==
To the east is a strait, first called Snævringen ("The Narrowing") and then further south Bredningen ("The Broadening"), that separates the Jutland mainland from the island of Funen in this area, where the two lie very close to each other, often less than 1.5 km apart. Snævringen is an extension of the Kattegat, and begins near the cities of Fredericia and Middelfart, north and east of Kolding municipality. As Snævringen broadens it becomes Bredningen, which opens out into the Little Belt (Lillebælt), the main strait between Jutland and Funen. The municipality of Middelfart on the other side of Snævringen is thus Kolding's municipal neighbor to the east. The island of Fænø lies in Snævringen between Kolding and Middelfart.

Leading directly into the city of Kolding from Snævringen are the waters of Kolding Fjord.

== Population ==
There are 18 cities and towns (as defined by Statistics Denmark as an urban area with a population of at least 200) in the municipality. Of the 89,556 people living in the municipality, 78,695 reside permanently in an urban area, 10,759 reside in rural areas (including localities with less than 200 inhabitants).

=== Locations ===
Kolding	61,000
Vamdrup	4,900
Lunderskov	3,100
Christiansfeld	3,000

Sønder Bjert	2,000
Vester Nebel	1,900
Almind	1,700
Viuf	560

Sønder Stenderup	560
Sjølund	540
Jordrup	540
Ødis	450

== Economy ==
Danish Air Transport has its head office in Vamdrup.

== Attractions ==
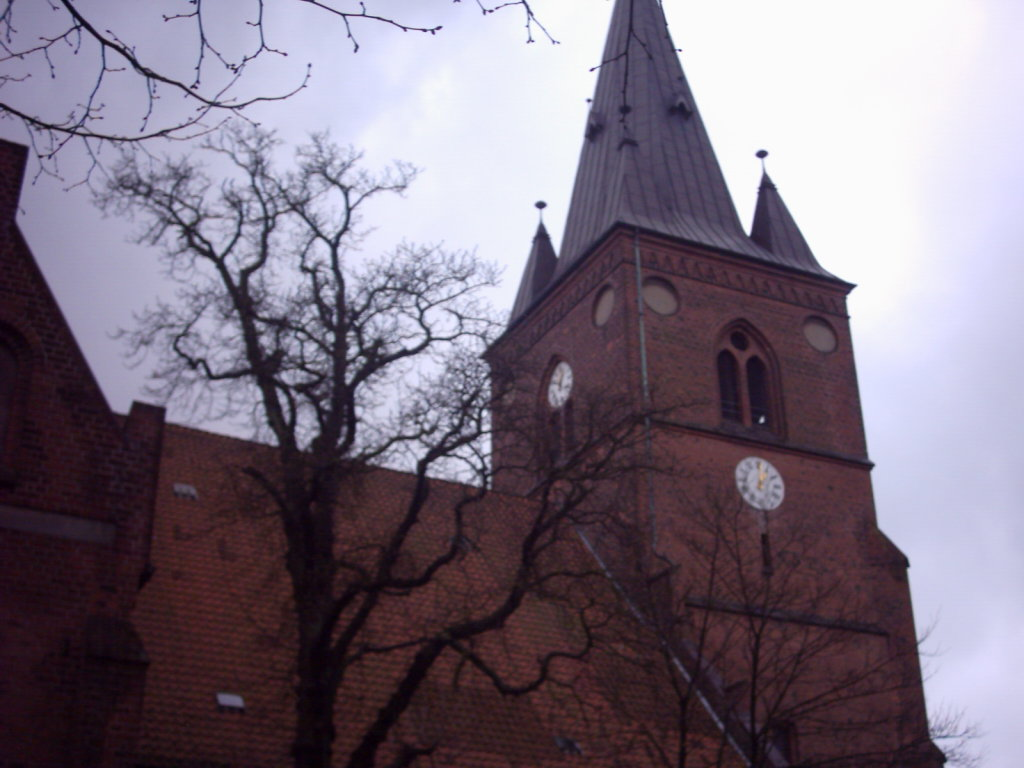
Evangelical Lutheran church in Kolding

The former royal castle of Koldinghus is located in Kolding city. It was built in the 13th century by King Eric Glipping and is now a museum with certain parts of the castle, including its chapel and hall, being used for governmental ceremonial events. It was the last royal residence in Jutland.

Another notable site is the 13th century stone Church of Saint Nicholas, which is one of the oldest in Denmark.

Other popular tourist attractions include the Trapholt Art Museum and the Geographic Garden (Geografisk Have). Trapholt has a collection of Danish arts from 1900 onwards, as well as a smaller number of non-Danish exhibits.

== Politics ==
Kolding's municipal council consists of 25 members, elected every four years. The municipal council has ten political committees.

=== Municipal council ===
Below are the municipal councils elected since the Municipal Reform of 2007.

Election	Party							Total seats	Turnout	Elected mayor
Election	A	B	C	F	O	V	Ø	Total seats	Turnout	Elected mayor
2005	12	2	4	2	3	8		31	67.8%	Per Bødker Andersen (A)
2009	6	1	3	5	5	11		31	68.1%	Jørn Pedersen (V)
2013	6	1	1	1	3	12	1	25	72.0%	Jørn Pedersen (V)
2017	5	1		2	3	13	1	25	71.9%	Jørn Pedersen (V)
2021	5	2	3	4	2	9		25	69.1%	Knud Erik Langhoff (C)
Data from Kmdvalg.dk 2005, 2009, 2013, 2017 and 2021

== Sources ==
- Municipal statistics: NetBorger Kommunefakta, delivered from KMD aka Kommunedata (Municipal Data)
- Municipal mergers and neighbors: Eniro new municipalities map
