= Christiansfeld =

Town in Denmark

- Town
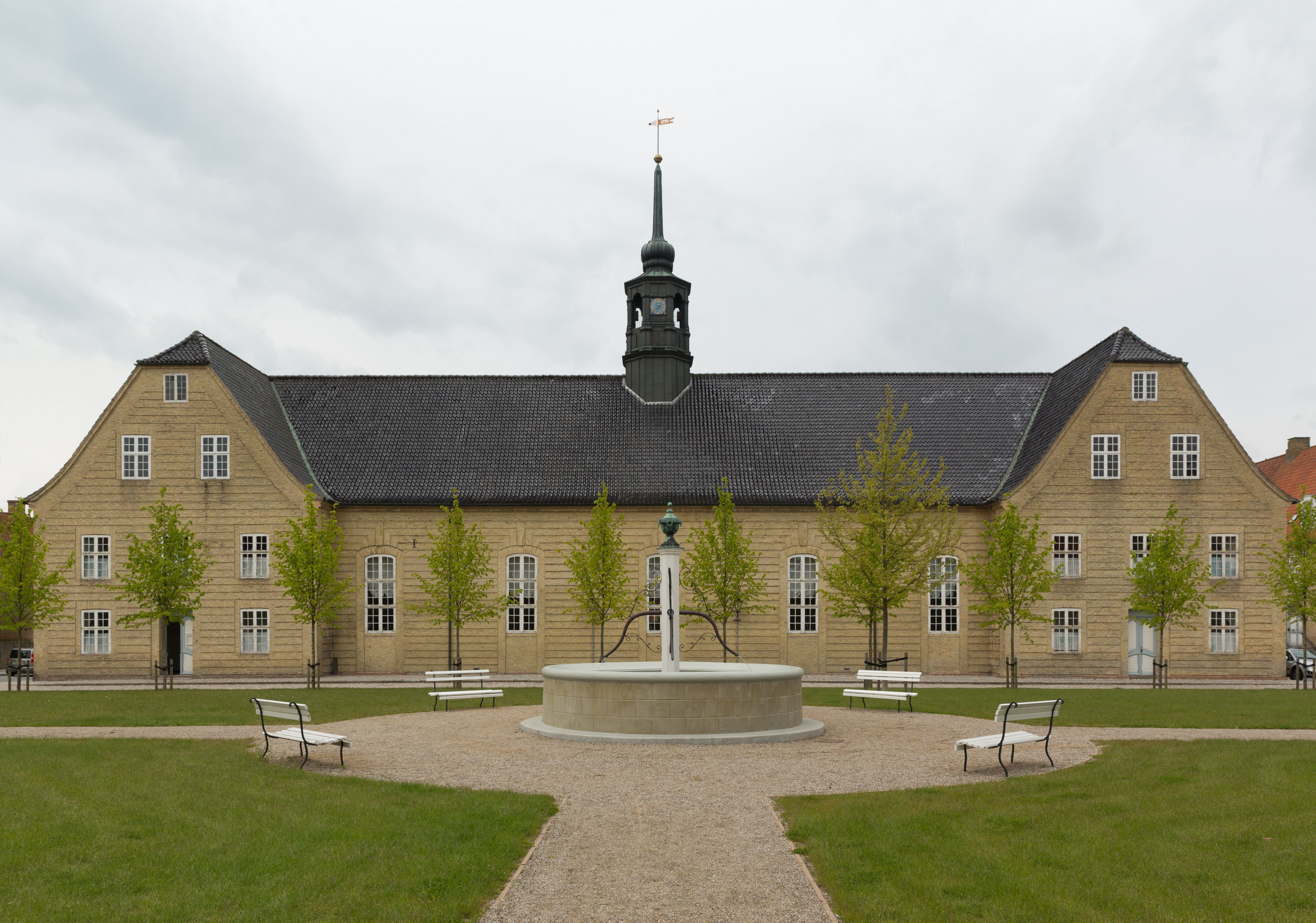
- The Moravian Church in Christiansfeld

- Coat of arms

- Location within Denmark Location within Region of Southern Denmark
- Coordinates: 55.35667°N 9.48635°E
- Country: Denmark
- Region: Southern Denmark (Syddanmark)
- Municipality: Kolding

Area
  - Urban: 2.6 km^{2} (1.0 sq mi)

Population (2026)
  - Urban: 3,105
  - Urban density: 1,200/km^{2} (3,100/sq mi)
- Time zone: UTC+1 (CET)
  - Summer (DST): UTC+2 (CEST)
- Postal code: 6070 Christiansfeld
- Website: www.christiansfeldcentret.dk (in Danish)

UNESCO World Heritage Site
- Official name: Christiansfeld
- Part of: Moravian Church Settlements
- Criteria: iii, iv
- Reference: 1468
- Inscription: 2015 (39th Session)

Christiansfeld, with a population of 3,105 (1 January 2026), is a town in Kolding Municipality in Southern Jutland in Region of Southern Denmark. The town was founded in 1773 by the Moravian Church and named after the Danish king Christian VII. Since July 2015 it has been a UNESCO World Heritage Site, highlighting its status as the best-preserved example of the town-planning and architecture of the Moravian Church.

== Description ==
The town was constructed around a central Church Square bordered by two parallel streets running east to west. The Hall, Sister's House, fire-house, the vicarage, and the former provost’s house were built directly around the square, and shops, Brother's House, family residences, a hotel, and a school were built along the parallel streets. Many of the residential buildings are communal, which were typical of Moravian settlements and were used by the widows and unmarried women and men of the congregation. The architecture of Christiansfeld is homogeneous, dominated by one or two-story buildings made out of yellow brick and red tile roofs. Many of the buildings in Christiansfeld retain their original uses.

== History ==
Most of Christiansfeld was constructed in the years 1773–1800, following a strict city plan that drew inspiration from the earlier Moravian settlements of Herrnhaag and Gnadau. To encourage construction, king Christian VII promised a ten-year tax holiday for the city and paid 10% of the construction costs of new houses. By 1779, the town's population reached 279, and by 1782, it had about 400 residents. It was one of many towns in Schleswig officially designated a small market town (flække).

In 1864, Christiansfeld and the rest of Schleswig was ceded to Prussia as a result of Denmark's defeat in the Second Schleswig War. It remained a part of Germany until 1920 when, as a part of a plebiscite called for by the Treaty of Versailles, Northern Schleswig voted to rejoin Denmark. After reunification, the Moravian church lost some of the rights it had obtained as a part of the town's founding in the 18th century. For example, it no longer had the ability to choose the town's leadership, paving the way for the town's first Danish mayor who was not a member of the church in 1920. The church also sold its schools at this time due to the declining membership of its congregation.

From 1970 to 2007, the town was the administrative seat of Christiansfeld Municipality, but it lost this status and was placed in the Kolding Municipality as a part of the Municipal Reform of 2007 (Kommunalreformen 2007).

In 2009 Kolding Municipality and Realdania-foundation agreed on a 100 million DKK restoration project of the inner-city. In 2012 the A.P. Møller og Hustru Chastine Mc-Kinney Møllers Fond donated 60 million DKK for the restoration of the Sister's House.

== Today ==
Today, the city is a tourist attraction. The city and Moravian Church draw thousands of tourists each year. Its preserved architecture is one of the reasons it was nominated as a tentative UNESCO World Heritage Site in 1993 formally added to the UNESCO main list on 4 July 2015.

The town is famed for its honey cakes. These are baked to a secret recipe from 1783. Until 2008, the cakes were baked in the original 18th-century bakery, which was then renovated because of new national sanitary standards, but still uses the original recipes.

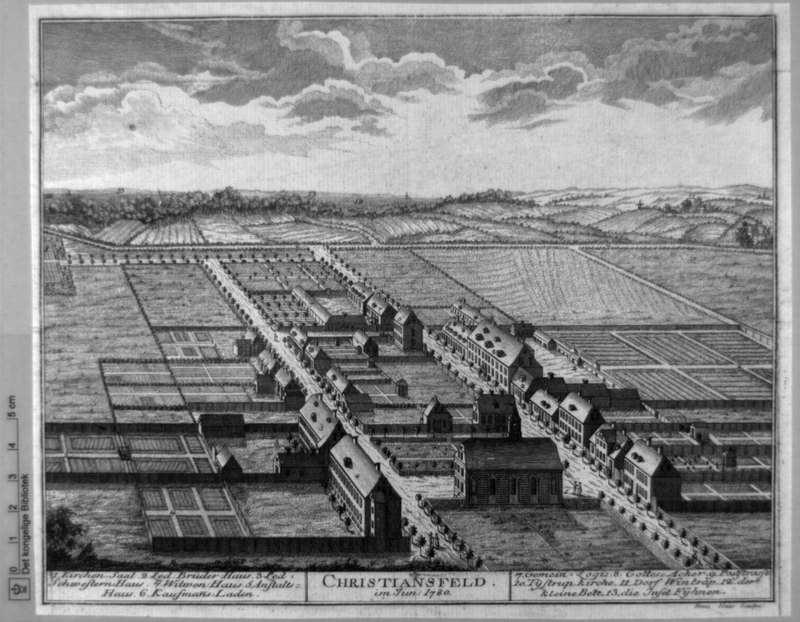
Christiansfeld 1780

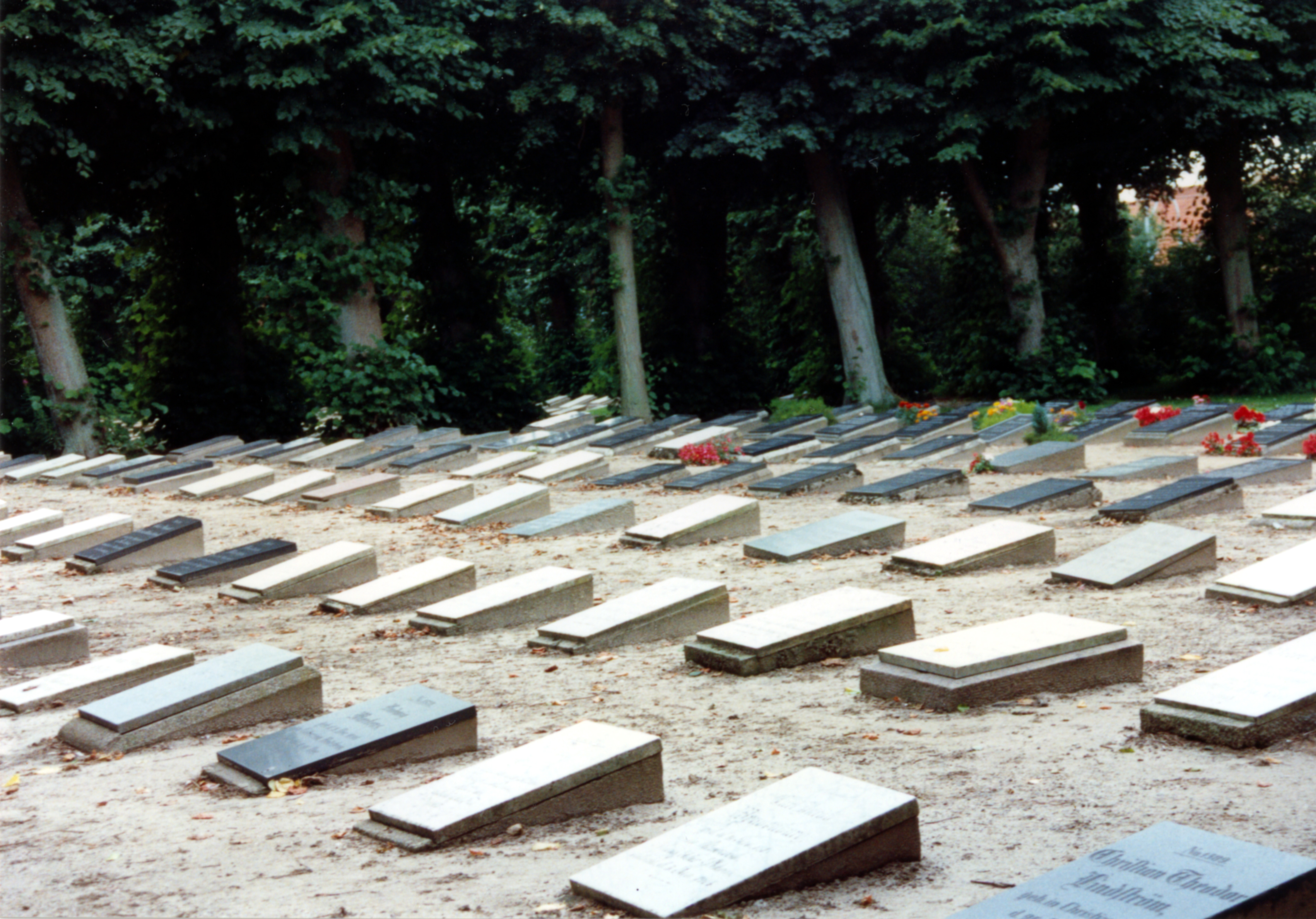
The church cemetery

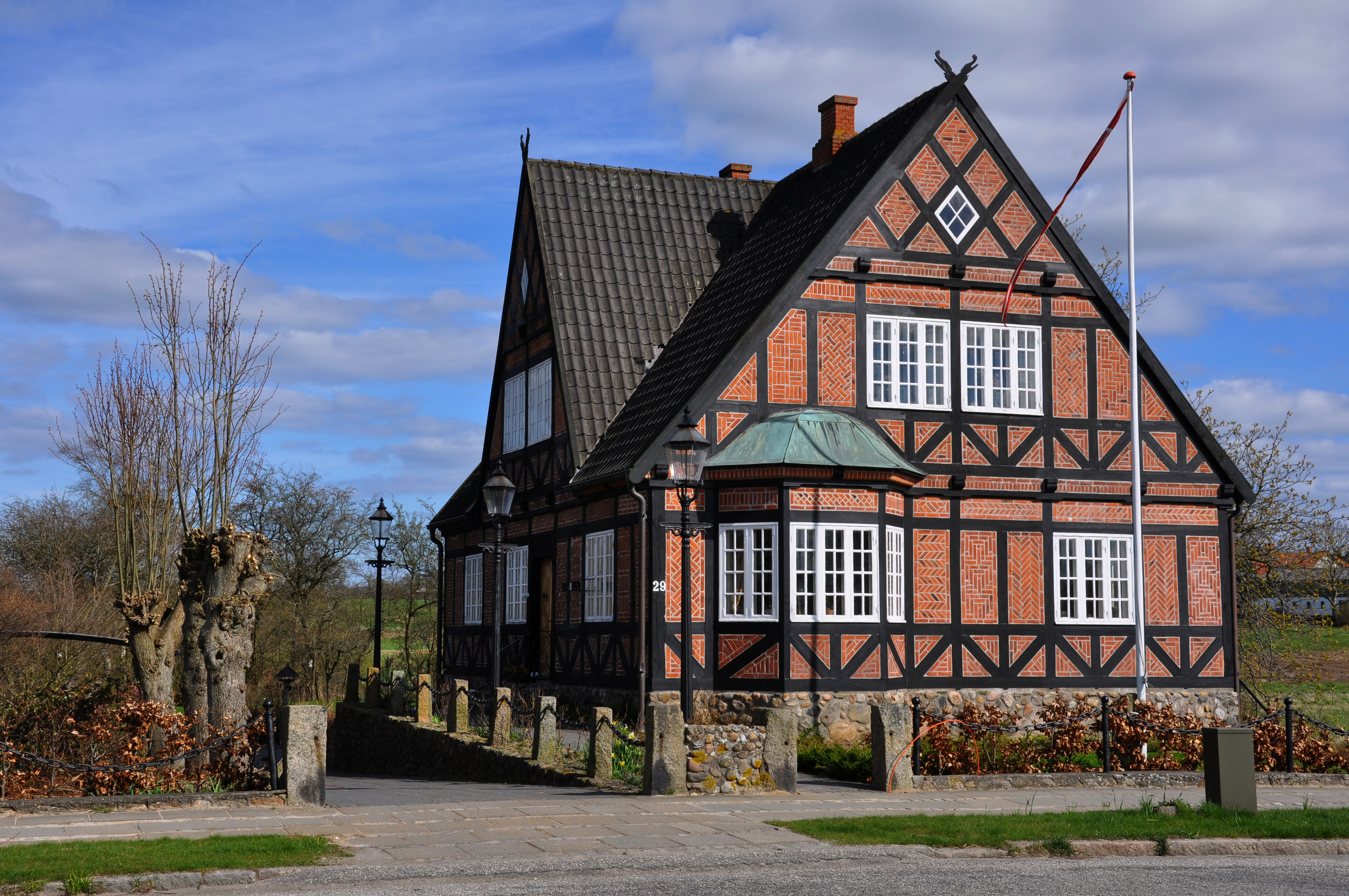
House in Christiansfeld

== Notable people ==
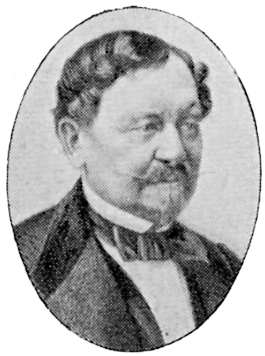
Carl Fredrik Kiörboe, 1901

- Christian David Gebauer (1777–1831) a German-born Danish animal and landscape painter, brought up in Christiansfeld
- Carl Fredrik Kiörboe (1799 in Christiansfeld – 1876) a Danish-born Swedish artist, painted animals
- George Frederic Bahnson (1805 in Christiansfeld – 1869), bishop of the Moravian Church in the United States
- Johann Christian Gebauer (1808–1884) a Danish composer, organist and music theorist, brought up in Christiansfeld
- Camilla Collett (1813–1895) a Norwegian writer, maybe the first Norwegian feminist, went to school in Christiansfeld
- Samuel Kleinschmidt (1814 in Greenland – 1886) a German/Danish missionary, teacher in Christiansfeld 1837–1841
- Theodor Brorsen (1819–1895) a Danish astronomer, discovered of five comets; went to school in Christiansfeld
- Carl Bock (1849–1932) a Norwegian government official, author, naturalist and explorer; went to school in Christiansfeld
- Hans Lunding (1899 in Stepping, near Christiansfeld – 1984) military officer and head of the combined army and naval intelligence services; also a bronze medallist in the 1936 Summer Olympics
- Henrik Toft (born 1981 in Christiansfeld) a Danish professional footballer, who currently plays for Kolding BK
- Maya Olesen (born 1991 in Christiansfeld), competitor for Denmark in Miss World 2011

== See also ==
- Christiansfeld Pharmacy
