= 2025 Fredericia municipal election =

Municipal election in Denmark

← 2021	18 November 2025	2029 →

All 21 seats to the Fredericia municipal council 11 seats needed for a majority
- Turnout: 28,350 (66.5%) ▲1.9%
	First party	Second party	Third party
	V	A	O
Party	Venstre	Social Democrats	Danish People's Party
Last election	5 seats, 22.0%	9 seats, 37.3%	2 seats, 7.7%
Seats won	6	5	2
Seat change	▲1	▼4	0
Popular vote	6,125	6,581	2,944
Percentage	22.1%	23.7%	10.6%
Swing	▲0.1%	▼13.6%	▲2.9%
	Fourth party	Fifth party	Sixth party
	F	Ø	C
Party	Green Left	Red-Green Alliance	Conservatives
Last election	1 seat, 4.3%	1 seat, 7.0%	2 seats, 9.7%
Seats won	2	2	2
Seat change	▲1	▲1	0
Popular vote	2,570	2,471	2,368
Percentage	9.3%	8.9%	8.5%
Swing	▲4.9%	▲1.9%	▼1.1%
	Seventh party	Eighth party
	I	Æ
Party	Liberal Alliance	Denmark Democrats
Last election	0 seats, 0.5%	Did not stand
Seats won	1	1
Seat change	▲1	▲1
Popular vote	1,654	1,201
Percentage	6.0%	4.3%
Swing	▲5.5%	New
Mayor before election
Christian Bro
Social Democrats
Mayor after election
Peder Tind
Venstre

The 2025 Fredericia Municipal election was held on November 18, 2025, to elect the 21 members to sit in the regional council for the Fredericia Municipal council, in the period of 2026 to 2029. Peder Tind from Venstre, would win the mayoral position.

== Background ==
Following the 2021 election, Steen Wrist from Social Democrats became mayor for his first fully elected term. However, Wrist, just like his predecessor, stepped down as mayor. Christian Bro, also from the Social Democrats, took over the mayoral position on April 23, 2024. He would run for election.

== Electoral system ==
For elections to Danish municipalities, a number varying from 9 to 31 are chosen to be elected to the municipal council. The seats are then allocated using the D'Hondt method and a closed list proportional representation. Fredericia Municipality had 21 seats in 2025.

== Electoral alliances ==
=== Electoral Alliance 1 ===
Party		Political alignment
B	Social Liberals	Centre to Centre-left
F	Green Left	Centre-left to Left-wing
G	Grøn Kultur	Local politics
Ø	Red-Green Alliance	Left-wing to Far-Left

=== Electoral Alliance 2 ===
Party		Political alignment
C	Conservatives	Centre-right
M	Moderates	Centre to Centre-right
Å	The Alternative	Centre-left to Left-wing

=== Electoral Alliance 3 ===
Party		Political alignment
I	Liberal Alliance	Centre-right to Right-wing
J	Borgernes Liste 7000	Local politics
O	Danish People's Party	Right-wing to Far-right
V	Venstre	Centre-right
Æ	Denmark Democrats	Right-wing to Far-right

== Results by polling station ==
Division	A	B	C	F	G	I	J	M	O	P	V	Æ	Ø	Å
Division	%	%	%	%	%	%	%	%	%	%	%	%	%	%
Gymnasiet 1	24.7	2.0	7.9	12.3	0.1	5.4	1.9	0.7	10.3	0.4	18.0	4.0	11.6	0.6
Bredstrup-Pjedsted	30.3	0.7	7.0	6.6	0.2	4.7	2.5	0.5	10.5	0.1	25.5	5.8	5.1	0.6
Erritsø	20.6	2.6	10.2	9.1	0.1	8.0	2.8	0.9	9.9	0.2	24.2	4.1	6.9	0.5
Herslev	16.1	1.4	3.8	4.5	0.0	5.2	10.4	0.0	14.7	0.0	28.1	11.3	4.3	0.2
Taulov	17.2	3.8	12.6	6.7	0.1	7.3	1.8	3.9	9.4	0.1	24.7	6.4	5.2	0.6
Søndermarken	29.5	1.2	6.1	8.8	0.2	4.5	2.1	0.6	11.0	0.2	21.1	3.7	10.5	0.4
Bøgeskov	25.9	1.9	8.1	7.5	0.1	4.9	3.2	0.4	9.9	0.8	24.7	4.8	7.2	0.5
Indre By	23.5	1.8	8.3	10.3	0.3	6.6	1.7	0.9	11.3	0.3	18.6	3.6	11.9	0.9
Gymnasiet 2	23.9	1.4	7.7	10.6	0.2	4.6	3.4	0.7	11.6	0.1	22.3	3.3	9.9	0.4

== Results ==
Party		Votes	%	+/-	Seats	+/-
Fredericia Municipality
A	Social Democrats	6,581	23.73	-13.60	5	-4
V	Venstre	6,125	22.08	+0.09	6	+1
O	Danish People's Party	2,944	10.61	+2.95	2	0
F	Green Left	2,570	9.27	+4.95	2	+1
Ø	Red-Green Alliance	2,471	8.91	+1.88	2	+1
C	Conservatives	2,368	8.54	-1.13	2	0
I	Liberal Alliance	1,654	5.96	+5.49	1	+1
Æ	Denmark Democrats	1,201	4.33	New	1	New
J	Borgernes Liste 7000	695	2.51	New	0	New
B	Social Liberals	561	2.02	-0.15	0	0
M	Moderates	310	1.12	New	0	New
Å	The Alternative	149	0.54	-0.63	0	0
P	Liste P	64	0.23	New	0	New
G	Grøn Kultur	44	0.16	New	0	New
Total		27,737	100	N/A	21	N/A
Invalid votes		68	0.16	-0.17		
Blank votes		545	1.28	+0.02		
Turnout		28,350	66.49	+1.89		
Source: valg.dk

== Opinion polls ==
Polling firm	Fieldwork date	Sample size	A	V	C	O	Ø	F	B	Å	I	G	J	M	P	Æ	Others	Lead
Fredericia-Gymnasium			26.9 (6)	20.6 (5)	6.4 (1)	8.5 (2)	9.4 (2)	13.5 (3)	–	–	5.1 (1)	–	–	–	–	3.8 (1)	–	6.3
Epinion	4 Sep - 13 Oct 2025	464	33.2	16.7	5.1	7.7	7.2	8.8	2.7	1.5	7.2	–	–	0.6	–	8.6	0.8	16.5
2024 european parliament election	9 Jun 2024		19.2	15.0	8.9	8.5	4.1	14.9	5.0	2.2	7.7	–	–	6.5	–	8.0	–	4.2
2022 general election	1 Nov 2022		33.6	11.2	4.7	2.9	3.3	6.7	2.1	1.8	7.9	–	–	10.1	–	9.4	–	22.4
2021 regional election	16 Nov 2021		33.2	33.4	6.5	5.3	4.5	5.2	2.5	0.6	0.8	–	–	–	–	–	–	0.2
2021 municipal election	16 Nov 2021		37.3 (9)	22.0 (5)	9.7 (2)	7.7 (2)	7.0 (1)	4.3 (1)	2.2 (0)	1.2 (0)	0.5 (0)	–	–	–	–	–	–	15.3
