= Listed buildings in Fredericia Municipality =

This is a list of listed buildings in Fredericia Municipality, Denmark.

== Listed buildings ==
Listing name	Image	Location	Coordinates	Description
Bruuns Pakhus		Kirkestræde 3, 7000 Fredericia		
Egeskov Kirkegård, Den Bruunske Pavillon		Vejlby Kirkevej 55, 7000 Fredericia		
Fredericia Fæstning		Bajonetten 11, 7000 Fredericia		
Fredericia Fæstning		Danmarksgade 1A, 7000 Fredericia		
Fredericia Fæstning		Øster Voldgade 1, 7000 Fredericia		
Fredericia Fæstning		Øster Voldgade 21, 7000 Fredericia		
Fredericia Fæstning		Nørre Voldgade 15, 7000 Fredericia		Prinsens Port.
Gades Gård		Kongensgade 9A, 7000 Fredericia		
Gades Gård		Kongensgade 9A, 7000 Fredericia		
Gammelby Vandmølle		Gammelby Møllevej 62, 7000 Fredericia		
Gammelby Vandmølle		Gammelby Møllevej 62, 7000 Fredericia		
Hans de Hofmans Gård		Vendersgade 32, 7000 Fredericia		
Herslev Præstegård		Herslev Bygade 8, 7000 Fredericia		
Herslev Præstegård		Herslev Bygade 8, 7000 Fredericia		
Herslev Præstegård		Herslev Bygade 8A, 7000 Fredericia		
Kongensgade 15		Kongensgade 15, 7000 Fredericia		
Kongensgade 15		Kongensgade 15, 7000 Fredericia		
Kongensgade 15		Kongensgade 15, 7000 Fredericia		
Kraches Gård		Vendersgade 63, 7000 Fredericia		
Kringsminde		Kringsmindevej 9, 7000 Fredericia		
Kringsminde		Kringsmindevej 9, 7000 Fredericia		
Kringsminde		Kringsmindevej 9, 7000 Fredericia		
Landsoldaten		Ved Landsoldaten 0, 7000 Fredericia		
Ødstedgård		Stallerupvej 43A, 7000 Fredericia		Neoclassical main building, originally built in the 17th century but completely altered in c. 1790.
Ødstedgård		Stallerupvej 43A, 7000 Fredericia		South pavilion.
Ødstedgård		Stallerupvej 43A, 7000 Fredericia		
Prinsensgade 39 A-B		Prinsensgade 39A, 7000 Fredericia		
Prinsensgade 39 A-B		Prinsensgade 39A, 7000 Fredericia		
Prinsensgade 12		Prinsensgade 12, 7000 Fredericia		
Mosaisk Begravelsesplads		Slesvigsgade 2, 7000 Fredericia		
Nordstjernen		Kongensgade 25, 7000 Fredericia		
Provstegården, senere Rektorbolig og Latinskole		Danmarksgade 61, 7000 Fredericia		
Reformert Kirke		Dronningensgade 87B, 7000 Fredericia		
Reformert Præstegård		Dronningensgade 68, 7000 Fredericia		
Reformert Skole		Dronningensgade 87, 7000 Fredericia		
Sankt Knuds Kirke		Sjællandsgade 48, 7000 Fredericia		
Sankt Knuds Kirke		Sjællandsgade 48, 7000 Fredericia		
Thiellesens Hus		Prinsessegade 10, 7000 Fredericia		
Ting- og Arresthuset		Vendersgade 30D, 7000 Fredericia		
Tøjhuset, Fredericia		Gothersgade 34, 7000 Fredericia		
Vendersgade 30		Vendersgade 30B, 7000 Fredericia		

== Delisted buildings ==
Listing name	Image	Location	Coordinates	Description
Prinsensgade 14		Prinsensgade 14, 7000 Fredericia		
