= Taulov =

Town in Denmark

- Town
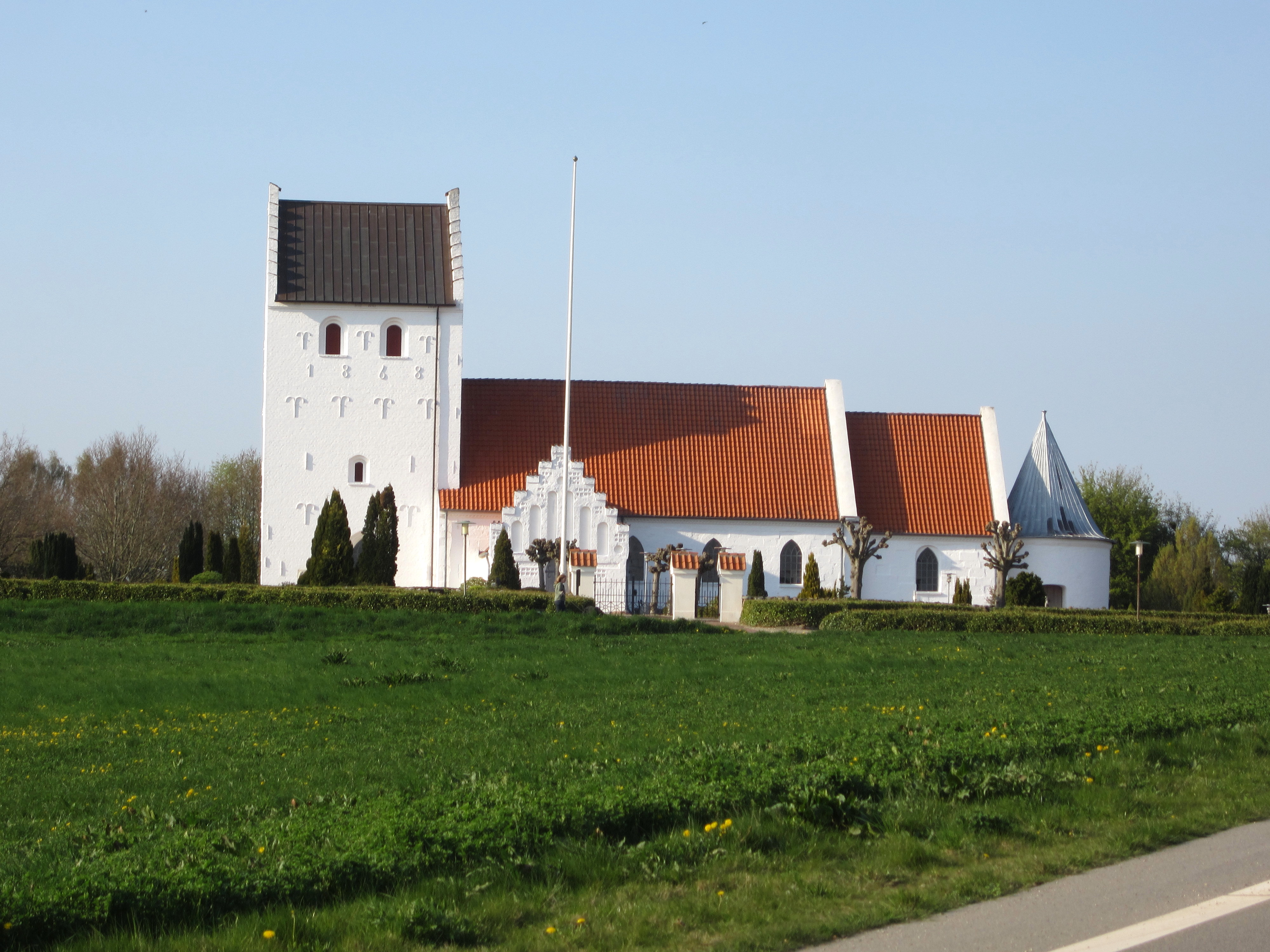
- Taulov Church

- Location in Denmark Taulov (Region of Southern Denmark)
- Coordinates: 55°32′26″N 9°36′40″E
- Country: Denmark
- Region: Southern Denmark
- Municipality: Fredericia Municipality

Area
  - Urban: 6.1 km^{2} (2.4 sq mi)

Population (2026)
  - Urban: 3,593
  - Urban density: 590/km^{2} (1,500/sq mi)
- Time zone: UTC+1 (CET)
  - Summer (DST): UTC+2 (CEST)
- Postal code: DK-7000 Fredericia

Taulov is a town located in Fredericia Municipality in the eastern part of the Jutland peninsula in Denmark. The town is, with a population of 3,593 (1 January 2026), the second largest in the municipality.

Taulov's history is not that well known and it was nothing more than a village until the first railroads in Jutland were built in the 1860s during the industrial revolution. It is now divided into Gammel Taulov (Old Taulov) and Taulov by the motorway, despite Taulov Church being located in Taulov. Old Taulov grew up around the train station and the new main street while the majority of Taulov is squeezed in between the E20 motorway and Kolding Landevej, the old main road between Kolding and Snoghøj, which was the main way to access Eastern Denmark for many centuries.

Taulov Church is a medieval church in traditional Danish style, and was constructed in the 13th century. It functioned as a seamark for sailors on Kolding Fjord and Little Belt until modern navigation was introduced. As the natural centre of Taulov, it is located approximate 9 km (5.6 mi) from Fredericia, 10 km (6.2 mi) from Kolding and 20 km (12 mi) from Vejle.

== History ==
The name Taulov has existed for many hundreds of years, probably because of the word "tavle" as in Tavle Mark; this led to the name of Tavlov Nebel (Nebel meaning a place high above its surroundings) which eventually became Taulov.

Taulov has had settlements for the last 2,500 years, many remnants of which have been discovered recently as farmland has been developed for housing. The Church is from the 13th century and is placed on Tavlhøj, one of the highest points in the area, right on the edge of Elbodalen.

Taulov Parish is significant because of its proximity to the historically important city of Kolding. The parish had a castle designed to protect Kolding Fjord close to the church. Little remains today of Høneborg Castle beyond the raised earth where it once stood, now a small hill used for livestock. This castle has had a huge influence on Taulov Church, and the two royal sisters who were residents of the castle are buried in the apse of the church. The circular apse is in local history said to be the only one of its kind north of the Alps.

King Frederik III founded the town of Fredericia in 1650 just 12 km (7.5 mi) from Taulov, and to ensure its growth and success had several nearby villages demolished, moving their residents to the new city and reusing the stones from their churches for the new fortifications and churches of Fredericia. This left few villages and churches in the area, and Taulov village and Taulov Church among the few to survive from the medieval period.

Taulov was a village for centuries, but when the railroad between Kolding and Fredericia was built in the 1860s, Taulov started to grow around and along the railroad. Over the next hundred years, Taulov grew from village to town. The railroad stimulated industrial and retail growth and the community eventually became a municipality in its own right, known as Taulov Kommune, governed from Tavlhøj near the church and school. During this time, Taulov Bygade boasted several shops and the only co-operative supermarket, Brugsen, in the area.

The 1970's saw the construction of the Danish motorways and with them came accelerated development in Taulov. In the 1970 Danish Municipal Reform, Taulov Kommune became a part of Fredericia Kommune, with Tavlhøj later becoming a senior citizens' activity center. Since the 1990s, more and more shops have closed down or relocated to Fredericia or Kolding, leaving few shops in the town.

Taulov's nearest neighbor is the small harbor town of Skærbæk, south of Taulov at Kolding Fjord, which serves as its recreational and commercial port. The two towns have long had a close relationship and share many public and cultural institutions including schools, sports facilities, churches, and clubs, and the area is often referred to as "Taulov-Skærbæk". Skærbæk's power plant, Skærbækværket, was historically among the two towns' largest workplaces and its owner Ørsted A/S, is still a major employer in the area.

== Industry ==
Due to the very central location in Denmark with both a railroad and a motorway, and the large Fredericia Harbour nearby, Taulov grew into a national cargo hub in the 1980s and 1990s. Today, Taulov boasts of the local firm Veksø, one of Denmark's largest producers of street furniture and fixtures as well as several international cargo firms, among them the largest cargo center in Scandinavia. Furthermore, the city has the largest cheese factory in Europe as well as two smaller cheese factories producing, among other things, Castello cheeses, exporting mostly products for Arla Foods. Taulov is one of the most important industrial and cargo areas in the combined network between seven municipalities known as Trekantsområdet.

With new industrial and retail park DanmarkC, the industrial areas of Fredercia and Taulov are gradually merging along the motorway and rail corridor creating a 10 km (6.2 mi) long industrial and retail corridor stretching from Taulov to the Little Belt Bridge along two international motorways.

== Locations ==
Taulov doesn't contain many attractions, although it has some well known locations on a regional scale.

"Den dybe betydnings sted" is a Buddhist center placed in Taulov as part of the Karma Kadjy School. It is growing rapidly according to the center itself, and is considering expanding.

"Kryb-i-ly Kro" is a very popular and somewhat famous Kro (inn) on the edge of Taulov. The story goes that on a cold and windy night, the Danish king was heading from Kolding to Snoghøj to cross Little Belt as he decided to find some place to hide from the weather. As he saw a small farm, he allegedly said "kryb i ly"("seek shelter"), thereby naming the farm and the inn that was later built right next to it. The original inn was consumed by flames, but it was rebuilt and still sits on an impressive view over Kolding Fjord.

Taulov has been a popular site for settlements in the Iron Age and Bronze Age, and the area contains several tombs and findings of old settlements. One of the recent findings was found when the second motorway in the area was being built just north of the town. The tomb now sits at a gas station further north along the new E45 motorway and is one of the largest found in Jutland.

Elbohallen is the local sports center originally built on a field between the two towns, but now lies within the boundaries of Taulov. Other than being the home to most of the local sports teams, it has a community/party hall, a cafeteria, a youth centre and is used for balls, fairs and markets. It is also one of the preferred centers for disability sport events on a regional level.

Several times during the last couple of decades, Taulov has been connected with prestigious projects which could have given the town a boost. Some of the projects included a new International Standard stadium and an IKEA store, as well as a large indoor skiing ramp and vacation centres.

The latest discussions are concerning a large regional hospital replacing the hospitals in Kolding, Vejle and Fredericia.

== Culture ==
Taulov has a population of 3,593 as of 1 January 2026, and the population growth has been slow for many years. But in recent years, the town has been growing, as Trekantsområdet has been growing in importance and size.

Sports clubs have had a few years of success in the combined club between Taulov and the neighbouring town Skærbæk at the Little Belt, Taulov-Skæbæk IF. But in recent years, the club has lost its best players who instead have moved to Kolding and Fredericia who have teams in the best leagues. Almost all sports clubs in the two towns are based in Elbohallen with a few clubs based on schools.

Taulov currently shares a monthly newsletter/paper with Skærbæk called Tau-bæk Nyt. It is a non-profit organisation dependent on volunteer writers and uses income from ads for printing and distribution. It is used by local clubs and organisations to share news and keep people up to date.

== Notable people ==
- Stine Knudsen (born 1992 in Taulov) a Danish handball player who currently plays for København Håndbold.
