= Little Belt (ship) =

At least six vessels, including two belonging to the British Royal Navy, have borne the name Little Belt, a translation from the Danish of Lillebælt, the name of the strait that separates Funen from the Danish mainland and that links the Kattegat to the Baltic Sea. The merchant vessels and the second Royal Navy vessel were named to commemorate HMS Little Belt, which was one of the protagonists in the Little Belt affair, or perhaps the affair itself.

- Little Belt was a brig of 173 tons (bm) built in Canada in 1811 that the French frigate Aréthuse captured in January 1813.
- Little Belt was a snow of 133 tons (bm) built at Sunderland in 1813, and wrecked on 28 February 1820 near Cape Palos as she was sailing from Palermo to London.
- Little Belt was a schooner of six tons (bm), one gun, and a crew of 20 men under the command of Captain David L. Sheffield. She was an American privateer during the War of 1812, commissioned on 10 September 1812 at New York, but seems to have little further trace of her herself or her activities.
- Little Belt was an American sloop of 18 tons (bm) and 3 men, sailing from New York to Charleston, that HMS Armide destroyed on 26 September 1813 off "the Capes" after taking of her cargo.
- See also: HMS Little Belt

Citations

References

- Emmons, George Foster (1853) The navy of the United States, from the commencement, 1775 to 1853; with a brief history of each vessel’s service and fate ... Comp. by Lieut. George F. Emmons ... under the authority of the Navy Dept. To which is added a list of private armed vessels, fitted out under the American flag ... also a list of the revenue and coast survey vessels, and principal ocean steamers, belonging to citizens of the United States in 1850. (Washington: Gideon & Co.)
