= Skærbæk =

Skærbæk may refer to:

- Skærbæk, Tønder Municipality, a town in Southern Denmark
  - Skærbæk Municipality, a former municipality
- Skærbæk, Fredericia Municipality, a town in Southern Denmark
