= Triangle Region (Denmark) =

Coordinates: 55°36′37″N 9°35′33″E

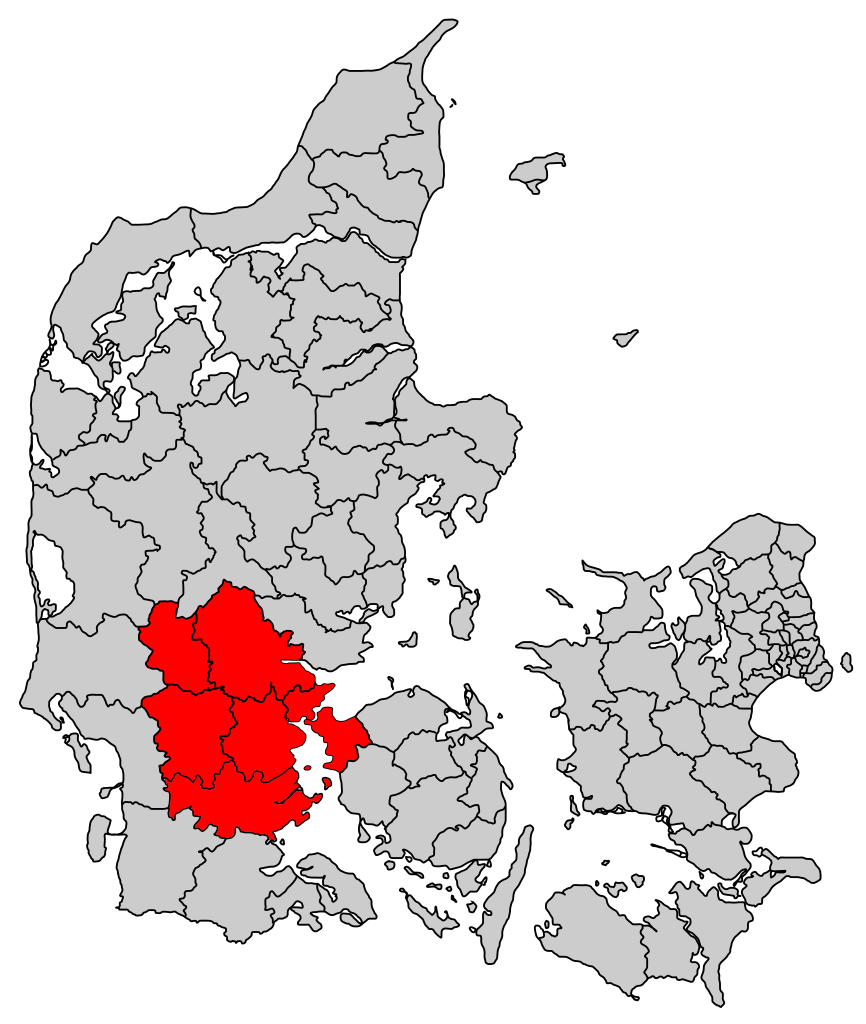
Triangle Region (Trekantområdet) in Denmark

The Triangle Region (Danish: Trekantområdet [ˈtʁeːkandˌɔmʁoðəd]) is a cooperation consisting of seven Danish municipalities on the Danish peninsula of Jutland and the island of Funen: Billund, Fredericia, Haderslev, Kolding, Middelfart, Vejen and Vejle. It is not an official administrative Region of Denmark.

The Triangle Region began as the general term for the industrial and communications hubs of Kolding, Vejle and Fredericia in the early 1960s. The three cities (thus ‘triangle’) originally worked together to coordinate and collaborate locally, but have since expanded into a cooperation between seven municipalities, which together have 421,480 inhabitants (as of 1 January 2018) and cover an area of 4,266.0 km².

An area of political and economic stability, the Triangle Region is often regarded as Denmark’s third major region after Aarhus and Copenhagen. It has a reputation for having lower levels of pollution, crime and traffic problems than the big cities.

== History ==
The Triangle Region was historically an industrial area with an emphasis on production and logistics but more recently, it has become a hub for entrepreneurs, tourism and energy companies. A formal cooperation between municipalities in the region began in 1994 and the current Triangle Area Denmark was established in 2007 by the new municipalities of Billund, Fredericia, Kolding, Middelfart, Vejen and Vejle. Haderslev joined in 2016.

=== Billund ===
Billund was first mentioned as "Byllundt" in the year 1454 and as "Billund" in 1510. In 1916, Ole Kirk Christiansen, who would later found LEGO, bought a Billund furniture company that was founded in 1895. He invested in the town, creating a new dairy and the Skjoldbjerg church. In 1930, Kirk Christiansen began producing utility items such as ironing boards, stepladders and miniature toys. His first toys were created from leftover production scraps but his true toy production started in 1932. In 1934, the toy factory was named "LEGO." A small town, Billund today is most notable as the home of the LEGO Group, for LEGOLAND, and for Billund Airport, the second largest airport in Denmark. The airport opened in 1964 and was built by the LEGO Group, but is now run independently.

=== Fredericia ===
Fredericia was designed and built in 1650 by Frederick III as the principal fortress for Jutland. When the city was built, the King gave certain privileges to the city such a freedom of religion and asylum, giving the city a unique diversity (in comparison with the rest of the country) that is still visible today. In 1849 the Danes defeated the Prussians at Fredericia. The fortress was closed in 1909, and the city's modern development began. Fredericia Harbor is among Denmark's busiest and most important harbors. The city has traditionally been famed for the manufacture of refined petroleum, chemicals, textiles, frozen fish, machinery, and tobacco, as well as import from especially Asia and the now closed ship yard.

Taulov, located halfway between Fredericia and Kolding, is the main village of a parish that historically was home to a local vassal, making it the administrative center of the area known as Elbo Herred. Despite recent finds of significant burial mounds and farm houses dating back to the Danish Iron Age, the village itself has little to no significance and was a small railway town with its own municipality until the 1970s, after which it became part of Fredericia Municipality and the arrival of the motorway gave the village a growth spur. The combination of the railroad and motorway has made Taulov an important focal point for the Triangle Region in terms of infrastructure, as the area is unique in having railroad and motorway junctions connecting the area to all of Denmark, Germany and the rest of Scandinavia, and the proximity to one of Denmark's largest harbors and the nearby Billund Airport. The 'Taulov Transport Center' was designated as a 'Core Rail Road Terminal' by the European Union in 2014. The village is also home to various manufacturing facilities such as an Arla Foods export plant and Veksø A/S, a street furniture manufacturing company, and the new 'DanmarkC' area between Taulov and Fredericia is expanding greatly with retail and storage facilities. A new train station is currently being proposed in Taulov to serve as a "Park & Ride"-station for the region when faster train services will be implemented.

=== Haderslev ===
Haderslev is situated in a valley, leading from Vojens to Haderslev Fjord and the Baltic Sea. Haderslev was presumably founded by Vikings at least a century before it was granted status as royal borough in 1292. At that time, it had become one of the main trading centres in Southern Jutland. In 1327, Haderslevhus, the royal castle, was mentioned for the first time. It was situated east of the cathedral; an area still called Slotsgrunden. In the following centuries the city prospered, building both the Gothic Cathedral and the second castle of Hansborg (burnt in 1644), which was similar to Kronborg. Due to the plague in Copenhagen, King Christian IV was married there. In the 16th century, the city became one of the first Scandinavian places to embrace the Lutheran Reformation. Prior to the Second Schleswig War of 1864, Haderslev was situated in the Duchy of Schleswig, a Danish fief, so its history is properly included in the contentious history of Schleswig-Holstein. From 1864 it was part of Prussia, and as such part of the North German Confederation, and from 1871 onwards, part of the German Empire. In the 1920 Schleswig Plebiscite that returned Northern Schleswig to Denmark, 38.6% of Haderslev's inhabitants voted for remaining part of Germany and 61.4% voted for the cession to Denmark. It was formerly the capital of the German Kreis Hadersleben and the Danish Haderslev County.

=== Kolding ===
Kolding is a seaport located at the head of Kolding Fjord where the Battle of Kolding was fought on 25 December 1658. The allied Polish and Danish forces under hetman Stefan Czarniecki defeated the Swedish forces of Charles X Gustav of Sweden. A battle between German and Danish forces took place near the town on 23 April 1849 during the First War of Schleswig. Of note in the city are Koldinghus, a royal castle built in 1248 that now houses a historical museum, and Saint Nicolai, Denmark’s oldest stone church (built in the 13th century).

Christiansfeld is a town within the Kolding municipality with a population of 2,898 (1 January 2013). It was founded in 1773 by the Moravian Church and named after the Danish King Christian VII. To encourage construction, King Christian VII promised a 10-year tax holiday for the city and paid 10% of the construction costs of new houses. In 1864, Christiansfeld and the rest of Schleswig was ceded to Prussia as a result of Denmark's defeat in the Second Schleswig War. It remained a part of Germany until 1920 when, as a part of a plebiscite called for by the Treaty of Versailles, Northern Schleswig voted to re-join Denmark. After reunification, the Moravian church lost some of the rights it had obtained as a part of the town's founding in the 18th century. For example, it no longer had the ability to choose the town's leadership, paving the way for the town's first Danish mayor who was not a member of the church in 1920.[3] The church also sold its schools at this time due to the declining membership of its congregation. From 1970 to 2007, the town was the administrative seat of Christiansfeld Municipality, but it lost this status and was placed in the Kolding Municipality as a part of the Municipal Reform of 2007 (Kommunalreformen 2007). The houses in the town of Christiansfeld are built from yellow brick and detailed with fine craftsmanship, giving the town a unique character and making is a popular tourist destination. In 2013, Christiansfeld applied to be added to the list of UNESCO World Cultural Heritage Sites.

=== Middelfart ===
The earliest record mentioning the settlement is in 1231 but from the Middle Ages until the end of the 19th century, Middelfart was famed for its local fishermen who were also whale hunters in winter. Whale blubber was used for lamps, but the coming of electricity made whale hunting uneconomical. In the 20th century, hunting was resumed during the two world wars and two memorial stones now stand where the hunters landed the whales and where blubber was prepared.

=== Vejen ===
The history of Vejen goes back to the beginning of industrial revolution and the arrival of the railroad in the mid 1800s. Vejen was originally a small agricultural village but with the addition of the railroad, industries grew and Vejen grew into a city. Today Vejen is the main city in the municipality of Vejen. Other towns are Rødding, Holsted and Brørup.

=== Vejle ===
The city of Vejle began as a seaport at the head of the Vejle Fjord with manufacturing in textiles, iron, hardware, canned goods, and leather goods. Of note in Vejle is St. Nicholas Church (13th century, restored).

Jelling is a village within Vejle municipality famous for the Jelling stones, the Jelling stone ship and two large burial mounds. In the North Mound, built between 958 and 959 CE (possibly for King Gorm the Old of Denmark), an empty burial chamber was found. The South Mound was built around 970 and contains no burial. Beneath the two mounds is a large stone ship from around the end of the 9th century. Between the two mounds stand two rune stones, the Jelling stones. Near the stones, Gorm's son King Harald Bluetooth, the man who brought Christianity to Denmark, built a wooden church (965). Beneath it, he re-interred the remains of his father (965–966). The Jelling stones and Jelling Church have been an UNESCO World Heritage Site since 1994. Bluetooth communications was named after Harald Bluetooth as he was known for his unification of previously warring tribes from Denmark (including Scania, present-day Sweden, where the technology was invented), and Norway. Bluetooth technology likewise was intended to unify different communications systems, such as computers and mobile phones.

== Geography ==
=== Location ===
The Triangle Region is situated in the southern-central part of Denmark, and is a sub-area of the Region of Southern Denmark. The Region of Southern Denmark includes the southern part of the Jutland peninsula, bordering Germany, and the Island of Funen. The Triangle Region is located at the western tip of the Island of Funen and the eastern shore of the Jutland peninsula, where the Little Belt Strait is at its most narrow. Due to its location, The Triangle Region is a major transport hub as more or less all north-south and east-west motorway and rail traffic passes through The Triangle Region. The region is characterised by both large towns and rural areas with intensive agriculture. The region is also characterised with a large number of energy companies and is a hub for energy infrastructure.

=== Climate ===
Yearly precipitation is over 900 mm in some parts of The Triangle Region and rain is more or less even distributed through the year. The climate in Denmark is pleasant in the summertime (May - August) and the days are long and light, until 22.00-22.30 in June. Typical daytime temperatures in the midsummer are a little more than 20 degrees C, the sun is strong and skies can be clear. Winter in Denmark tends to be cold, with temperatures averaging at zero degrees Celsius and days that are dark and short between October and March.

== Attractions ==
=== Beaches and Parks ===
The Triangle Region’s coastline is sprinkled with numerous fine sandy beaches where the water is shallow and the sea is calm. The fjords and the Little Belt also provide plentiful sheltered beaches, great for swimming.

Vejle Deer Park was established in 1948 and across 23 acres of land above the Vejle Fjord. There are 2 different deer species in the park with approximately 50 fallow deer and 10 sika deer. The park is located in the north of Vejle in the woodland "Nørreskoven", it is free of charge and it is open all year round.

=== Museums and Historical Attractions ===
Trapholt Museum in Kolding (just above Kolding Fjord) has a collection of modern art and also contains Denmark's largest collection of chairs from the 20th Century, and the famous Danish architect Arne Jacobsen's unique holiday house (www.trapholt.dk).

Koldinghus in Kolding is where the Danish King built a fortress in 1268 to guard the border between the Kingdom of Denmark and the Duchy of Schleswig. The earliest parts still standing date from the 15th century. The newly restored wings of the castle have now also become international attractions in themselves (www.koldinghus.dk).

The Moravian Church in Christiansfeld is a popular tourist destination and was nominated as a tentative UNESCO World Heritage Site in 1993.

Vejle Museum of Art (Danish: Vejle Kunstmuseum www.vejlekunstmuseum.dk) in Vejle has Danish paintings and sculptures on display and is home to a collection of Golden Age paintings from the Vejle area as well as a collection of drawings by Rembrandt.

Jelling in Vejle municipality is famous for the Jelling stones - a large stone ship and two large burial mounds. In the North Mound, built between 958 and 959 CE (possibly for King Gorm of Denmark), an empty burial chamber was found. Beneath the mounds is a large stone ship from the end of the 9th century. Between the two mounds stand two rune stones, the Jelling stones. Gorm's son King Harald “Bluetooth” I of Denmark built a wooden church (965) on the site and beneath it re-interred (965–966) the remains of his father. The Jelling stones and Jelling Church have been an UNESCO World Heritage Site since 1994.

=== Entertainment and the Performing Arts ===
The Triangle Region's annual Kulturligt Festival combines theatre, music, food, drink, craft, lectures and cultural excursions.

Fredericia Theatre is famed for its musicals and developing new works as well as hosting more than 100 events annually, ranging from opera to stand-up and concerts (www.fredericiateater.dk).

=== Amusement Parks ===
LEGOLAND in Billund, is the oldest of the LEGO themed chain of amusement parks worldwide. It is divided into ten different worlds: Duplo Land, Imagination Zone, LEGOREDO Town, Adventure Land, Mini Land, Pirate Land, LEGO City, Knights’ Kingdom, Viking Land, and Polar Land. The park opened in 1968 and has 1.6 million visitors annually, making it the largest tourist attraction in Denmark outside Copenhagen.

== Education ==
The International School of Billund. The LEGO Foundation set up the International School of Billund in August 2013 to cater for students aged 3 to 9 years with children up to 16 invited to join from 2015. The school follows the International Baccalaureate curriculum.

The Gymnasium of Kolding also offers the International Baccalaureate programme with teaching in English. In Denmark, the International Baccalaureate is recognised as an equivalent to the Danish Upper Secondary School Diplomaz.

The University of Southern Denmark in Kolding focuses on design oriented research and education plus collaboration with the local business community and public institutions.

== Transport ==
The Triangle Region area has a well-established transportation infrastructure making it a hub for most of Denmark, as a Connection between North, South, East and West, and Germany and the rest of Scandinavia.

The 'Taulov Transport Center' was in 2014 designated as a 'Core Rail Road Terminal' by the European Union as the only Transport Center in Denmark.

=== Public Transportation ===
The Triangle Region has an extensive and efficient public transport system that the government encourages the public to use on a regular basis. In fact, many bus and train services correspond so that travel time is kept to minimum and passengers are not left waiting around. Rejseplanen.dk is Denmark’s Journey Planner, providing up to date information on routes, journey times and costs.

=== Airports ===
Billund Airport serves as Denmark’s second biggest airport offering international flights to 40 destinations. Set up by the LEGO family in the 1960s, it is now run independently though its proximity to LEGOLAND makes the airport popular during the summer months with many major airlines operating a service. For the majority of the passengers in western Denmark, this is their main airport for international travel.
