= Margrethe Christiansen =

Danish folk high school teacher

Margrethe Sofie Charlotte Christiansen née Appel (1895–1971) was an influential Danish folk high school teacher who, together with her husband Carl Peder Ostenfeld Christiansen, taught for many years at Askov Højskole. In 1934, she and her husband were appointed leaders of Frederiksborg Højskole where she increasingly took over responsibilities for leadership until her husband's death in 1951. She later spent periods at Bordings Friskole and Snoghøj Højskolen. Active as a public speaker and writer, she is remembered for her biographies of her schoolteacher parents.

== Biography ==
Born on 20 August 1895 in Askov, Vejen Municipality, in the south of Jutland, Margrethe Sofie Charlotte Appel was the daughter of Jacob Christian Lindberg Appel (1866–-1931), a folk high school headmaster and later a minister, and Ingeborg Schrøder (1868–1948), an early female gymnastics teacher.

Brought up at Askøv School, she decided at an early age that like her mother, she wanted to become a folk high school teacher. She took the preparatory examination in 1912 after which she continued her education at Askøv and at Sörängen Folkhögskola in Sweden. She spent the winter months in Copenhagen, living with her father who was now Church Minister. She received singing and music lessons and learnt German on the side. Later, in 1919, while in Copenhagen she obtained professional teaching qualifications in Danish and in German, complemented by a study trip to Germany.

On 28 December 1919, she married Carl Peder Ostenfeld Christiansen (1887–1951), a history teacher at Askov School. She was employed there as a teacher specializing in Danish while, together with her husband, she cared for one of the school's boarding houses. She also taught handicrafts and became a co-founder of Højskolernes Håndarbejde, a folk high school handicrafts association.

Margrethe Christiansen became an outstanding teacher, developing a deep commitment to Askov School. It must therefore have been difficult for her to accept her father's decision in 1928 to invite another couple, Karen and Jens Therkelsen Arnfred, to run the school following his retirement. She and her husband nevertheless continued to teach at Askov until 1934 when they accepted an offer to head Frederiksborg Højskole. Under their leadership, the school, known from 1937 Grundtvigs Højskole or Grundtvig's Folk High School, became recognized as a large and successful establishment. Margrethe took care of the school's boarding facilities and its administration while continuing to teach Danish literature. From 1934, she took a special interest in the girls who had been newly admitted to the school, instructing them in the responsibilities of women and encouraging them to appreciate music. After her husband suffered a heart attack in 1936, she had to take on ever more responsibilities.

After her husband died in 1951, Christiansen taught at Bordings Friskole and then at Snoghøj Højskole before heading a folk high school in Oldenburg for a period. In parallel, she wrote biographies of her mother and father, published as Ingeborg Appel og Askov (1967) and Jacob Appel — en mand og hans arv (1970). In 1961, she was honoured as a Knight of the Dannebrog.

Margrethe Christiansen died in Gentofte on 1 May 1971.
