= 2021 Fredericia municipal election =

- 16 November 2021

All 21 seats to the Fredericia Municipal Council 11 seats needed for a majority
- Turnout: 26,693 (64.6%) ▼6.0pp
	First party	Second party	Third party
	A	V	C
Party	Social Democrats	Venstre	Conservatives
Last election	13 seats, 54.3%	4 seats, 18.2%	0 seats, 2.4%
Seats won	9	5	2
Seat change	▼4	▲1	▲2
Popular vote	9,706	5,718	2514
Percentage	37.3%	22.0%	9.7%
Swing	▼17.0%	▲3.8%	▲7.3%
	Fourth party	Fifth party	Sixth party
	O	Ø	D
Party	Danish People's Party	Red–Green Alliance	New Right
Last election	3 seats, 12.2%	1 seat, 4.0%	0 seats, 0.8%
Seats won	2	1	1
Seat change	▼1	0	▲1
Popular vote	1,994	1,828	1,570
Percentage	7.7%	7%	6.0%
Swing	▼4.5%	▲3%	▲5.2%
	Seventh party
	F
Party	Green Left
Last election	0 seats, 3.5%
Seats won	1
Seat change	▲1
Popular vote	1,123
Percentage	4.3%
Swing	▲0.8%
Mayor before election
Steen Wrist (Note: Jacob Bjerregaard was elected in 2017, but stepped down in 2020)
Social Democrats
Mayor after election
Steen Wrist
Social Democrats

In the 2017 Fredericia municipal election, the Social Democrats won comfortably with 54.3% of the vote, and 13 of the 21 seats (61.9%). However, Jacob Bjerregaard, who became mayor following the result in 2017, stepped down as mayor in December 2020. Tabloid newspaper Ekstra Bladet, speculated that some of the scandals that had occurred throughout his mayor period, may have been a factor in this decision. Due to the dramatic period, it was speculated that the Social Democrats might lose the mayor position following this election.

On election night it became clear that the Social Democrats had lost a lot of support. They decreased their vote share by 17%, and lost their absolute majority in the council. However, due the Red–Green Alliance keeping their one-seat, and the Green Left gaining a seat, a slim majority of 11 red bloc seats were won. As a result of this, Steen Wrist from the Social Democrats, who had taken over from Jacob Bjerregaard in 2020, would eventually end up continuing as mayor.

== Electoral system ==
For Danish municipal elections, between 9 and 31 council members are chosen depending on the municipality's size; for instance, the Fredericia Municipality had 21 seats in 2021. Seats are allocated using the D'Hondt method under a closed list proportional representation system. Unlike in Danish General Elections, municipal council elections permit electoral alliances.

== Electoral alliances ==
=== Electoral Alliance 1 ===
Party		Political alignment
A	Social Democrats	Centre-left
B	Social Liberals	Centre to Centre-left

=== Electoral Alliance 2 ===
Party		Political alignment
C	Conservatives	Centre-right
D	New Right	Right-wing to Far-right
K	Christian Democrats	Centre to Centre-right
O	Danish People's Party	Right-wing to Far-right
V	Venstre	Centre-right

=== Electoral Alliance 3 ===
Party		Political alignment
F	Green Left	Centre-left to Left-wing
Ø	Red–Green Alliance	Left-wing to Far-Left
Å	The Alternative	Centre-left to Left-wing

== Results by polling station ==
P = Frie Danske
Y = Borgeligt Fællesskab

Division	A	B	C	D	F	I	K	O	P	V	Y	Æ	Ø	Å
Division	%	%	%	%	%	%	%	%	%	%	%	%	%	%
Gymnasiet	40.3	1.6	7.9	6.2	4.9	0.5	0.4	6.7	0.1	18.9	1.1	0.2	9.3	2.0
Bredstrup-Pjedsted	34.2	1.2	8.8	7.2	3.5	0.5	0.8	6.6	0.1	29.7	0.8	0.5	5.0	1.1
Erritsø	33.1	2.7	12.5	5.3	3.5	0.3	0.2	8.4	0.0	25.4	2.3	0.1	5.2	0.8
Herslev	25.6	0.8	9.0	12.0	2.8	1.5	0.5	11.8	0.0	27.1	2.5	0.3	5.5	0.8
Indre By	37.8	1.7	9.5	6.0	5.1	0.9	0.0	7.2	0.3	18.5	1.2	0.3	10.0	1.5
Bøgeskov	32.6	2.0	13.9	6.6	4.0	0.1	0.4	6.9	0.1	25.9	1.2	0.3	5.6	0.3
Søndermarken	44.5	1.3	6.8	5.4	3.9	0.3	0.3	8.7	0.1	19.3	1.6	0.2	6.7	0.8
Taulov	29.9	5.2	12.2	6.8	4.9	0.6	0.5	7.5	0.0	26.6	1.2	0.2	3.8	0.9

== Results ==
Party		Votes	%	+/-	Seats	+/-
Fredericia Municipality
A	Social Democrats	9,706	37.33	-16.95	9	-4
V	Venstre	5,718	21.99	+3.80	5	+1
C	Conservatives	2,514	9.67	+7.27	2	+2
O	Danish People's Party	1,994	7.67	-4.54	2	-1
Ø	Red-Green Alliance	1,828	7.03	+3.07	1	0
D	New Right	1,570	6.04	+5.21	1	+1
F	Green Left	1,123	4.32	+0.84	1	+1
B	Social Liberals	566	2.18	+0.96	0	0
Y	Borgerligt Fællesskab	393	1.51	New	0	New
Å	The Alternative	304	1.17	-0.21	0	0
I	Liberal Alliance	123	0.47	-0.97	0	0
K	Christian Democrats	90	0.35	+0.04	0	0
Æ	Freedom List	52	0.20	New	0	New
P	Frie Danske	21	0.08	New	0	New
Total		26,002	100	N/A	21	N/A
Invalid votes		135	0.33	+0.26		
Blank votes		556	1.35	+0.94		
Turnout		26,693	64.60	-6.03		
Source: valg.dk
