= Winnie Liljeborg =

Winnie Liljeborg (formerly Winnie Dahl and Winnie Enevoldsen) is a Danish businesswoman, investor and philanthropist. She was one of the founders of Pandora and is now one of the wealthiest women in Denmark with a net worth of DKK 4.9 billion.

== Career ==
Winnie Liljeborg founded Pandora in collaboration with her partner and later husband Per Enevoldsen in 1979. The private equity fund Axcel purchased 60% of the company in 2006.

== Philanthropy ==
In 2014, she purchased the property Haraldsborg in Roskilde and has subsequently been converting it into a Christmas seal home (julemærkehjem) and school for children with weight issues. She has also supported Mødrehjælpen.

== Personal life ==
Winnie Liljeborg and Per Enevoldsen have one son, Christian. They divorced after their silver wedding anniversary in 2008. Liljeborg lives on Strandvejen in Roskilde. In September 2017, Berlingske Business estimated her net worth at DKK 4.9 billions.
