= Haraldsborg =

Historic property in Roskilde, Denmark

Coordinates: 55°39′15″N 12°05′19″E

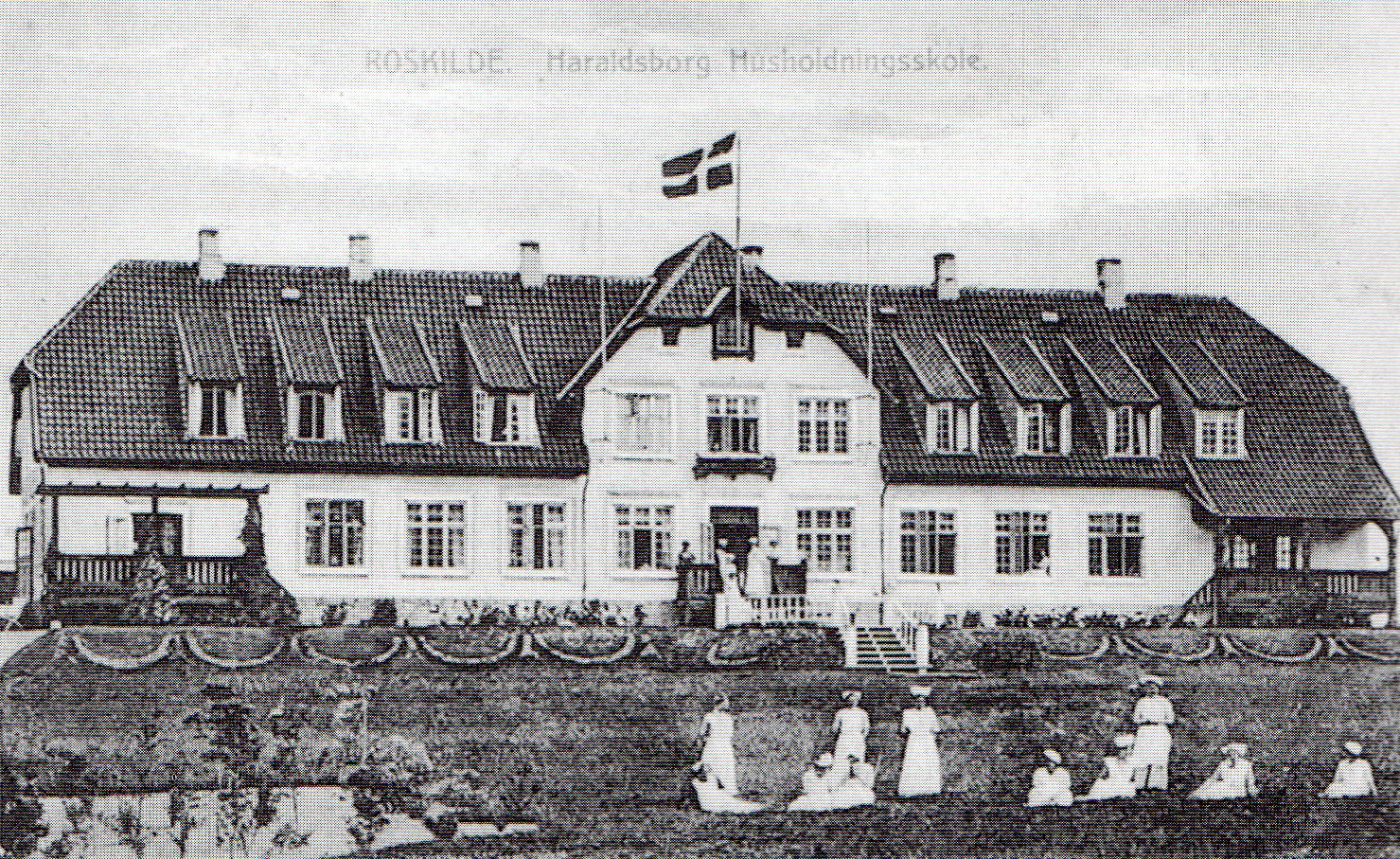
Haraldsborg Husholdningsskole, c. 1910

Haraldsborg is a historic property located close to Roskilde Fjord in northeastern Roskilde, Denmark. As of 2017, it is being converted into a Christmas seal home for socially challenged children.

== History ==
=== Harald's fortress ===
According to Saxo Grammaticus, Haraldsborg was built by Harald Kesja. It was most likely a ring fortification with palisades. Saxo mentions a revolving wooden tower, but such structures are not known from archeological excavations. Harald Kesja plundered far and wide, which greatly contributed to his not being elected king after his father died in 1103. Instead, his uncle Niels of Denmark was elected king in 1104. In 1133, Haraldsborg came under siege by Harald's half-brother Eric Emune and fell after local German craftsmen from Roskilde had assisted Eric in the construction of a trebuchet. Haraldsborg was part of Queen Dorothea's dower lands.

Hendrik Behrmann claims that the last remains of Haraldsborg were destroyed by German soldiers during the Count's Feud in 1534.

=== The watermill ===
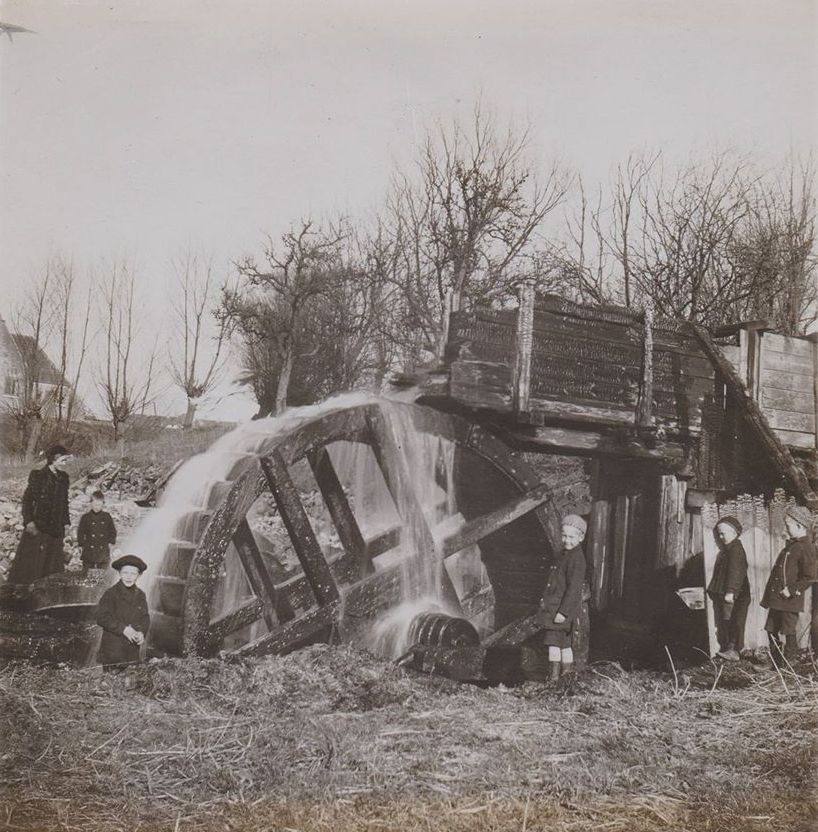
Haraldsborg Watermill photographed by Kristian Hude after the fire in 1909

A watermill is first mentioned at the site in 1295, when Erik Menved granted it to St. Agnes' Priory in Roskilde. It later came into the procession of Duebrødre Kloster. The watermill is also seen on the oldest maps of Roskilde. In 1677, Rosen refers to it as Den Haralds Mølle ("The Harald's Mill"), while it is referred to as Haraldsborg Mølle in 1753. The watermill and the associated four-winged farm building were destroyed in a fire in 1909.

=== Haraldsborg Husholdningsskole ===
In 1910, Haraldsborg was converted into a training facility for aspiring housewives (husholdningsskole). Haraldsborg Husholdningsskole was led by Anna Bransager Nielsen and had after a few years grown to be one of the largest of its kind in Denmark. It closed in 1954. Roskilde Municipality purchased the building in 1957 and converted it into a senior citizens' home. It was later converted into a home for psychiatric patients and has more recently housed asylum seekers.

Haraldsborg was purchased by Winnie Liljeborg in 2014 and is now under conversion into the fifth Danish Christmas seal home.

== Haraldsborg Hoard ==
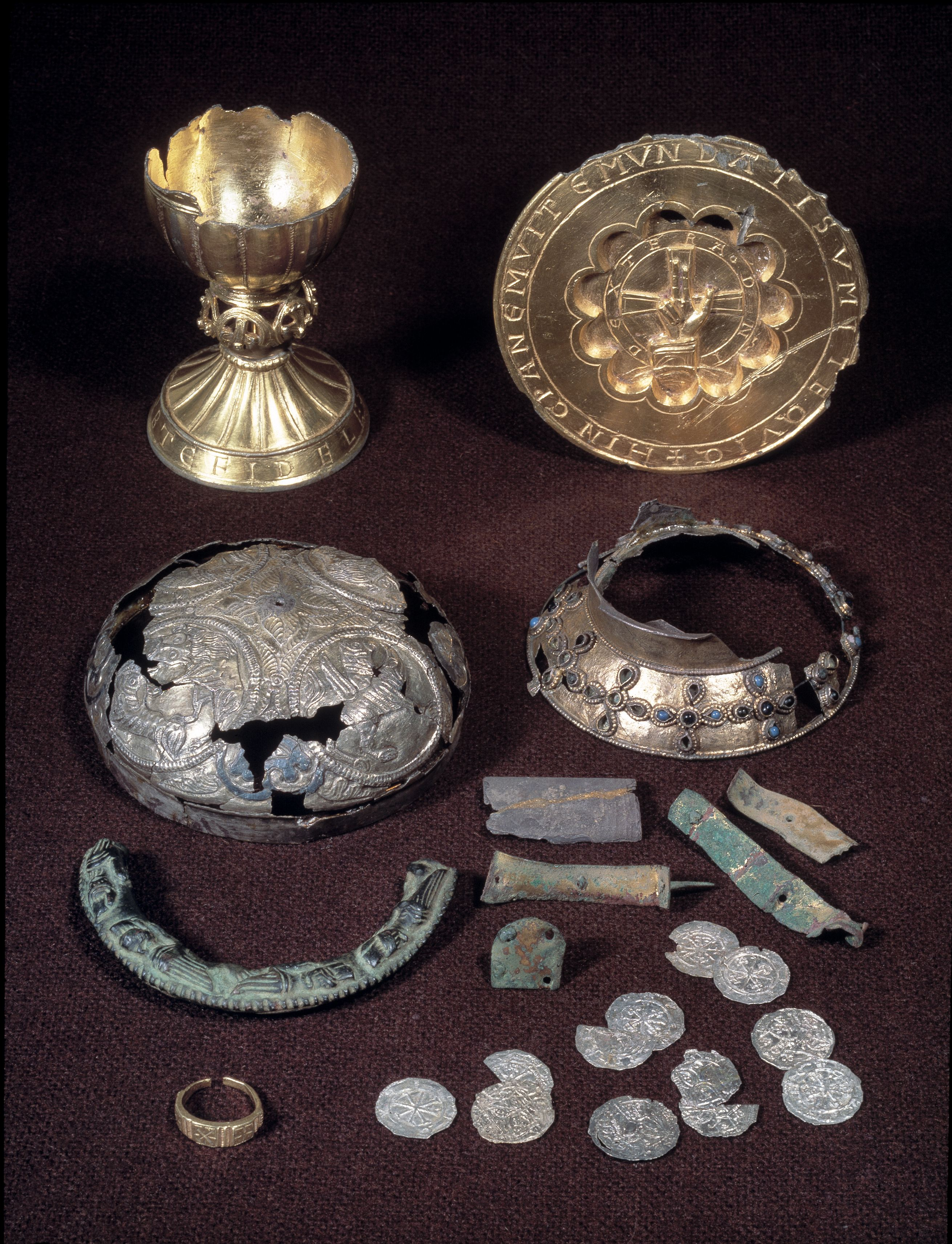
Haraldsborg Hoard

The so-called Haraldsborg Hoard was found on the site in the 19th century. The artefacts comprise the oldest known altar set in Denmark, consisting of a gilded bronze chalice and am altar disc as well as the lit of an oriental bowl. It also comprises more than 600 coins dating from Erik Emune's reign.
