= HMS Little Belt =

Two ships of the Royal Navy have borne the name HMS Little Belt. The name was a translation from the original name of the first ship, a captured Danish prize. The Danish name is that of the strait that separates Funen from the Danish mainland and that links the Kattegat to the Baltic Sea.

- HMS Little Belt (1807) was a 20-gun sixth rate, formerly the Danish ship Lillebælt. She was captured at the Battle of Copenhagen in 1807. She was involved in a battle with the American USS President in 1811, and was sold later that year.
- HMS Little Belt (1812) was a 3-gun sloop, formerly the mercantile sloop Friends Good Will, which the British captured in July 1812 and the Americans captured in 1813, but which grounded in October 1813 and was burnt by a British expeditionary force in December.
