= Snoghøj =

- Fredericia
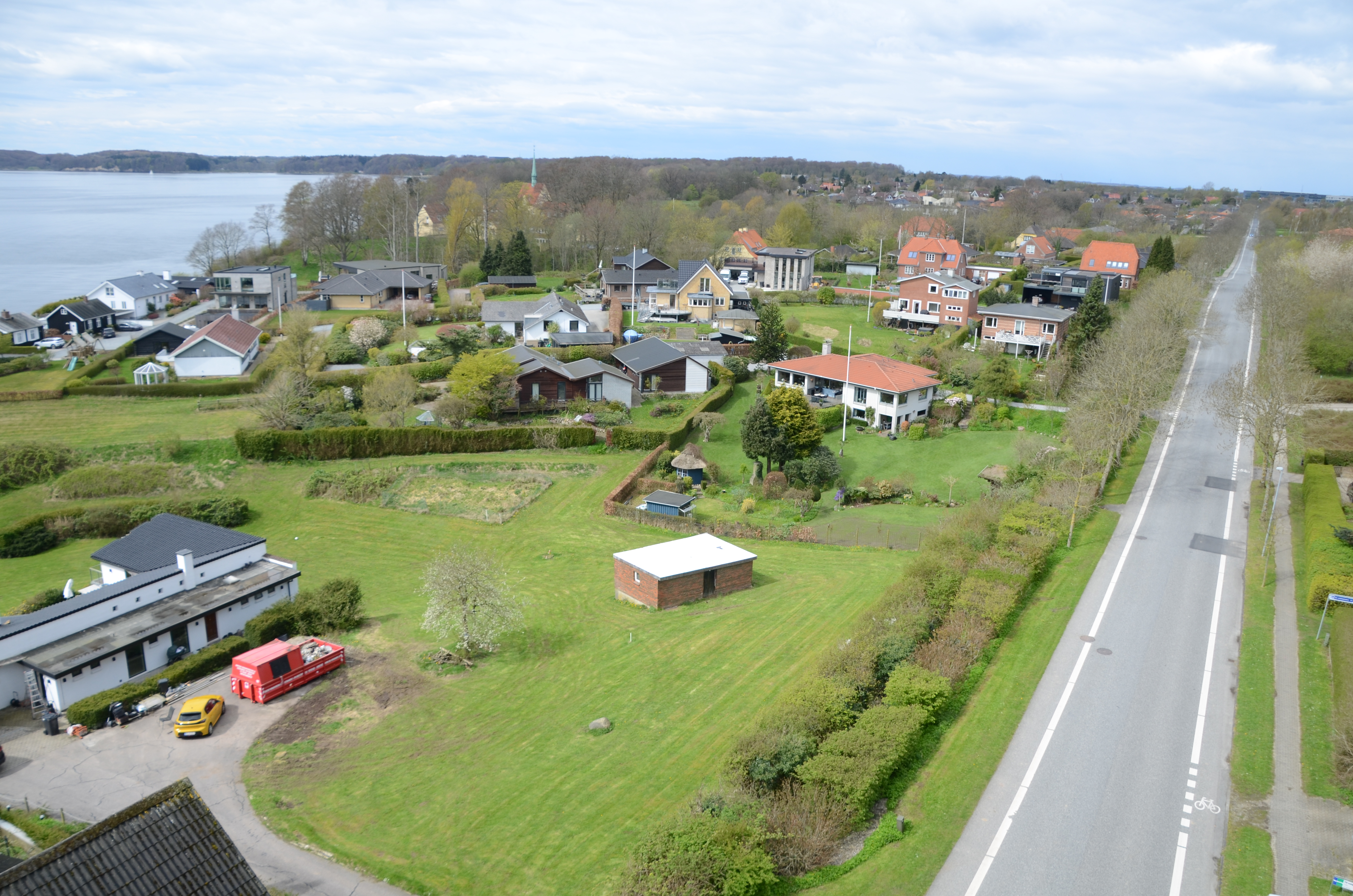
- View from the Little Belt Bridge

- Location within Denmark
- Coordinates: 55°31′25″N 9°43′05″E
- Country: Denmark
- Region: Southern Denmark (Syddanmark)
- Municipality: Fredericia

Snoghøj is a district of Fredericia, Denmark, between Erritsø and Middelfart that developed because of the Højskole (folk high school) that was built there. The district has a population of nearly 3,000 people, and an average of 16 snow days and 97 rain days per year. The average temperature is 2 degrees Celsius in the winter, and 14 degrees Celsius in the summer.

From Snoghøj, the 1,178-metre long Little Belt Bridge connects Jutland with Funen over the Little Belt strait.

== History ==
In January 1644, Snoghøj was besieged and captured by Swedish forces during the Torstenson War.

== Works cited ==
- Englund, Peter (1993). Ofredsår: om den Svenska Stormaktstiden och en man i dess mitt [Years of unrest: about the Swedish Empire and a man in its midst] (in Swedish). Stockholm: Atlantis. ISBN 9789174863499.
