= Skærbæk, Fredericia Municipality =

Skærbæk
- Town
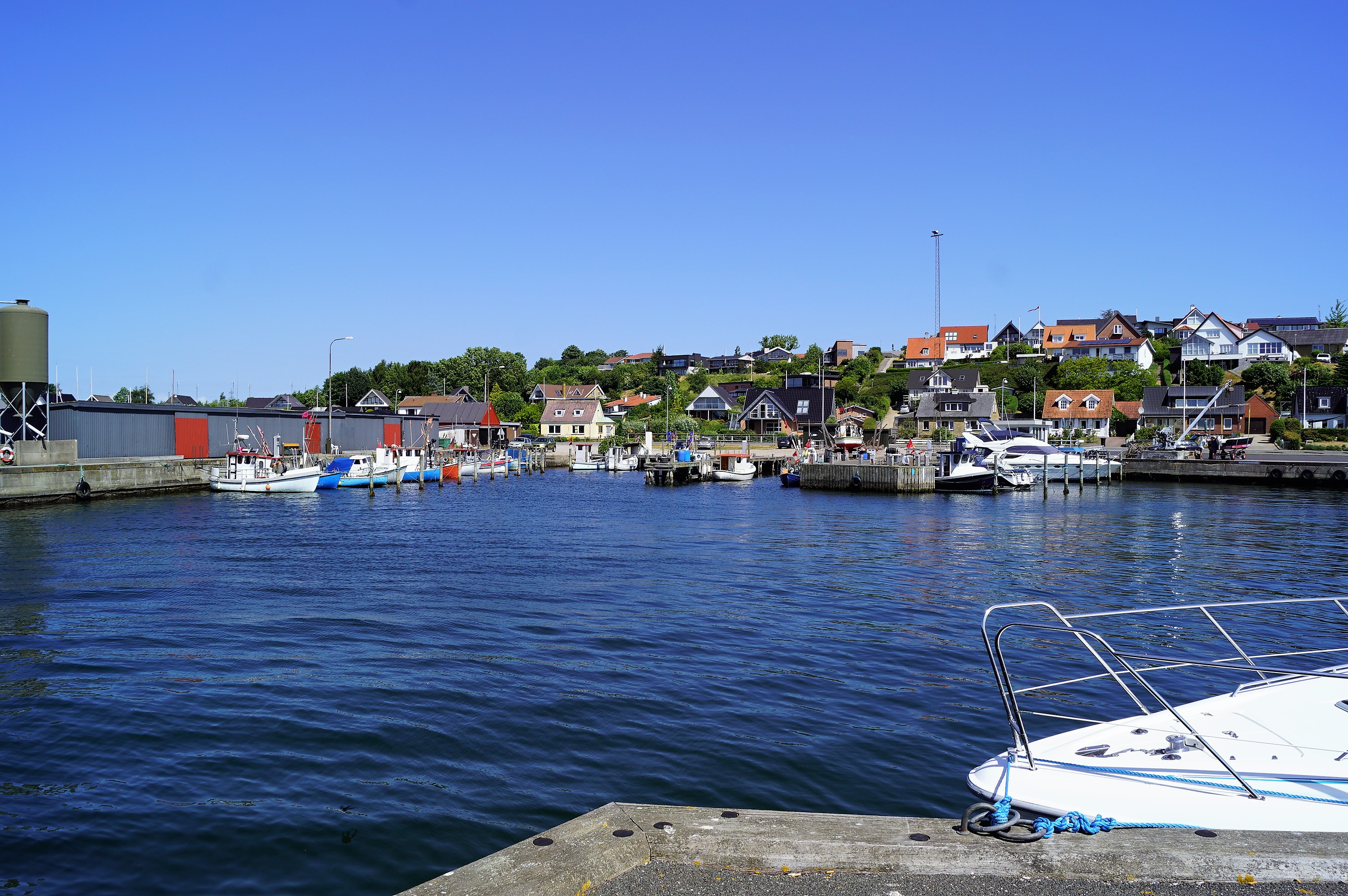
- Skærbæk harbour

- Location in Denmark Skærbæk (Region of Southern Denmark)
- Coordinates: 55°31′N 9°38′E
- Country: Denmark
- Region: Southern Denmark
- Municipality: Fredericia Municipality

Area
  - Urban: 2.2 km^{2} (0.85 sq mi)

Population (2026)
  - Urban: 2,645
  - Urban density: 1,200/km^{2} (3,100/sq mi)
- Time zone: UTC+1 (CET)
  - Summer (DST): UTC+2 (CEST)
- Postal code: DK-7000 Fredericia

Skærbæk is a coastal town in Fredericia Municipality, Denmark, with a population of 2,645 (1 January 2026). It is situated on the northern shore of Kolding Fjord, 4 km south of the town of Taulov.

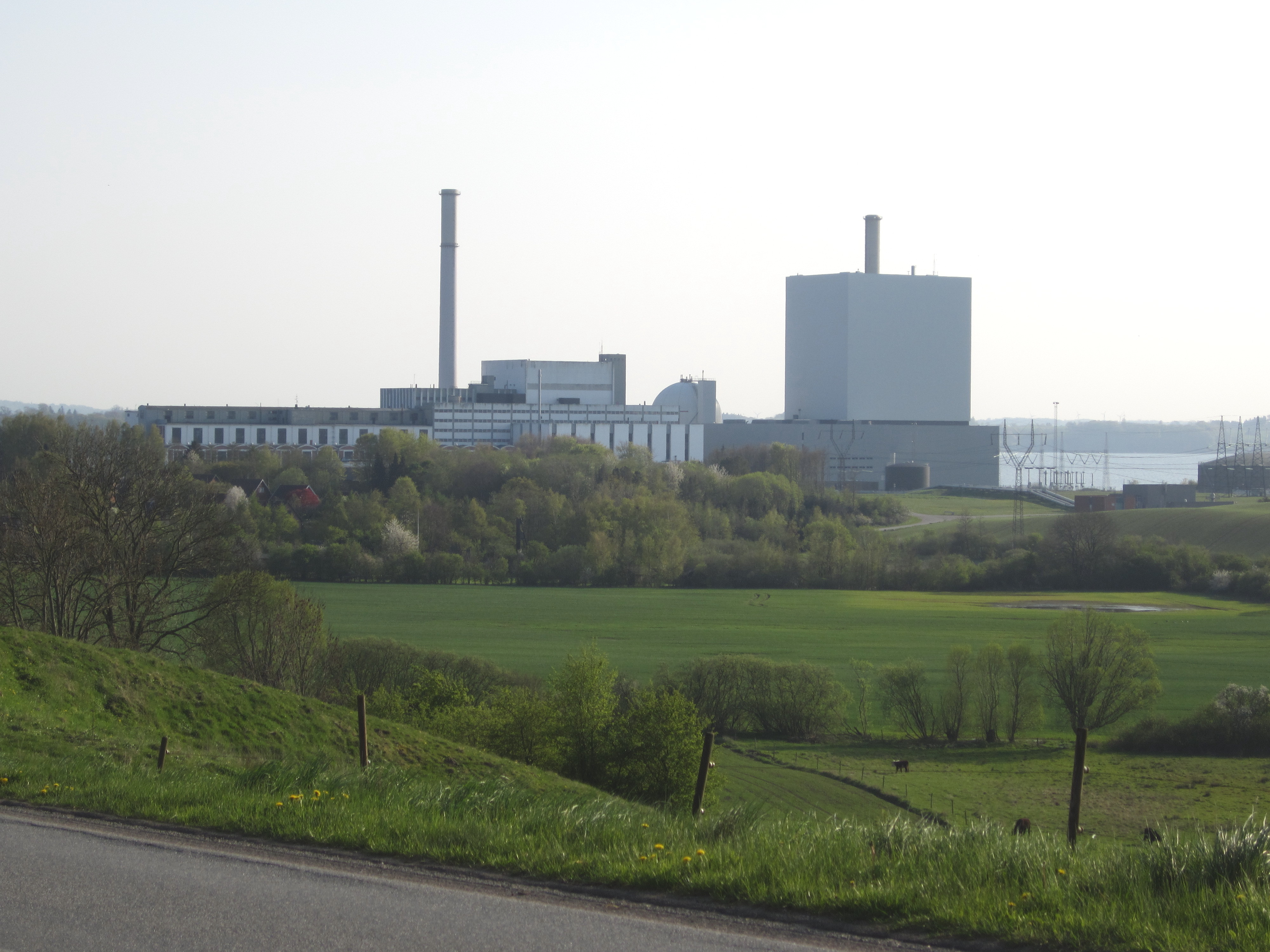
Skærbækværket Power Station

The Skærbækværket Power Station, owned and operated by Ørsted, is located just west of the town.
