= Stine Knudsen =

Danish handball player (born 1992)

Personal information
- Full name: Stine Knudsen
- Nationality: Danish
- Born: 27 April 1992 (age 34) Taulov, Denmark
- Height: 1.62 m (5 ft 4 in)

Sport
- Sport: Handball
- Position: Left wing
- Current club: København Håndbold
- Number: 10

Senior clubs
- Years: Team
- 2008-2010: Fredericia HK
- 2010-2011: Odense Håndbold
- 2011-2016: SønderjyskE Håndbold
- 2016-2018: København Håndbold
Medal record
European Youth Championship
Gold medal – first place	2009 Serbia

Stine Knudsen (born 27 April 1992) is a Danish retired handball player who, last played for København Håndbold, until 2018.
