= Little Belt =

Strait in Denmark linking the Baltic Sea to the Kattegat strait and the Atlantic Ocean

- Lillebælt
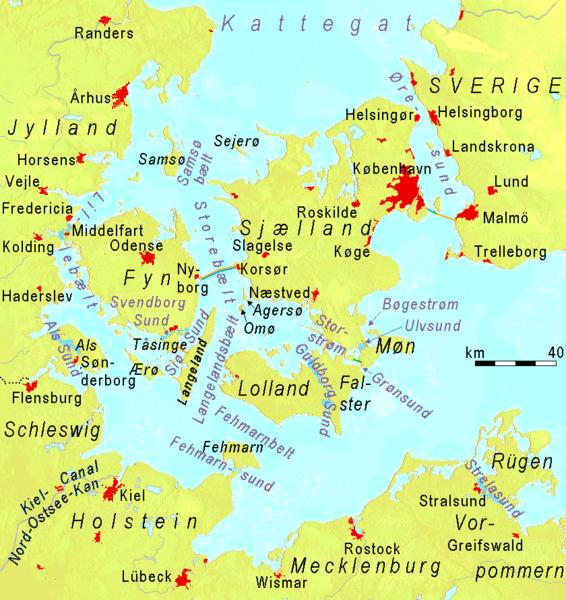
- The Little Belt (labelled with its Danish name Lillebælt), the leftmost of the 3 Danish Straits

- Location within Europe
- Coordinates: 55°11′N 9°50′E
- Type: strait
- Basin countries: Denmark
- Max. length: 50 km (31 mi)
- Max. width: 28 km (17 mi)
- Min. width: 800 m (2,625 ft)

Designations

Ramsar Wetland
- Official name: Lillebælt
- Designated: 2 September 1977
- Reference no.: 154

The Little Belt (Danish: Lillebælt, pronounced [ˈliləˌpelˀt]) is a strait between the island of Funen and the Jutland Peninsula in Denmark. It is one of the three Danish Straits that drain and connect the Baltic Sea to the Kattegat strait, which drains west to the North Sea and Atlantic Ocean.

== Geography ==
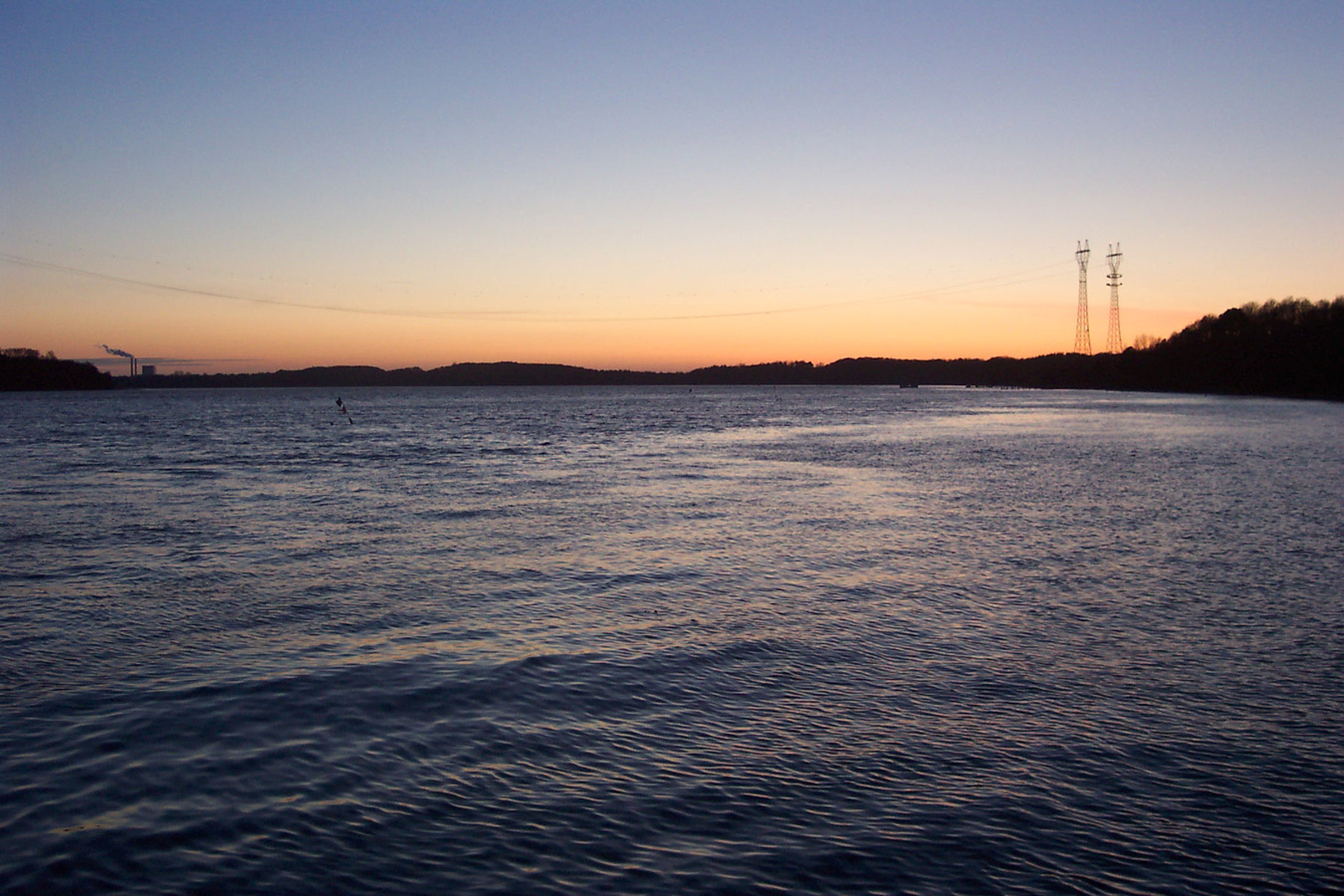
The Little Belt strait at dusk.

The Little Belt is about 50 km (31 mi) long and 800 m (2,600 ft) to 28 km (17 mi) wide, and its deepest point is at Marens Hul west of the island of Fænø, at 81 m (266 ft), which makes it deeper than its sister strait, the Great Belt. Numerous small Danish islands lie within the belt. In part because of its depth, 10% of the water moving between the inner Baltic Sea and the Kattegat flows through the Little Belt.

The Little Belt stretches from the town of Juelsminde in the north to the island of Als in the south, with a winding course in between. The northern end is the widest at over 15 km (9.3 mi). From there it runs southwest, narrowing to about 1 km (0.62 mi) at a place called Snævringen (The Narrows), where the two Little Belt Bridges are located. South of Fænø, the strait widens to about 10 km (6.2 mi) until it reaches the Baltic Sea near Als and the South Funen Archipelago.

The Little Belt's western coastline is largely broken up by irregular inlets called fjords, and both sides feature steep sand bluffs.

== Geology ==
The area around the Little Belt is shaped by numerous glacial moraines, the first of which was formed during the early Weichsel glaciation approximately 22-25,000 years ago. Approximately 14-15,000 years ago, during the late Weichsel glaciation, ice arrived from the south and southeast, one part of which became the Little Belt Glacier, causing hilly terrain with deep fjords. The notable tunnel valleys were formed by meltwater. The terminal moraines from the northeast ice's glacial maximum are some of the oldest in Denmark.

== Nature ==
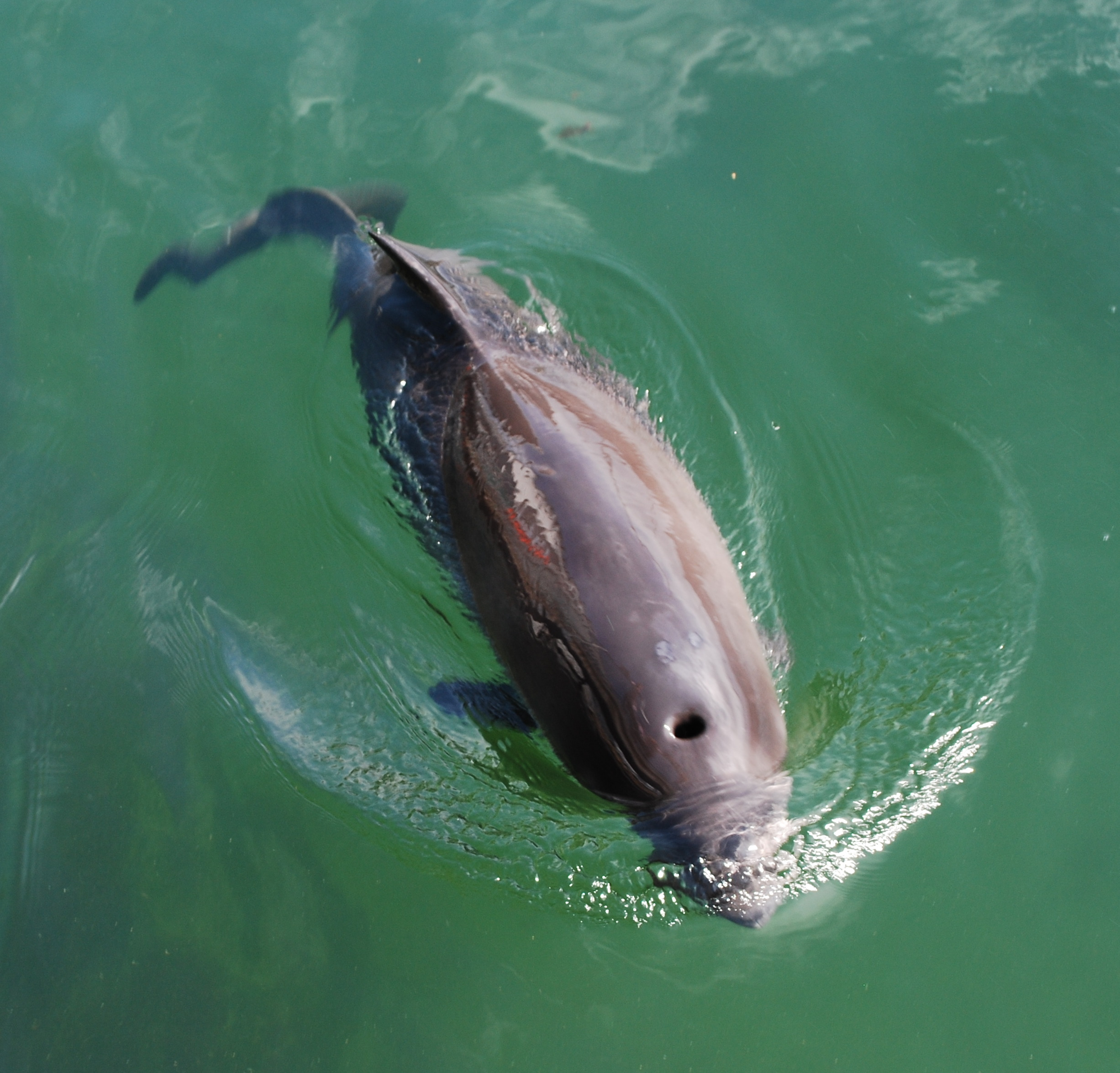
The harbour porpoise is common in the belt.

The Little Belt is a protected wetland under the Ramsar Convention and a particularly important spot for breeding and migrating birds. Protected species in the area include whooper swans, white-tailed eagles, western marsh harriers, spotted crakes, corn crakes, pied avocets, ruffs, short-eared owls, common terns, Arctic terns, little terns, greater scaups, common eiders, common goldeneyes, and red-breasted mergansers.

The Little Belt has the highest known density of harbour porpoises in the world, and is home to several thousand individuals. It is the only resident cetacean in the inner Danish waters. Observation tours are accessible nearby as well. Other species such as minke, humpback, and fin whales visit the waters rather sporadically. The deep waters attract many species of fish, including cod, herring, and sea trout, and the Little Belt is a destination for recreational fishing.

== History ==
=== Prehistoric settlements ===
Human populations lived around the Little Belt during the Stone Age, hunting aurochs, reindeer, and other game in the tunnel valleys and forests. Climate and geological changes brought new plants and animals to the area and made the fishery in the fjords and neighbouring archipelagoes into an important food source. Around 4000 BC, temperatures rose again, and the Funnelbeaker culture was active in the area. There are many archaeological sites from the Funnelbeaker culture and other Neolithic cultures in the area.

Throughout the Bronze Age, Iron Age, and Viking Age, trade with other populations increased, and settlements became larger and more permanent. In the 14th century, the towns of Kolding and Vejle received merchant town privileges, and today they are the area's two largest towns.

=== Porpoise hunting ===
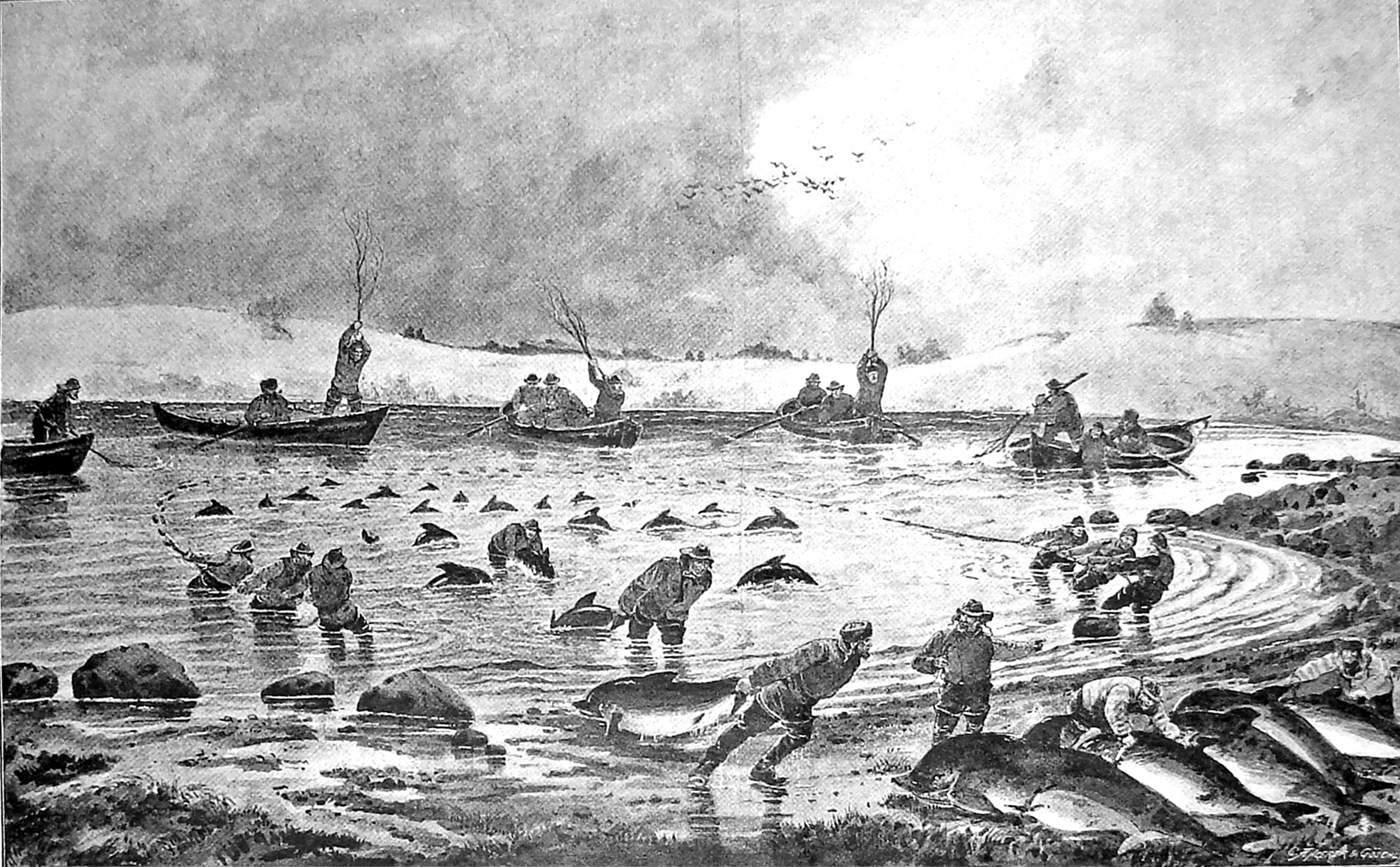
19th century harbour porpoise catch in Gamborg Fjord

From the Middle Ages until the end of the 19th century, local fishermen were also involved in harbour porpoise hunting. Harbor porpoises winter in Danish waterways, and fishermen would wait in the narrow parts of the belt and drive them to the shallows where they would be slaughtered. Porpoise oil, a type of whale oil, was in widespread use as a lamp oil until the spread of electric lighting undermined the porpoise hunting economy. In the winter of 1854-55, 1,742 porpoises were captured, but otherwise, the catch from most winters was around 700-800 porpoises. Porpoise hunting was regulated by laws dating to at least 1593. The law was overturned by a royal resolution on May 4, 1899, although shortages during World War I and II caused short-lived resurgences in porpoise hunting.

=== Modern era ===
In 1801 the Danish Navy launched a 22-gun warship named Lillebælt for the strait. After the 1807 Battle of Copenhagen she was surrendered to the British Royal Navy, where her name was anglicized to HMS Little Belt, and she took part in the then notorious Little Belt affair in North American waters. Later the Royal Navy bestowed the name "Little Belt" on another ship, which had no Danish antecedents.

19th century proponents of German unification advocated considering the Little Belt (German: Kleiner Belt) as the northern border of Germany, and the Belt is mentioned in this context in Ernst Mortiz Arndt's Was ist des Deutschen Vaterland? (1813) and the Deutschlandlied (1841), the third stanza of which is the current German national anthem. This reflects the fact that the Denmark-Germany border has shifted several times over the centuries, so that the current Danish region of Southern Jutland was once part of the Duchy of Schleswig.

The Little Belt has historically been an important shipping channel. In the present day, it is popular among divers for its archaeological sites and shipwrecks.

== Infrastructure ==
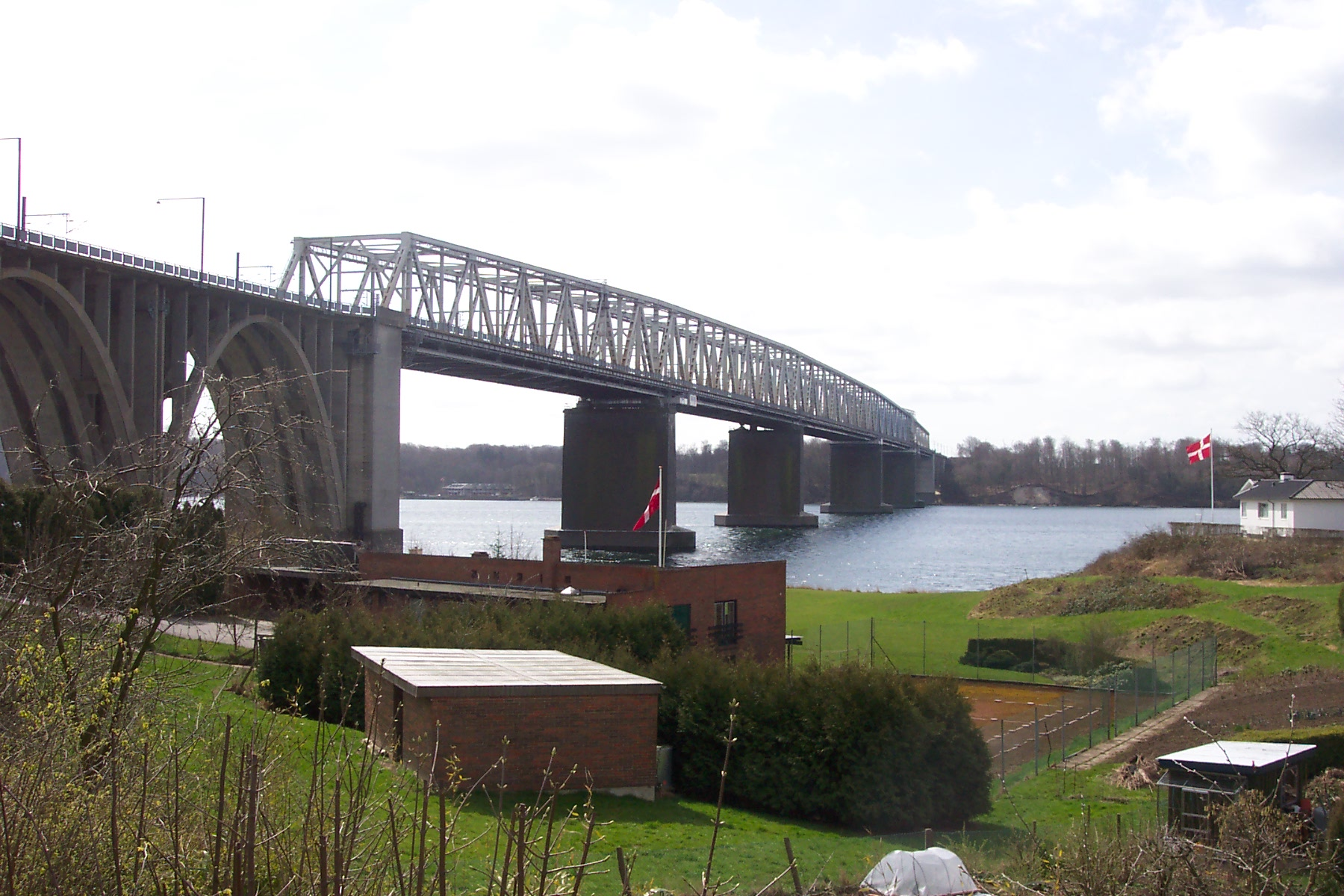
Old Little Belt Bridge (built 1935)

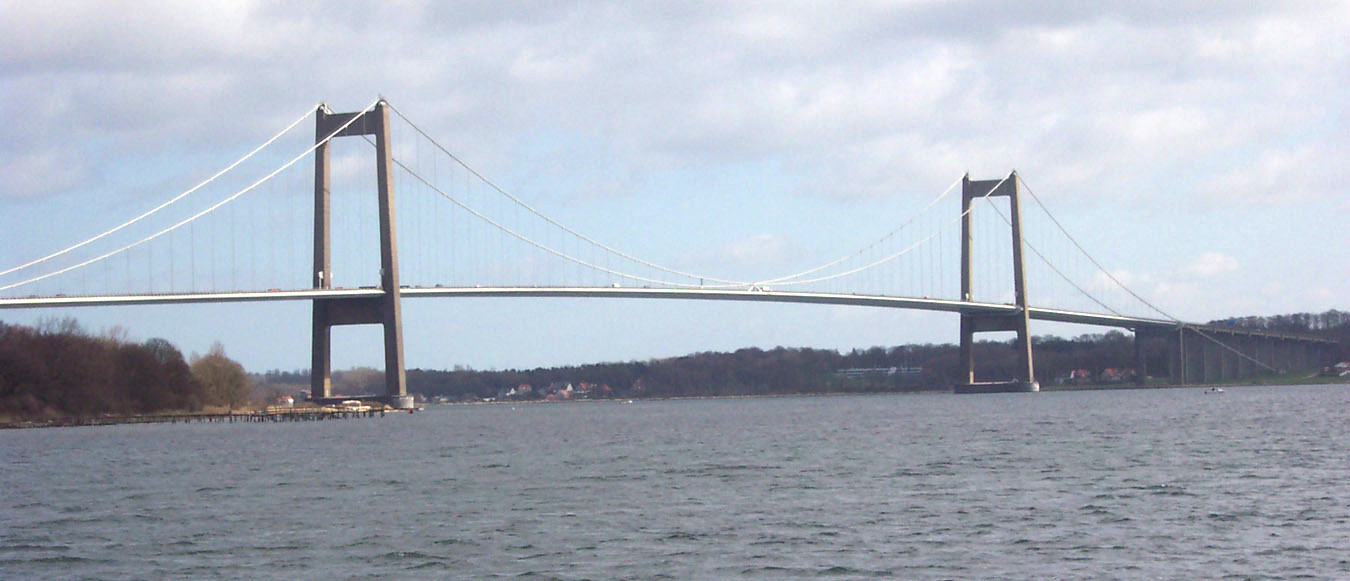
New Little Belt Bridge (built 1970)

Various ferry services have crossed the Little Belt over the years, including the Snoghøj-Middelfart ferry, followed by the Fredericia-Strib ferry, which became Denmark's first train ferry in 1872. Ferry crossings were replaced by the Old Little Belt Bridge in 1935 and the New Little Belt Bridge in 1970. Today, the old bridge carries local traffic and train lines, while the new bridge carries the E20 motorway.

Two power lines also previously crossed the Little Belt, the first of which was dismantled and replaced by an undersea cable in 2013.

== See also ==
- Danish Straits includes the Little Belt.
  - Great Belt strait
  - Øresund strait
