= Julemærkefonden =

Danish charity

- Formation: 1903
- Headquarters: Copenhagen, Denmark
- Chief Executive: Søren Ravn Jensen
- Website: julemaerket.dk

Julemærkefonden (lit. 'The Christmas Seal Foundation') is a Danish charity that operates four so-called Christmas seal homes for children with social challenges. It issues an annual Christmas seal to finance its activities.

== History ==
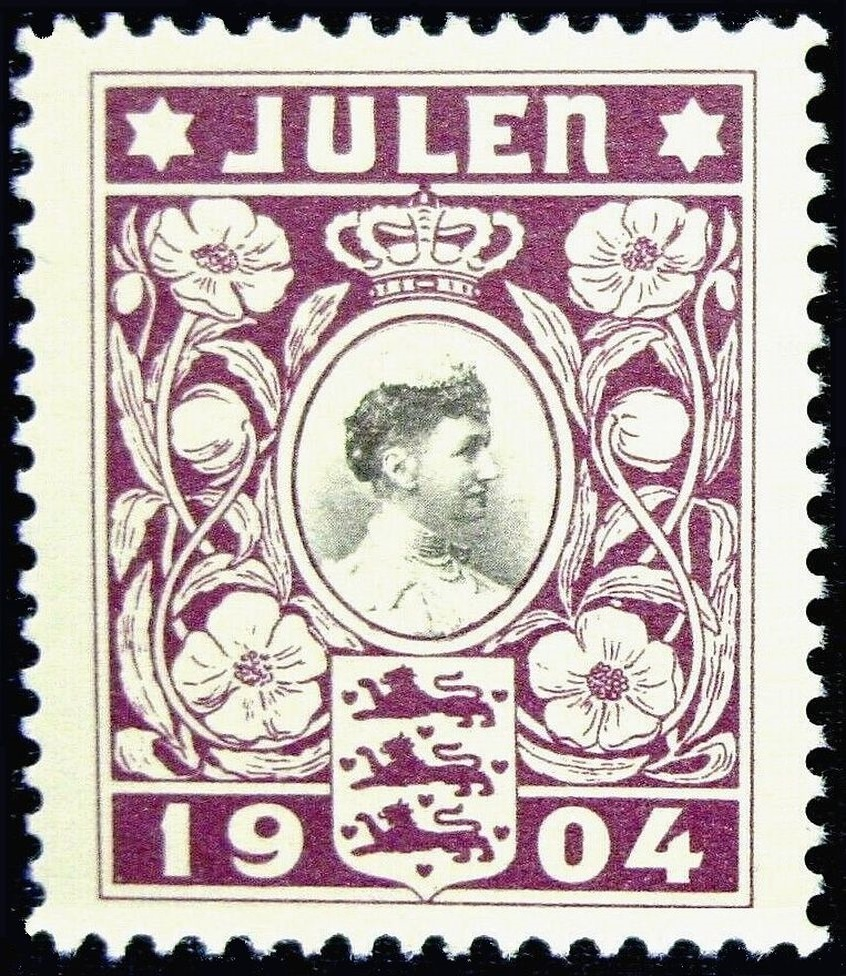
The Danish Christmas seal of 1904 features the Danish Queen Louise, the world's first Christmas seal

The Foundation traces its history back to 1903 when post office clerk and later post master Einar Holbøll conceived the idea for a Danish Christmas seal, the sale of which was to fund work among sick children. A Christmas Seal Committee was set up and the first Danish Christmas seal was issued in 1904. It was available at the cost of 2 øre and featured a portrait of Queen Louise. A tuberculosis sanatorium (now Hotel Koldingfjord) opened at Kolding in 1911. It was immediately passed on to Foreningen til Tuberkulosens Bekæmpelse.

The Christmas Seal Committee decided that funds should in the future be used for the establishment and operation of sanatoriums for children. The first two Christmas seal homes opened in 1912. They were located in two former orphanages in Juelsminde and Mørkøv. A third institution was built in Svendborg in 1913–14.

In 1928, the foundation was offered the Lindersvold estate at Faxe at a very low price. The former home of an editor named Jessens at Fjordmark near Flensborg Fjord was converted into a Christmas stamp home in 1938. It was followed by the inauguration of a purpose-built Christmas stamp home in Hobro in May 1939.

In 1948, the foundation purchased Villa Kildemose at Ølsted in North Zealand. It was converted into a Christmas seal home for small children. The Christmas seal home in Juelsminde was ceded to Den Kellerske Anstalt at Brejning in 1957.

A Christmas seal home opened at Skælskør in 1962. The committee then operated a total of seven institutions with room for 283 children.

Several of the Christmas seal homes were sold in the 1970s.
