= Hotel Koldingfjord =

Hotel and conference center in Denmark

Coordinates: 55°29′53.11″N 9°33′19.36″E

General information
- Opened: 1911

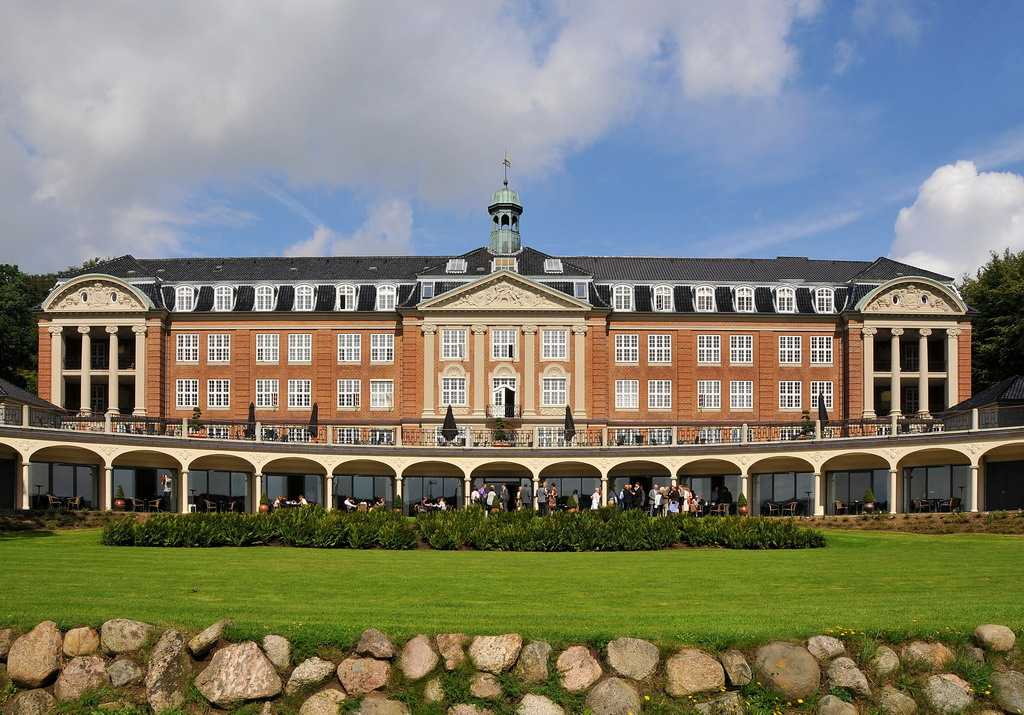
Hotel Koldingfjord

Hotel Koldingfjord is a hotel and conference centre located on the north side of Kolding Fjord near Kolding, Denmark.

== History ==
The hotel was originally the first of a series of sanatoriums built with money raised from the sale of Christmas seals. Construction began in 1906 and the facility opened in 1911. It was later expanded in 1933. By 1960, tuberculosis had been eliminated in Denmark and the buildings were converted into a home for mentally handicapped children. The institution was closed in 1983 and the buildings were left empty until 1987 when the property was sold to the construction firm Isleff. They renovated the buildings with the assistance of the architects Vilhelm Lauritzen and Jørgen Stærmose and the hotel opened in 1990.
