= Højskolen Snoghøj =

Coordinates: 55.5228°N 9.7092°E

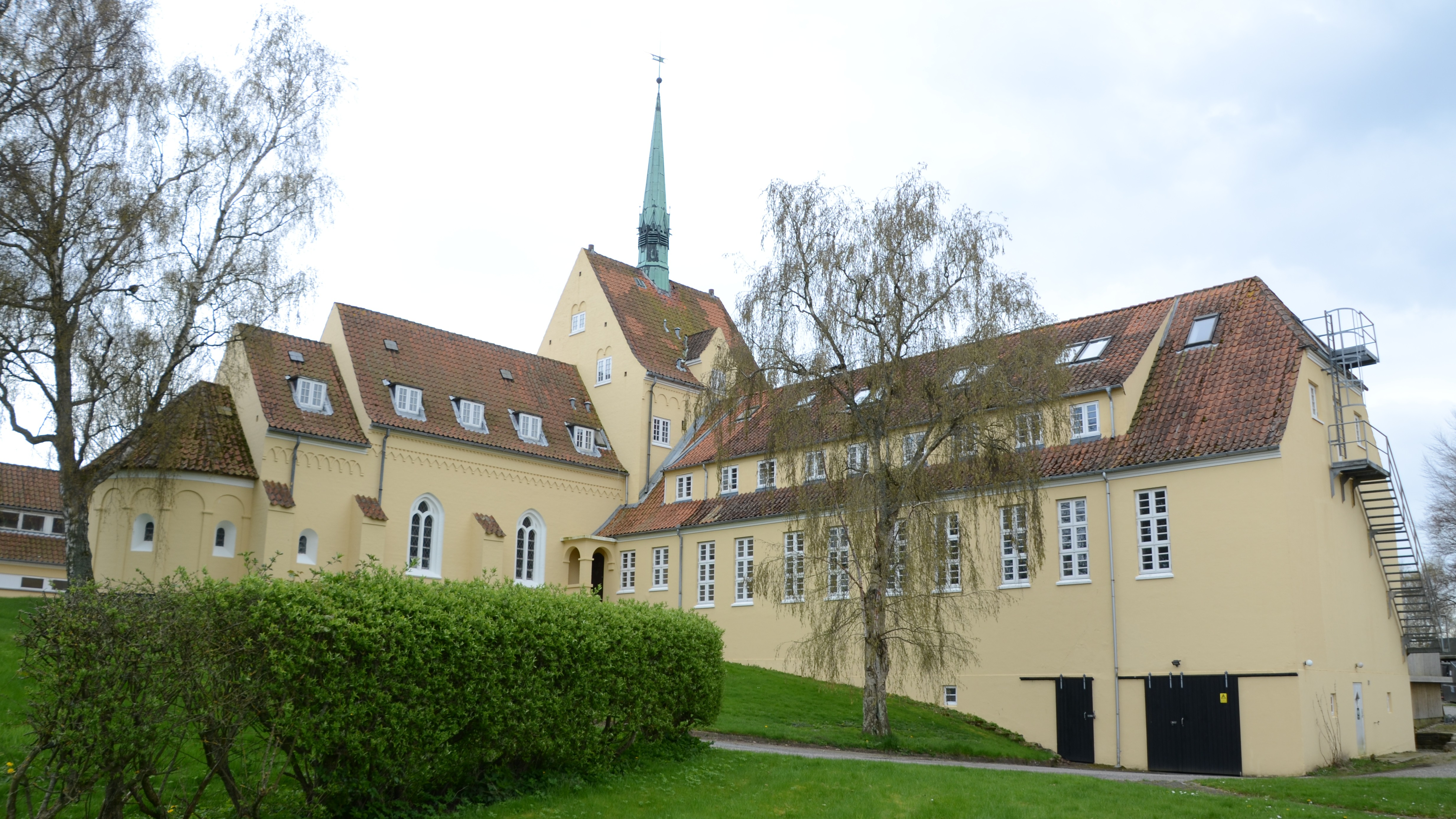

Højskolen Snoghøj is a folk high school in the town of Snoghøj, Fredericia, Denmark.

== School history ==
Snoghøj College was a fishing college in Kerteminde from 1908 to 1913. In 1913 the school moved to new premises in Snoghøj. The building plot and part of the building were donated by Mrs Meldolas, and the then principal, Andreas Otterstrøm, managed to secure the remaining funds so that the school could be built. The idea behind the new buildings was to hold a summer school for women, with a focus on housekeeping, and especially on the use of fish in food.

After World War I, the school faced financial challenges and became an independent institution in 1919. At the same time, courses in folk dance were established, which are still on the program today.

In 1924, the college was sold to Anna Krogh and Jørgine Abildgaard, who converted the school into a gymnastics college for girls. They succeeded in making the school nationally known.
