= Friends Good Will =

American sloop

Coordinates: 42°24′21.4″N 86°16′26.3″W

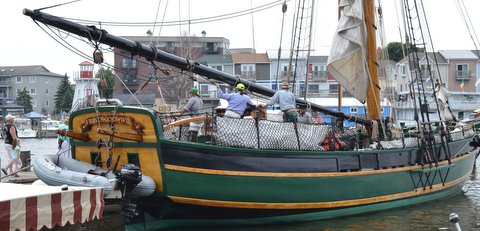
- Friends Good Will

History

United States
- Name: Friends Good Will
- Builder: John Scarano, Albany, New York
- Laid down: 2004
- Launched: August 29, 2004
- Identification: MMSI number: 367017720; Callsign: WDC4005
- Status: In service
- Notes: Reproduction of a bermuda sloop bearing the same name that was involved in the War of 1812.

General characteristics
- Type: square topsail sloop
- Displacement: 150,000 lbs
- Tons burthen: 6372/94 (bm; by calculation)
- Length: 101 ft (31 m) (sparred length); 56 ft 5 in (17.20 m) (length on deck)
- Beam: 16 ft 10 in (5.13 m)
- Draft: 8 ft 9 in (2.67 m)
- Propulsion: 165 hp (123 kW) Yanmar diesel engine
- Sail plan: 3,180 ft^{2} (295 m^{2}), (Main, staysail, 2 jibs, square topsail)
- Capacity: 28
- Complement: 7
- Armament: 6-pounder pivot gun
- Notes: Laminate wood planks over frame.

Friends Good Will is a working American reproduction of the historical Friends Good Will (1811–1813), a merchant square-rigged topsail sloop that was overtaken by the events of the War of 1812. The British captured her in a ruse of war shortly after they captured Fort Mackinac, and renamed her HMS Little Belt. In British service she was armed with a 9-pounder pivot gun and two 6-pounder guns. The Americans recaptured her during the Battle of Lake Erie. She then served in the US Navy before the British destroyed her at the end of December 1813.

The current vessel was built in 2004, at Scarano Boat Building, Inc. in Albany, New York, and was sailed by volunteers through Lakes Ontario, Erie, Huron, and Michigan to the Michigan Maritime Museum, in South Haven, Michigan where she brings the area's history to life through educational tours, day sails, and school field trips. She can also be found visiting ports throughout the Great Lakes for maritime festivals and American Sail Training Association races.

During Michigan winters, Friends Good Will remains at the Michigan Maritime Museum. Her lines, spars, and sails are removed each October during the downrigging process, and inspected, repaired and/or replaced during ongoing winter maintenance by the volunteers of the ship's company. The following April, the ship's company removes the vessel's cover and performs her uprigging over the course of two weekends.

USS Providence, John Paul Jones' first command as a captain, was a similar square topsail sloop.

== See also ==
- Tall ship
- Topsail
- Tall Ships Challenge
