= Kolding Fjord =

Fjord in Denmark

Coordinates: 55°30′N 9°35′E

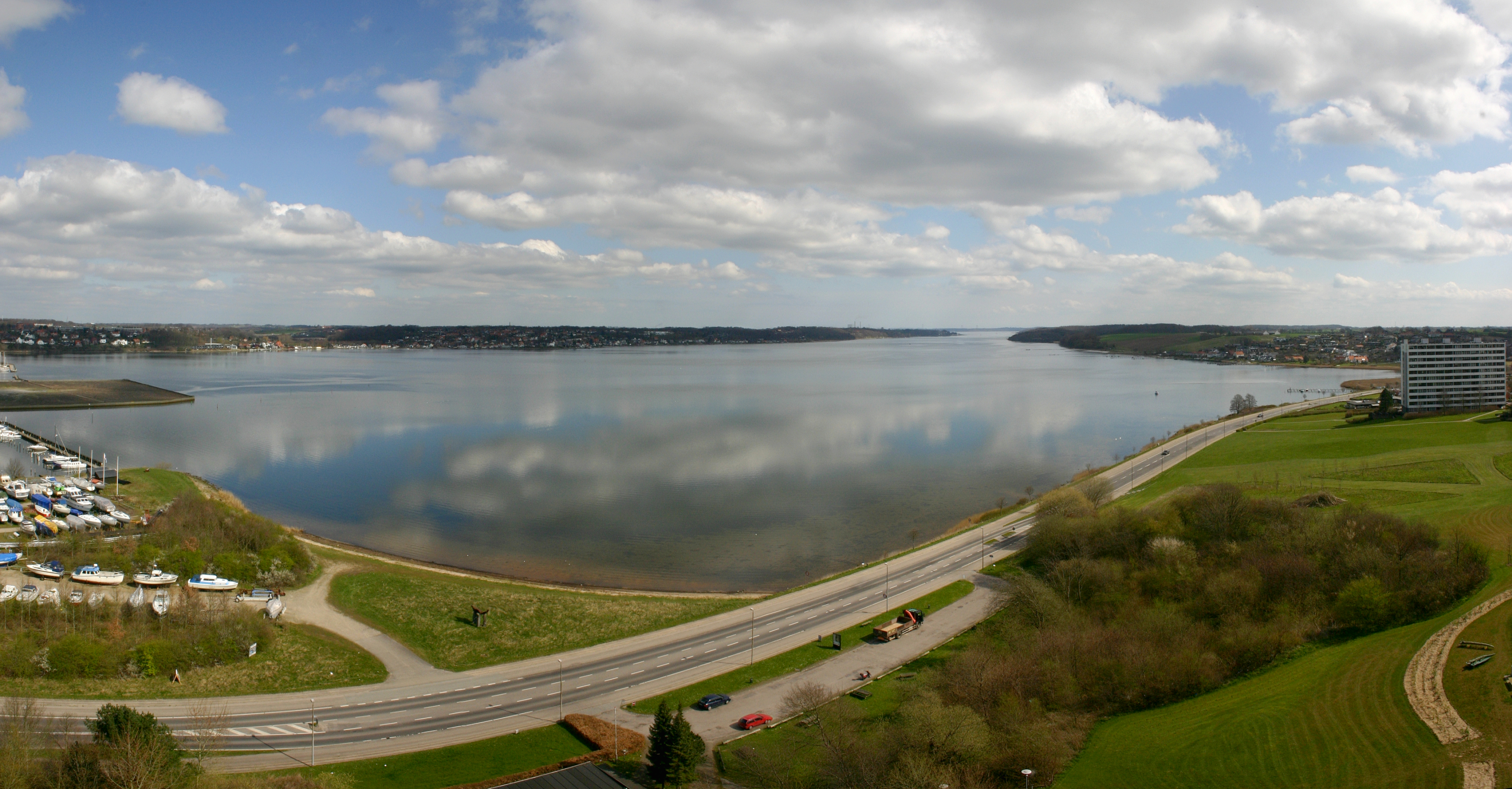
Kolding Fjord

Kolding Fjord is a 10 km long fjord in Denmark between Kolding and Little Belt.

The fjord has a 7 meters deep ship channel linking it to Kolding port. Kolding port and marina are adjacent.

Fishing is allowed but a permit is required.

== History ==
In 1943, a shipwreck later known as Kolding cog was found in the fjord.

"Julemærkesanatoriet" (The Christmas Seals Sanatorium) was built on the north side between 1907 and 1911. It served as a sanatorium for sick children. It has now been restored and is the listed Hotel Koldingfjord.

== See also ==
- Hotel Koldingfjord
