= HMS Little Belt (1812) =

Sloop of the Royal Navy

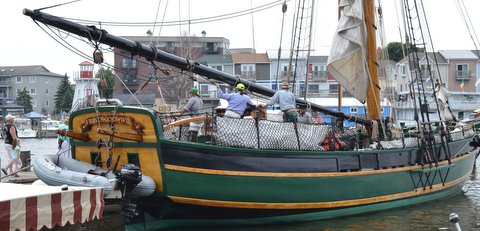
- Friends Good Will (Michigan Maritime Museum)

History

United States
- Name: Friends Good Will
- Builder: Oliver Williams, River Rouge
- Laid down: 1811
- Launched: 1811
- Captured: 17 July 1812
- Fate: captured as prize of war

United Kingdom
- Name: HMS Little Belt
- Namesake: HMS Little Belt (1807)
- Acquired: 17 July 1812 (by capture)
- Captured: 10 September 1813

United States
- Name: USS Little Belt
- Acquired: 10 September 1813 (by capture)
- Commissioned: 23 October 1813
- Fate: Burned by British landing party, 30 December 1813

General characteristics
- Class & type: Sloop-of-war
- Tons burthen: 67 25/94 (bm)(By calc.). (Note: The original 19 June 1812 Port of Detroit ship's manifest for the Friends Good Will says "47 tons burthen", however, reports differ. Hepper gives her burthen as 54 tons. DANFS puts it at 90.)
- Length: 59 ft 0 in (18.0 m)
- Beam: 16 ft 0 in (4.9 m)
- Depth of hold: 7 ft 0 in (2.1 m)
- Propulsion: Sails
- Sail plan: Bermuda sloop
- Complement: 18
- Armament: 1 × 9 or 12-pounder gun; 2 × 6-pounder guns

HMS Little Belt was the mercantile sloop Friends Good Will, launched in 1811, which the British captured shortly after the start of the War of 1812. The British took her into service as Little Belt, armed her with three guns, and incorporated her into the Royal Navy's Lake Erie fleet. The American schooner Scorpion captured her during the Battle of Lake Erie and the Americans took her into service under her existing name. A storm drove her ashore in October 1813 and a British expeditionary force burnt her in December 1813.

== Career ==
During the winter of 1810–11, Major Oliver Williams built the sloop at River Rouge, near Detroit. She then sailed on the Great Lakes in pursuit of his business. She was sailing from Chicago to Detroit under the command of Master William Lee, with Williams aboard as supercargo, having delivered military supplies to Fort Dearborn from Fort Michilimackinac and bringing back a consignment of furs from the government agent there when Lee put in at the fort on 17 July 1812. Unfortunately, in their absence, the British had captured the fort earlier the same day. Shortly after the British captured the fort two American vessels, including Friends Good Will and Erie (Capt. Norton), sailed up, arriving unaware of the commencement of the war, or the fort's capture. The British hoisted the American flag and when the Americans came ashore the British captured the ships as prizes of war. In addition to Friends Good Will and the sloop Erie, they captured the anchored Mary and Salina, which they sent to Detroit as cartels with the prisoners they had taken at the fort and from the vessels.

The British took Friends Good Will into service as HMS Little Belt, armed her with three guns, and appointed Lieutenant John F. Breman to command her. She joined Captain James Barclay's squadron on Lake Erie shortly after her capture.

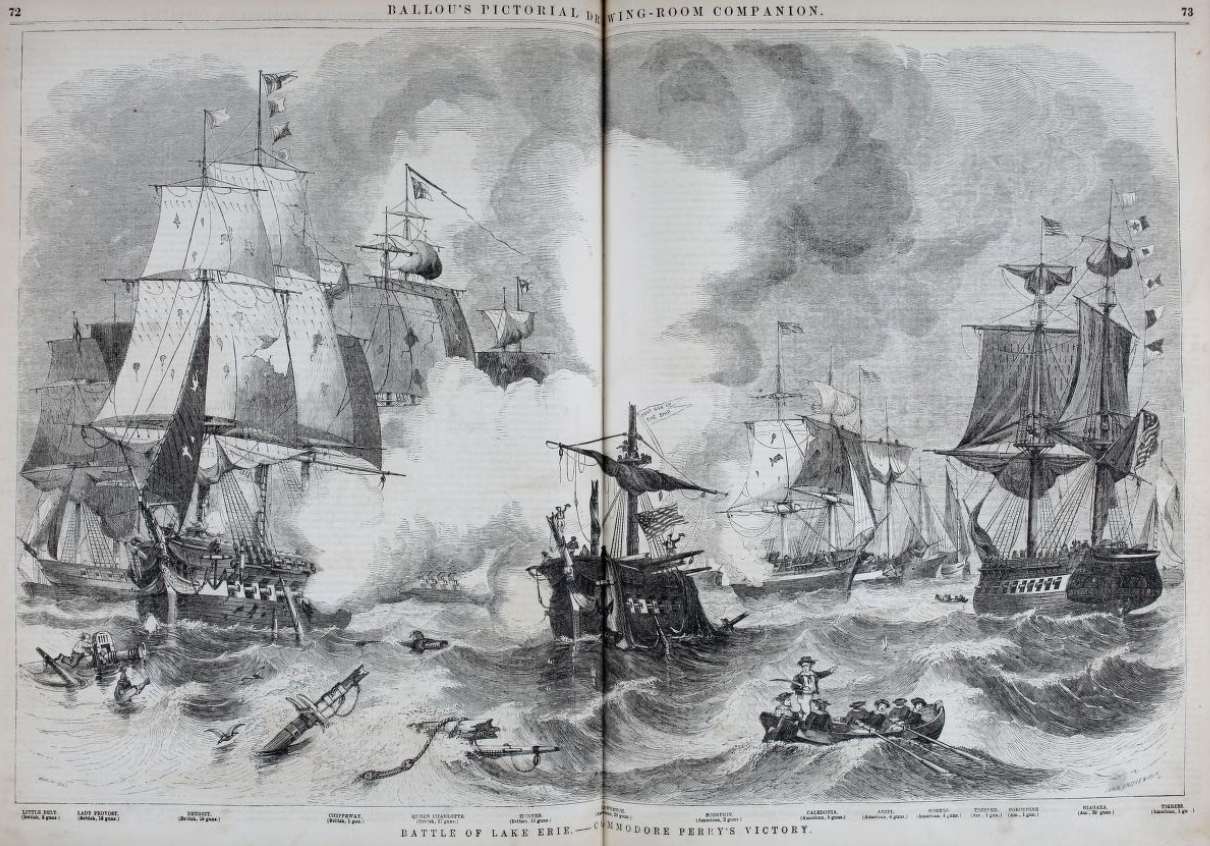
Battle of Lake Erie, Ballou's Pictorial 1856

On 10 September 1813, off Put-in-Bay, Ohio, the schooner Scorpion of Captain Oliver Hazard Perry’s squadron captured Little Belt late during the Battle of Lake Erie. Little Belt brought up the rear of the British squadron and did come under fire. When it was clear that the British had lost, she unsuccessfully attempted to escape, and was eventually captured just south of Fort Malden near Amherstberg, Ontario. Little Belt sustained no casualties during the action.

Following repairs, she was fitted for service in the U.S. Navy and joined Perry's squadron 23 October to help transport General William Henry Harrison’s army to Buffalo. Little Belt cruised Lake Erie through the latter part of 1813 in support of American troops fighting the British and Indians in western New York.

== Fate ==
A storm on October 25, 1813, drove Little Belt ashore at Black Rock, New York, (now a neighborhood of Buffalo, New York). All efforts to refloat her failed. Then on 30 December a British landing party captured the Navy yard at Black Rock during the Battle of Buffalo, and burnt her and several other vessels there.

== See also ==
- Friends Good Will, a working American reproduction that the Michigan Maritime Museum maintains and operates.
