= Fredericia Municipality =

Fredericia Municipality Fredericia Kommune (Danish)
- Municipality
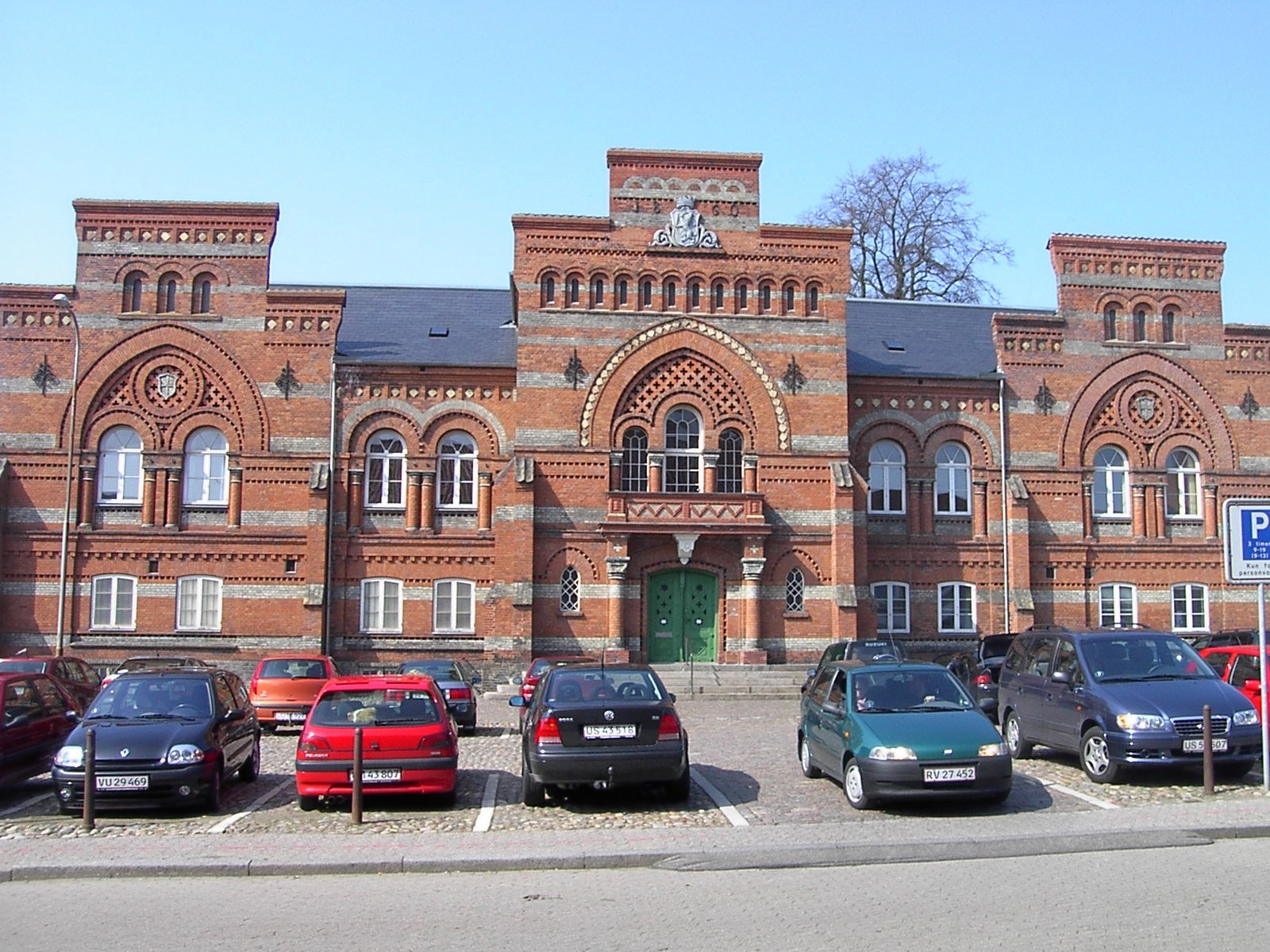
- The old courthouse in Fredericia

- Coat of arms

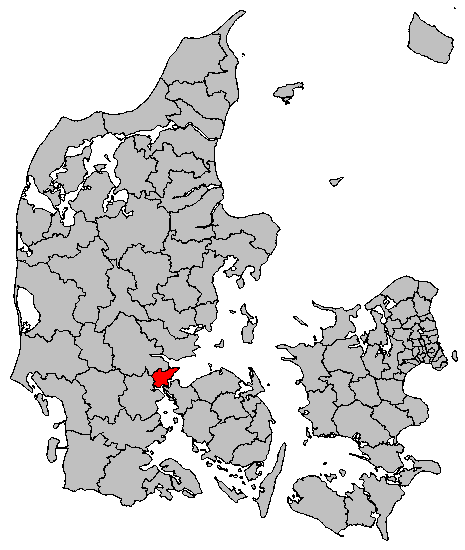
- Coordinates: 55°35′N 9°46′E
- Country: Denmark
- Region: Southern Denmark
- Established: 1970
- Seat: Fredericia

Government
  - Mayor: Steen Wrist

Area
  - Total: 134.46 km^{2} (51.92 sq mi)

Population (1 January 2026)
  - Total: 52,939
  - Density: 393.72/km^{2} (1,019.7/sq mi)
- Time zone: UTC1 (CET)
  - Summer (DST): UTC2 (CEST)
- Postal code: 7000
- Website: www.fredericia.dk

Fredericia Municipality (Danish: Fredericia Kommune) is a kommune on the east coast of the Jutland peninsula in south-central Denmark. It belongs to the Region of Southern Denmark, covers an area of 134.46 km^{2}, and has a total population of 52,939 (2026). The Mayor is Steen Wrist, representing the Social Democrats political party.

The municipality's main town and the site of its municipal council is the city of Fredericia.

Neighboring municipalities are Vejle to the north, Kolding to the west, and Middelfart to the east, albeit separated from the municipality by the waters of the Lillebælt, the strait, that separates the Jutland mainland from the island of Funen in this area, where the two lie very close to each other, often less than 1.5 km apart. Snævringen is an extension of the Kattegat, and begins near the cities of Fredericia and Middelfart.

The municipality is part of Triangle Region and of the East Jutland metropolitan area, which had a total population of 1.378 million in 2016.

== History ==
The municipality was created as the result of the kommunalreform ("Municipal Reform") in 1970. Fredericia municipality was not merged with other municipalities in the 2007 nationwide Kommunalreformen ("Municipal Reform"). Before 2007, the municipality was surrounded by the municipalities of Børkop to the north, Kolding to the west, and Middelfart to the east and belonged to Vejle County.

== Municipality population ==
As of 1 January:

- 1980 - 45,820
- 1985 - 45,879
- 1990 - 46,072
- 1995 - 47,037
- 1999 - 47,947
- 2000 - 48,066
- 2003 - 48,533
- 2004 - 48,857
- 2005 - 49,147
- 2006 - 49,252

== Locations ==
Fredericia	41,544
Taulov	3,498
Skærbæk	2,497
Trelde–Østerby	660
Egeskov	658
Pjedsted	591
Bredstrup	439

=== The city of Fredericia ===
The city of Fredericia was founded in 1650 by Frederik III, after whom it was named. Fredericia was almost selected as the Danish capital, due to its central location and large port; but the costs from building the necessary government buildings and building a palace for the royal family, grew too big so the plans were scrapped and Copenhagen remained the capital.

The city is one of Denmark's largest traffic hubs, and is home to the army's Signals Regiment (Telegrafregimentet), which is located at Ryes Barracks (Ryes Kaserne) and Bülows Barracks (Bülows Kaserne).

== Twin towns – sister cities ==
Fredericia is twinned with:

- Härnösand, Sweden
- Herford, Germany
- Ilulissat, Greenland
- Kokkola, Finland
- Kristiansund, Norway
- Šiauliai, Lithuania

== Sources ==
- Municipal statistics: NetBorger Kommunefakta, delivered from KMD aka Kommunedata (Municipal Data)
- Municipal mergers and neighbors: Eniro new municipalities map
