= Funen Main Line =

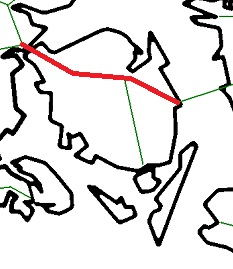
- Map of the Funen Main Line

Overview
- Other name: Dronning Louises Jernbane
- Native name: Den fynske hovedbane
- Owner: Banedanmark
- Locale: Funen, Denmark

History
- Opened: 7 September 1865
- Extension to Strib: 1 November 1866
- Little Belt ferry service opened: 19 March 1872
- Great Belt ferry service opened: 1 December 1883
- Little Belt Bridge opened: 14 May 1935
- Great Belt Fixed Link opened: 1 June 1997

Technical
- Number of tracks: Single (until 1912); Double (from 1912)
- Track gauge: 1,435 mm (4 ft 8 1/2 in) standard gauge
- Electrification: 25 kV 50 Hz AC
- Operating speed: 180 km/h (110 mph)

The Funen Main Line (Danish: Den fynske hovedbane) is a railway line across the island of Funen, Denmark. It was inaugurated on 7 September 1865, the birthday of Queen Louise, and is thus also known as Queen Louise's Railway (Danish: Dronning Louises Jernbane).

At its opening, the line connected Nyborg via Odense to Middelfart. In 1866, the line was extended from Middelfart to Strib, from where a ferry service to Fredericia opened in 1872. Starting in 1883, Nyborg was connected to Korsør by the Great Belt ferries. The Little Belt ferry service, as well as the Middelfart–Strib segment, was replaced by the Little Belt Bridge in 1935. With the opening of the Great Belt Fixed Link in 1997, the line now forms part of the Copenhagen–Fredericia/Taulov Line. To improve capacity, a parallel high-speed line across western Funen is under construction as of 2026 with scheduled completion in 2029.

== Route ==
=== Stations ===
Name	Code	km from Ngf	km from Kh	Opened	Closed	Notes
Nyborg Færge	Ngf	0.0	-	1883	1997	
Nyborg	Ng	0.6	-	1865	1997	
Nyborg	Ng	-	131.6	1997		
Hjulby	Ju	5.9	136.6	1901	1977	
Ullerslev	Uv	10.8	141.5	1865	1977	
Langeskov	Lv	15.5	146.2 (Note: Estimated kilometrage (only where the route has remained in place).)	1869	1977	
Langeskov	Lv	15.9	146.6	2015		
Marslev	Mv	20.3	151.0	1865	1977	
Odense	Od	29.6	160.3	1865		
Holmstrup	Hp	38.2	169.1	1865		
Render	Ret	40.4	171.2	1928	1971	
Tommerup	Tp	44.8	175.5	1865		
Skalbjerg	Sc	48.1	178.8	1865		
Bred	Bd	50.4	181.1	1865		
Aarup	Ap	54.0	184.7	1865		
Gelsted	Gd	59.5	190.2	1865		
Ejby	Eb	64.1	194.8	1865		
Nørre Åby	Na	69.4	200.1	1865		
Kavslunde	Ka	73.6	204.3	1877		
Middelfart	Md	79.3	-	1865	1935	
Middelfart	Md	79.7	210.4	1935		
Broen	Lbt	82.5	213.2	1935	1963	
Strib	Sb	83.4	-	1866	1935	
Fredericia	Fa	89.9	220.6	1935		

=== Great Belt ===
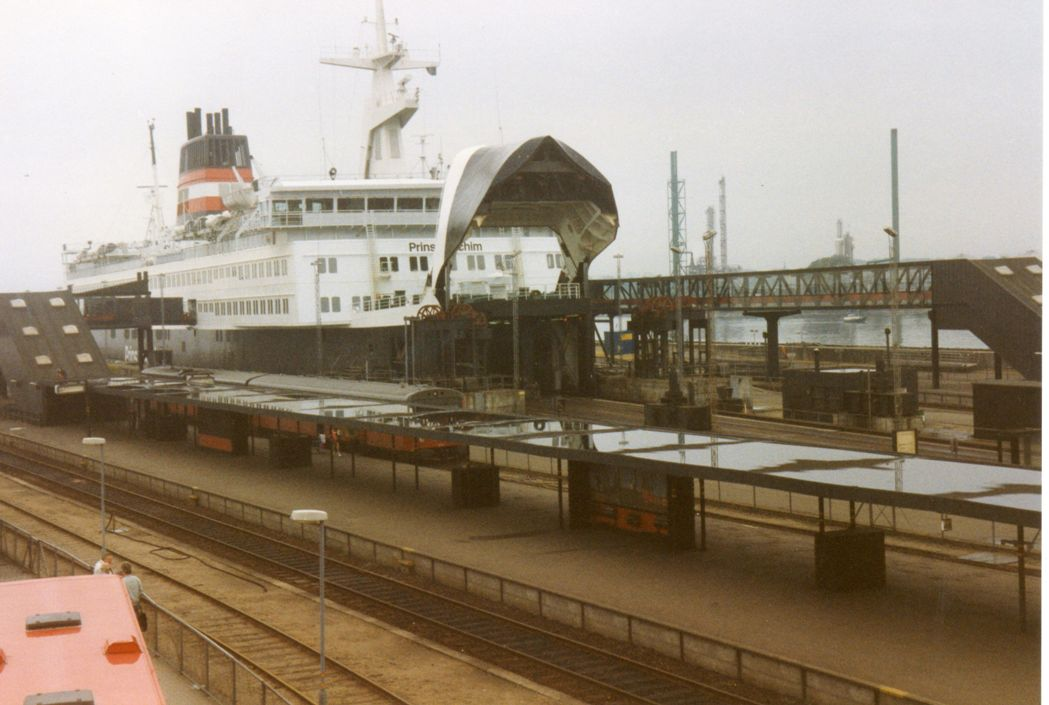
M/F Prins Joachim arrives at Nyborg Færge, 1991/92.

Steam ferry service between Nyborg and Korsør was inaugurated on 1 December 1883. However, the early ferries were paddle steamers unable to cope with even small amounts of ice, necessitating the use of the old iceboats in harsh winters. The Knudshoved branch line, connecting Nyborg with Knudshoved and Slipshavn, was opened in 1883 specifically to allow transfer of passengers and cargo to the iceboat station at Knudshoved. The Knudshoved–Slipshavn segment was closed in 1905, while the remaining Nyborg–Knudshoved part was removed in 1956.

On 1 June 1997, the Great Belt Fixed Link was opened to train service, replacing the ferry service.

=== Nyborg ===
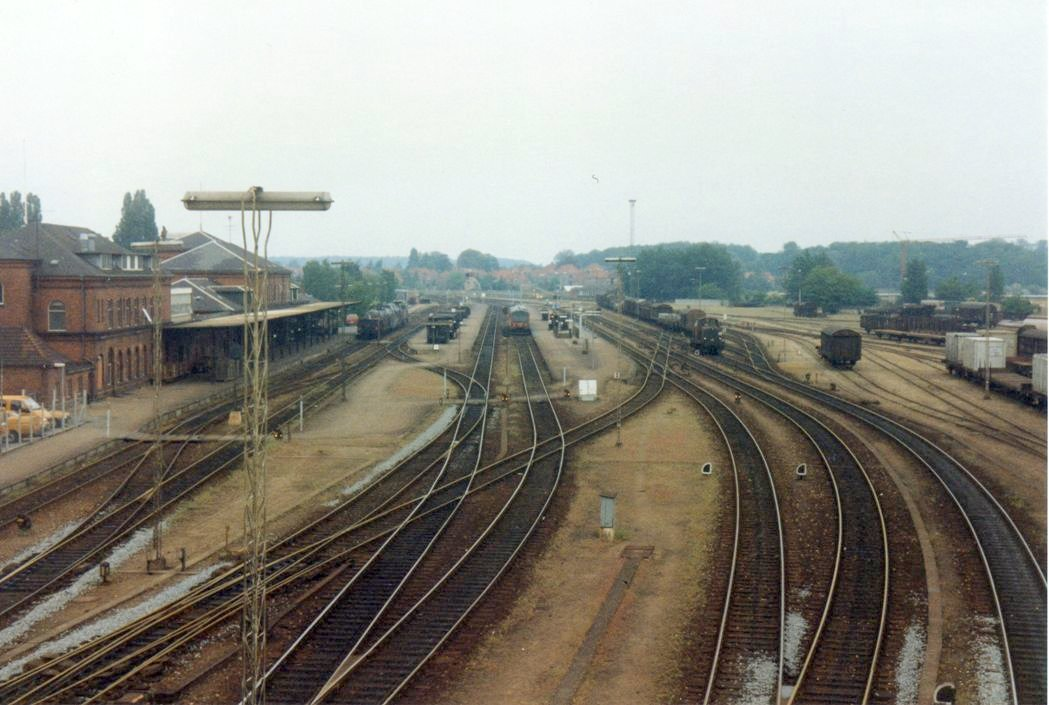
View of Nyborg station, 1991/92.

The current station in Nyborg is its fourth. The original station, opened with the line in 1865, was moved down to the harbour already in 1871–72, then moved back to its original location in 1891. Northeast from that, the current station was opened with the Great Belt Fixed Link in 1997.

On 1 June 1897, the Svendborg–Nyborg Line opened. At its opening, it had its Nyborg terminus at Nyborg Lokalstation (also known as Nyborg Syd), and its connection to the state-owned Nyborg station was not completed until 5 September 1897. The Svendborg–Nyborg Line closed on 30 May 1964.

From 1 September 1897, the Nyborg–Ringe–Faaborg Line connected to Nyborg station. From Nyborg, the line followed the route of the Funen Main Line for a few kilometres. The Nyborg–Ringe part of the line was closed on 27 May 1962.

=== Eastern Funen ===
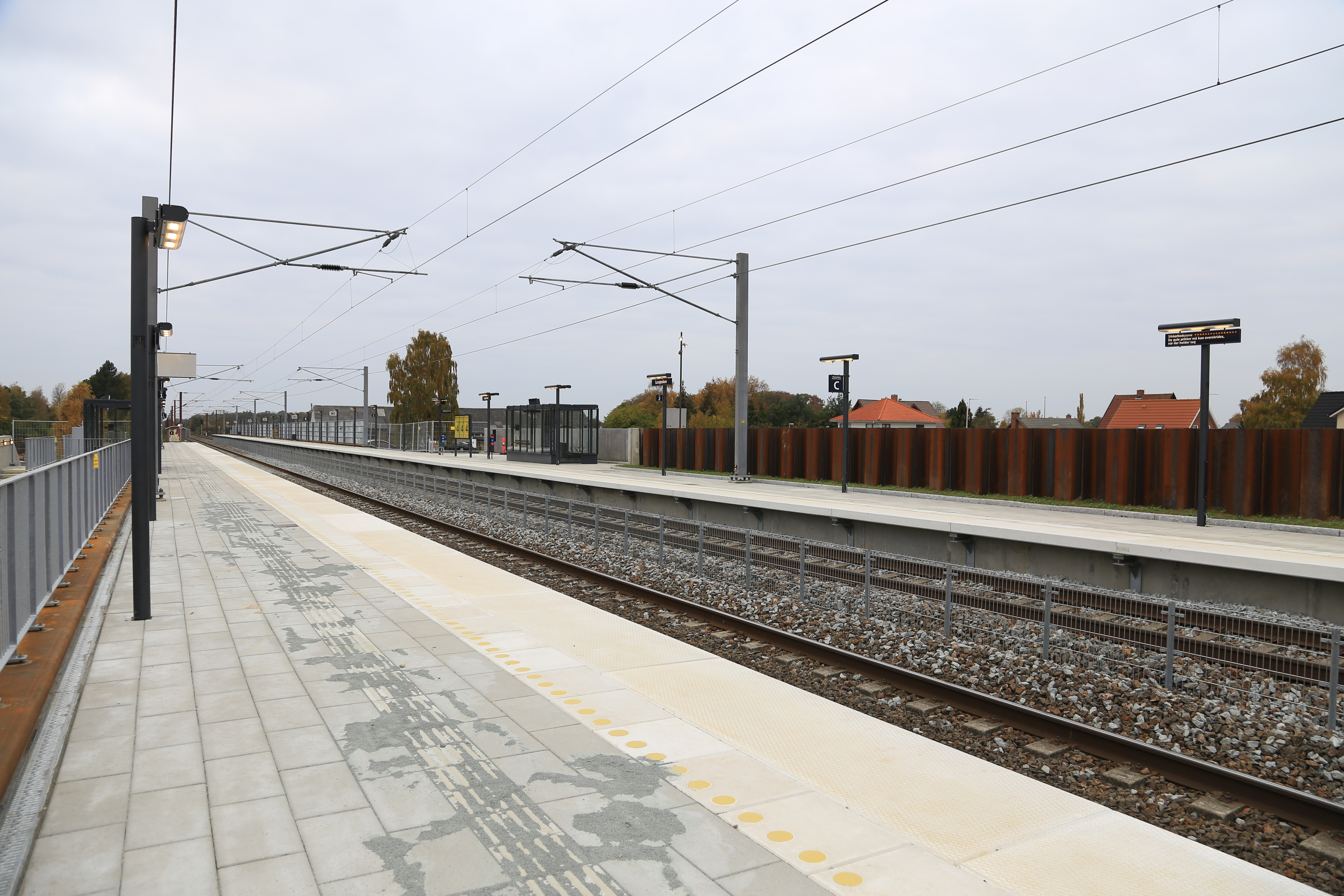
The new Langeskov station shortly after opening, 2015.

The Nyborg–Odense part of the line closely follows the route of the main road between those cities, and the towns on the line are therefore well served by buses. Thus, the halts Hjulby, Ullerslev, Langeskov and Marslev were closed on 22 May 1977, except for service by a single weekday morning train. The special morning service ceased on 27 May 1979.

A new Langeskov station was opened on 4 October 2015.

=== Odense ===
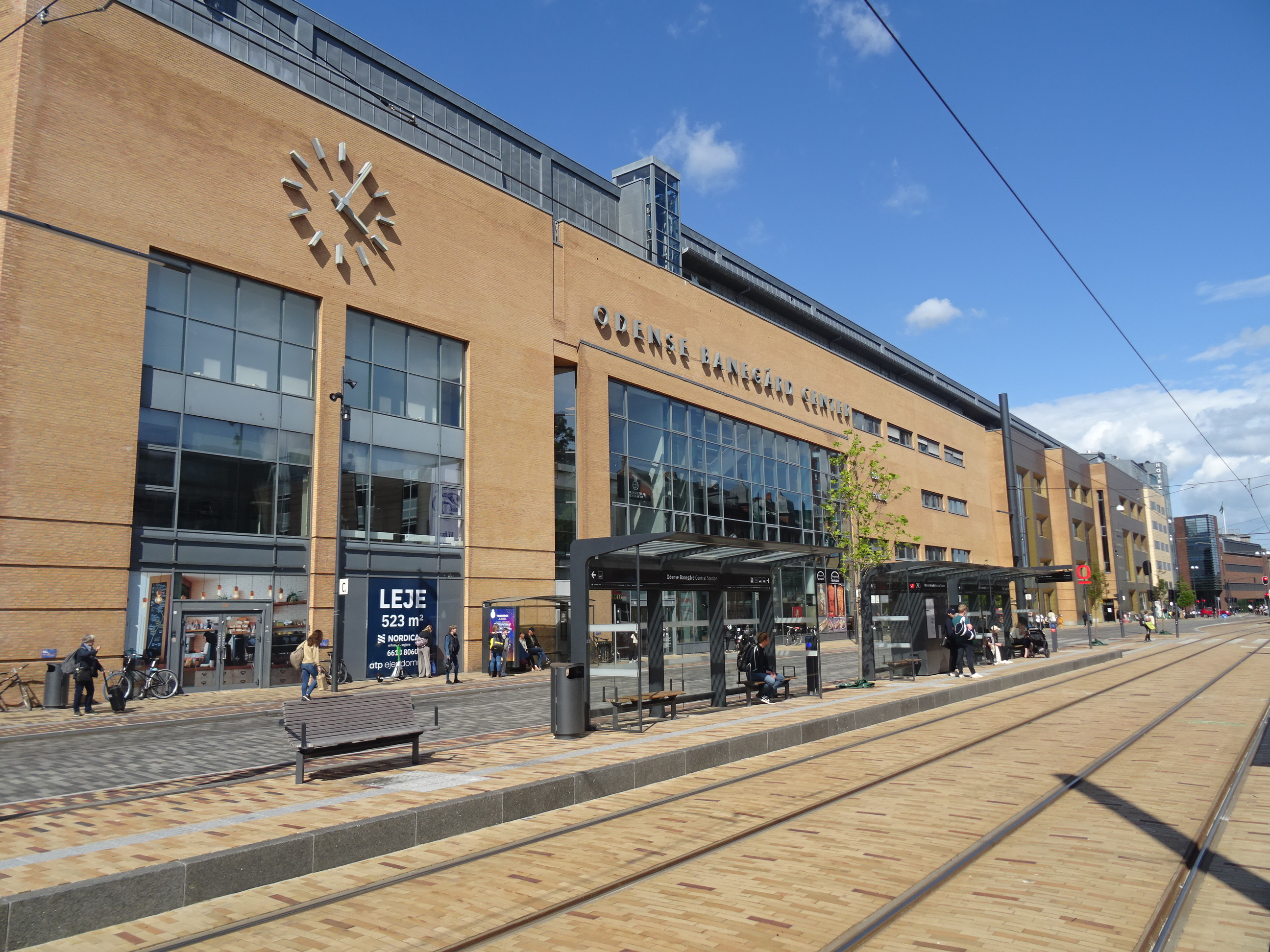
Odense Banegård Center, the current station building in Odense. The Odense Light Rail is visible in the foreground.

Odense station serves as the main railway hub on Funen. The Svendborg Line was originally owned by Sydfyenske Jernbaner (SFJ) with Odense Syd as its terminus. In 1949, SFJ's assets were transferred to the state-owned DSB, and Odense station was rebuilt as the sole central station by 1954.

The following railway lines have historically originated from Odense:

- Svendborg Line (1876–)
- Nordfyenske Jernbane (NFJ, 1882–1966)
- Odense–Kerteminde–Martofte Jernbane (OKMJ, 1900–1966)
- Odense–Nørre Broby–Fåborg Jernbane (ONFJ, 1906–1954)
- Nordvestfyenske Jernbane (OMB, 1911–1966)

With the introduction of double tracks in 1911–14, a roughly 2.5 km (1.6 mi) part of the line immediately west of Odense station was re-routed, moving the line up to 500 m (1,600 ft) north. This re-routing increased the length of the line by about 300 m (980 ft).

=== Western Funen ===
The Funen Main Line (left) and the now-disconnected Assens Line (right) at Tommerup station, 2016.

In 1884, the Assens Line opened, connecting Tommerup station to Assens. Passenger service on the Assens Line ceased in 1966, and the line is now closed, serving as a tourist attraction for railbike use.

Unlike on eastern Funen, the stations on western part of the line are not easily served with buses. To alleviate the bottleneck across western Funen, a new 35 km (22 mi) double-track high-speed line, the Vestfyn Line, is being built between Odense and Kavslunde since 2024. The new line roughly follows the E20 motorway and will allow speeds of up to 250 km/h (160 mph); as of 2026, it is scheduled to open in late 2029. The existing line across western Funen is intended to remain in place to serve regional passenger trains and freight trains.

=== Middelfart–Strib ===
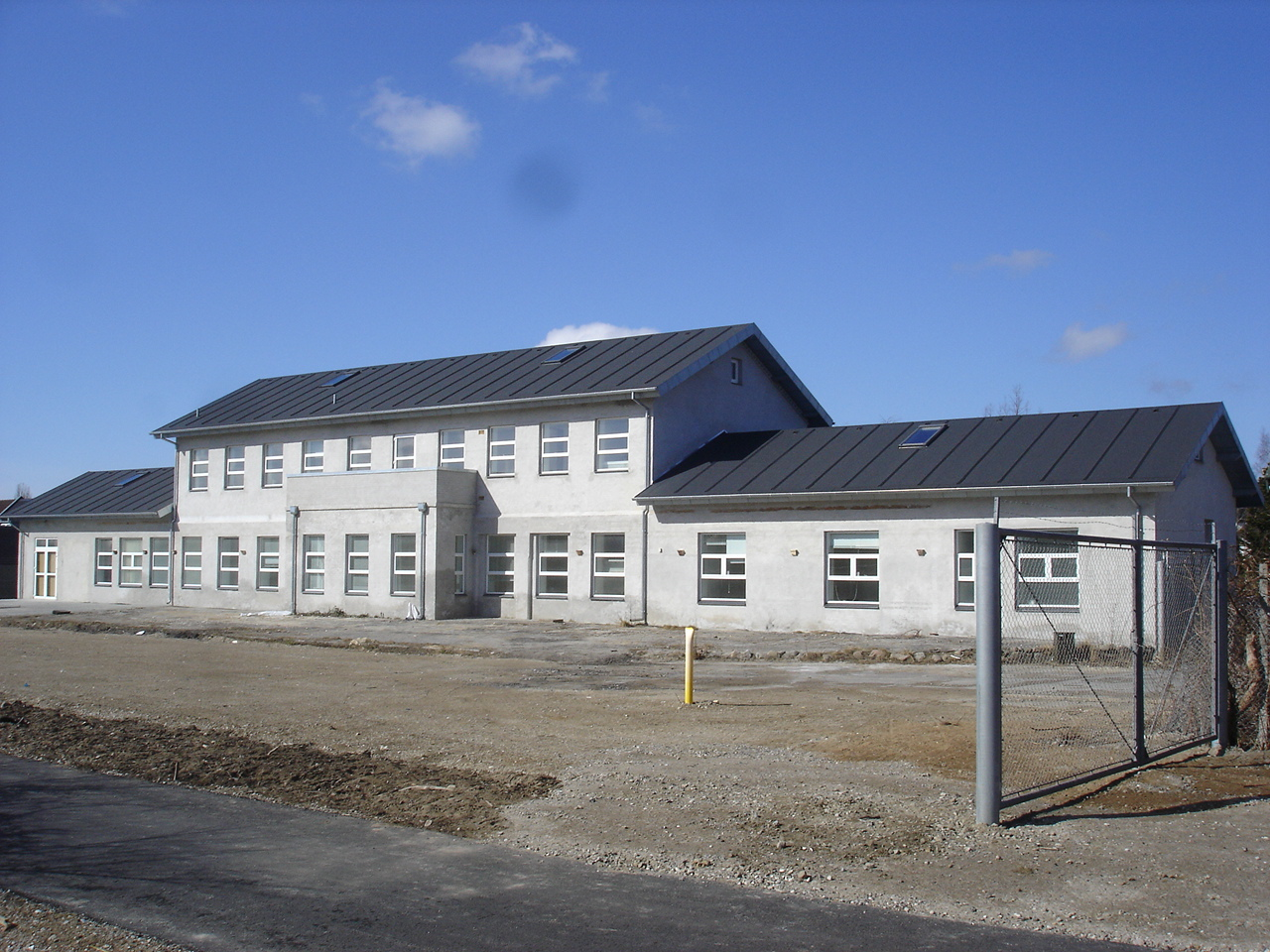
The old Middelfart station building, 2013.

On 1 November 1866, just over a year after the opening of the Nyborg–Odense–Middelfart line, the line was extended from Middelfart to Strib. On 19 March 1872, the Little Belt ferry service was inaugurated, connecting the line to Fredericia. The private railway Nordvestfyenske Jernbane (OMB) opened on 5 December 1911, connecting to Middelfart station as its western terminus.

As part of the construction of the Little Belt Bridge, the existing Middelfart station was replaced by a new one roughly 1 km to the southwest. Accordingly, OMB's Middelfart terminus was moved to the new station.

After the opening of the Little Belt Bridge in 1935, railway passenger service to Strib ceased, and the Middelfart–Strib branch had been reduced to a single track. However, due to wartime shortages in World War II, passenger train service was reintroduced between Middelfart's new station and Strib on 15 January 1944. These passenger trains were initially operated by OMB on behalf of DSB, later taken over by DSB on 12 October 1945. The service finally closed on 8 June 1947. The reinstated service included two halts, Skovsvinget and Rubæk Banke, 2.5 km (1.6 mi) and 4.4 km (2.7 mi) from Middelfart, respectively.

=== Little Belt since 1935 ===
A train passing over the Little Belt Bridge, 2017.

The Little Belt Bridge opened on 14 May 1935, and with it, the Funen Main Line was changed to take a more westerly route through Middelfart. A new Middelfart station was opened along this course, as well as the halt Broen (lit. 'The Bridge') close to the bridge.

On 25 May 1993, the Snoghøj–Taulov line opened, allowing trains between Funen and southern Jutland to avoid having to reverse direction at Fredericia.

== See also ==
- List of railway lines in Denmark
