= Assens Line =

State-owned railway line on Funen, Denmark

Coordinates: 55.2786°N 10.1048°E

Assensbanen
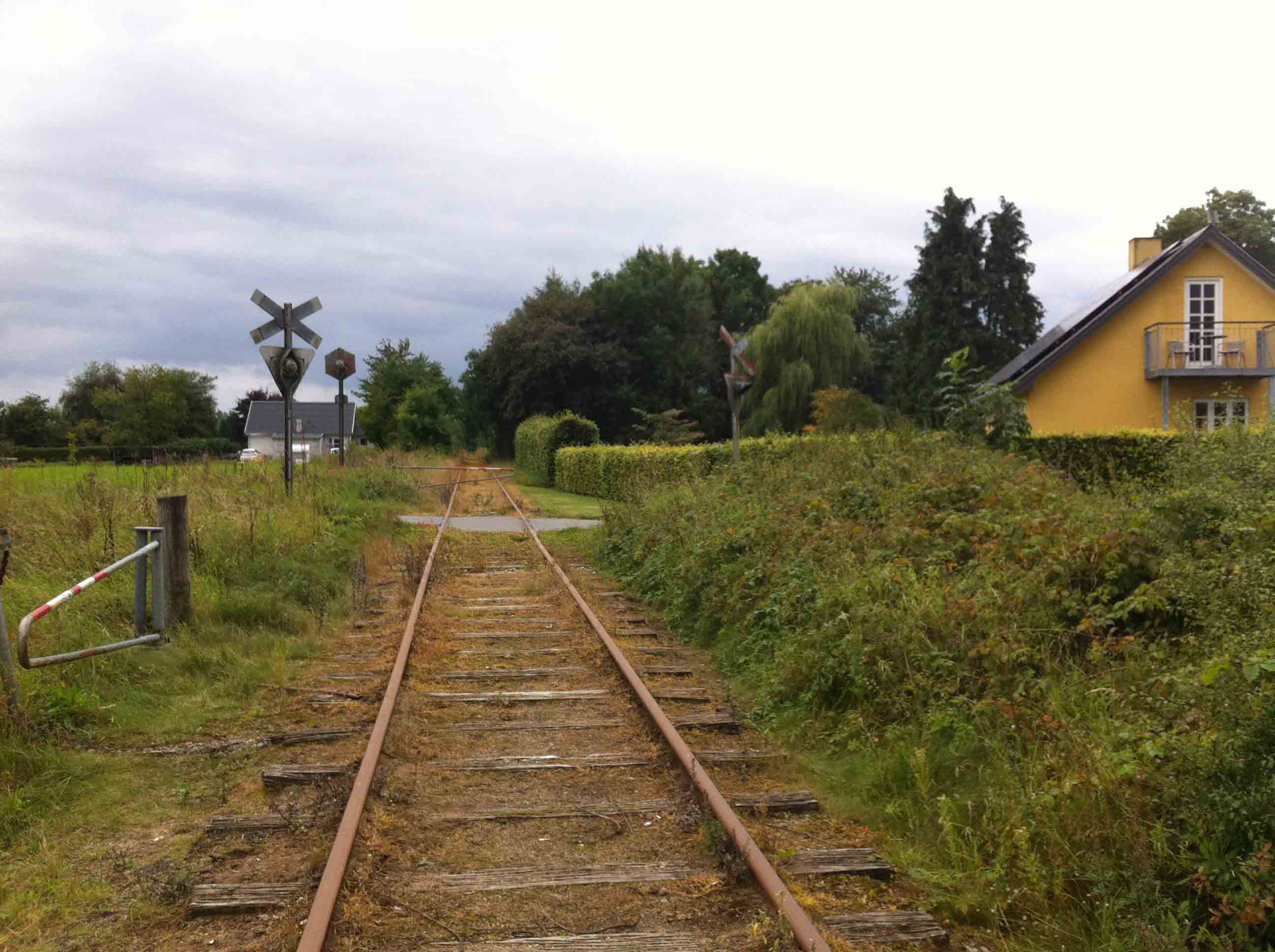

Overview
- Status: Closed
- Termini: Tommerup; Assens

Service
- Operator: DSB

History
- Opened: 1 June 1884
- Closed: 21 May 1966

Technical
- Line length: 29.2 km (18.1 mi)
- Number of tracks: Single
- Track gauge: 1,435 mm (4 ft 8 1/2 in) standard gauge
- Minimum radius: 470 m (1,540 ft)
- Electrification: None
- Operating speed: 75 km/h (47 mph) (1953–1966); 45 km/h (28 mph) (1966–)
- Maximum incline: 10‰

The Assens Line (Danish: Assensbanen) is a closed railway line on western Funen, connecting Tommerup Stationsby on the Funen Main Line with Assens.

The line opened on 31 May 1884 and was closed to passenger traffic on 21 May 1966. After freight traffic had lost its importance, the Minister of Transport decided to close the line completely.

In March 2025, Banedanmark sold the line to Assens Municipality at zero cost; it is intended to partially convert the line to a rail trail whilst preserving the Tommerup–Glamsbjerg segment for railbike use.

== Route ==
=== Stations ===
Somewhat confusingly, the station in Tommerup Stationsby is referred to as "Tommerup" owing to its earlier opening, whereas the now defunct station in the nearby town of Tommerup was named Knarreborg to avoid ambiguity.

- Tommerup railway station (Tp) in Tommerup Stationsby, transfer to the Funen Main Line
- Knarreborg railway station (Kg) in Tommerup
- Kivsmose Trinbræt (Kmt)
- Nårup railway station (Hp)
- Holtegård Trinbræt (Hgt)
- Glamsbjerg railway station (Gm)
- Koppenbjerg Trinbræt (Kbt)
- Flemløse railway station (Fø)
- Høed Trinbræt (Høt)
- Ebberup railway station (Ep)
- Kærum Billetslagssted (Kjæ)
- Assens railway station (Ac)

=== Connections to other lines ===
Between 1923 and 1950, Assens station was partly dual gauge, with a 1,000 mm (3 ft 3 3/8 in) metre gauge track connecting the sugar factory in Assens with the Assens–Årøsund ferry, allowing transfers of metre-gauge sugar beet wagons from Årøsund.

In 1901, a connection between Assens and Ringe (on the Svendborg Line) was proposed to the Folketing. However, this project never found sufficient support, and was largely abandoned when the Odense–Nørre Broby–Faaborg Line became a reality. Additionally, a proposal to connect Assens with a railway line to Ejby (on the Funen Main Line), and possibly onwards to Bogense, was prepared by Sydfyenske Jernbaner in 1907. Such a line also never materialized.

== Accidents and incidents ==
On 21 October 1946, a delayed freight train on the Funen Main Line was mistakenly guided into the Assens Line's bay platform at Tommerup station. The train crashed into a parked freight wagon and on into the waiting hall of the station building, killing three people and injuring another four.

On multiple occasions, serious accidents have involved overshooting the end of the line in Assens:

- In May 1944, a train passed the end of the line and ended up on the street. There were no injuries.
- On 7 January 1948, the morning freight train suffered brake failure on its way into Assens station and crashed through the end of the line, ending up in a building. The train's conductor later died from his injuries.
- On 1 March 1960, a mixed train crashed through the end of the line at approximately 60 km/h (37 mph) and into two buildings. The conductor and a 14-year-old boy was killed, and another five people were injured, of which one died from his injuries a few weeks later.

== Trolley cycling ==
In the summer time, from 5 April to 21 October, it is now possible to ride the tracks the entire distance, about 30 km, on trolley cycles available for hire.

Possible starting points are Tommerup St., situated only 13 minutes by train from Odense, Glamsbjerg, situated 30 minutes by bus from Odense, and Assens situated 1 hour by bus from Odense.
