= Sydfyenske Jernbane =

Sydfyenske Jernbane may refer to:

- Sydfyenske Jernbane, another name for the Svendborg Line
- Sydfyenske Jernbaner, the railway company originally operating the line
