= SFB =

SFB may refer to:

- Securities and Futures Bureau, an agency in Taiwan
- Segmented filamentous bacteria, a genus of Clostridiaceae bacteria
- Sender Freies Berlin (Radio Free Berlin), a German broadcaster
- SfB-Oure FA, a Danish football club
- Small finance bank, a type of financial institution in India
- Sonderforschungsbereiche (Collaborative Research Centres), German research projects
- Star Fleet Battles, a board game
- Statens filmgranskningsbyrå, Finnish Board of Film Classification
- Stochastic Fair Blue, an active queue management algorithm
- Sunken featured building, or pit-house, a type of partially below-ground shelter
- N-succinimidyl 4-fluorobenzoate, an organofluorine compound
- Svendborg–Faaborg Line (Svendborg–Faaborg Banen), a former railway line in Denmark
- Orlando Sanford International Airport (IATA code)
