= Assens station =

Assens station or Assens railway station could refer to:

- Assens railway station (Denmark), a former railway station in Assens, Denmark
- Assens railway station (Switzerland), a railway station in Assens, Switzerland
