= Assens railway station (Denmark) =

Former railway station in Assens, Denmark

Coordinates: 55.2692°N 9.8914°E

Assens Station Assens Banegård
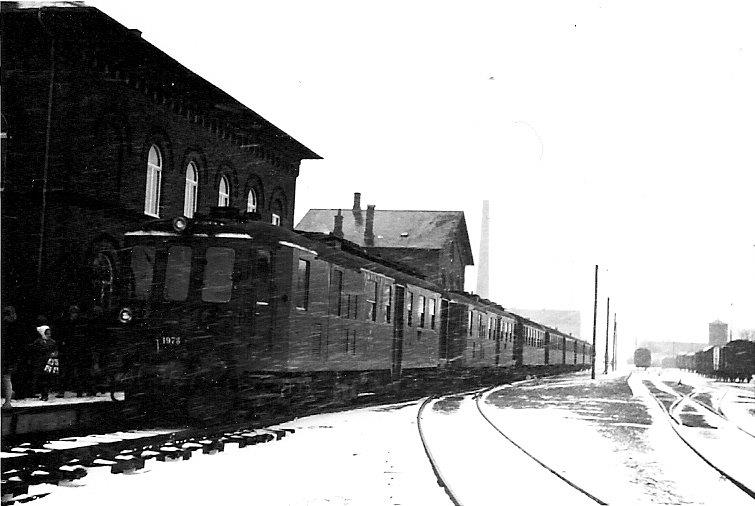
- Assens station in the winter of 1969

General information
- Location: Søndre Ringvej 4; 9990 Assens; Denmark
- System: Terminal railway station
- Line: Assensbanen

Construction
- Architect: Niels Peder Christian Holsøe (1884)
- Architectural style: Neo-Romanesque

History
- Opened: 1884
- Closed: 1965
Location
- Location within Denmark Location within Europe

Assens railway station is a former railway station serving the town of Assens on the island of Funen in central Denmark. It was the terminus of the Tommerup–Assens railway line, connecting the town of Assens with the Funen Main Line at Tommerup.

The station's station building from 1884 by the Danish architect Niels Peder Christian Holsøe was listed in 1992.

== History ==
The station opened along with the other stations on the Tommerup–Assens railway line in 1884. The station came out of use when the Tommerup–Assens line was closed to passenger traffic in 1965.

== Architecture and design ==
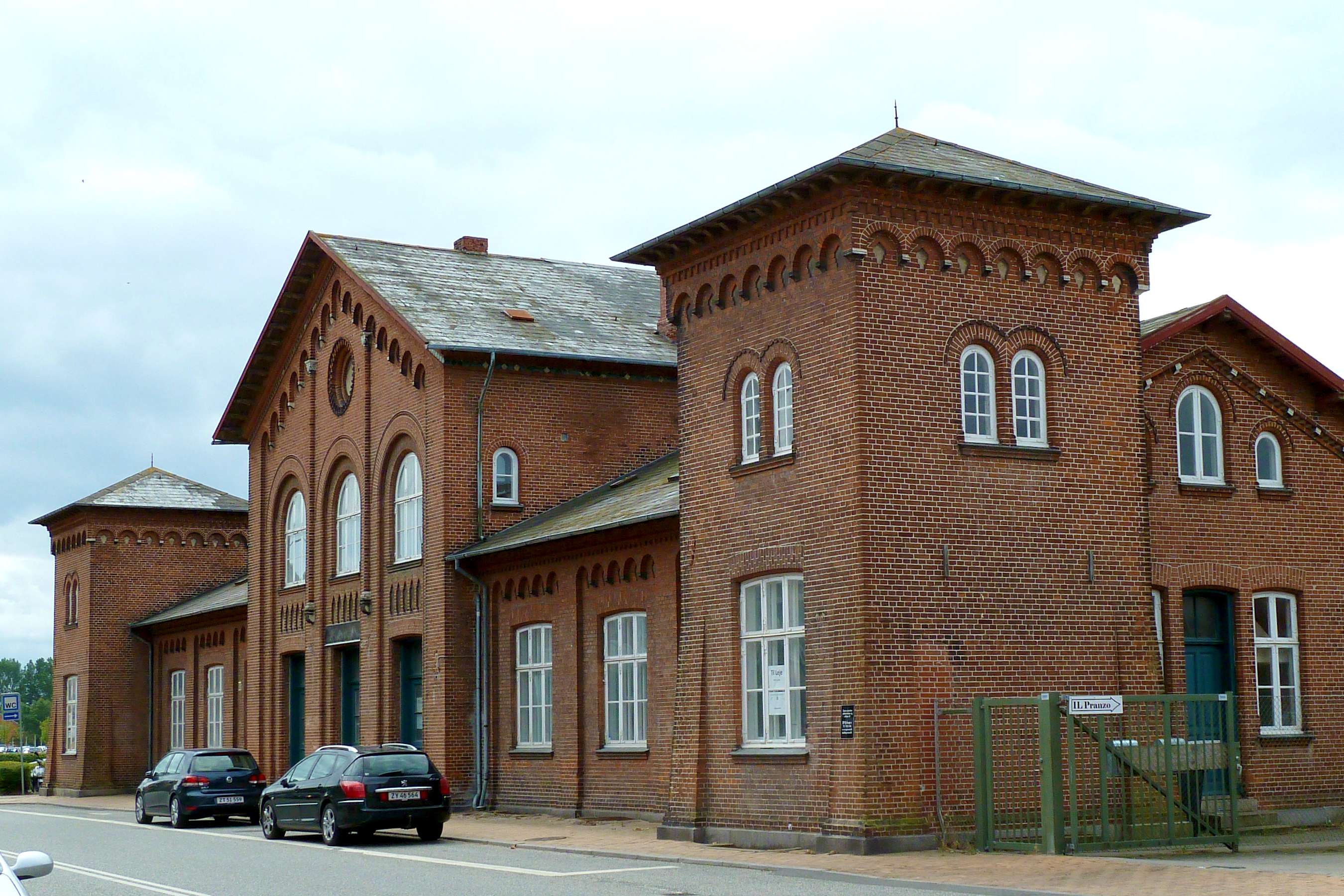
Assens railway station

The station building was built to a design by Niels Peder Christian Holsøe who had become head architect of the Danish State Railways in 1880. Prior to his appointment, Holsøe had developed a standardized building, consisting of a high central section flanked by two lower shoulders, in a romanticizing Neo-Romanesque style. This design was introduced with the construction of Strib railway station in 1860. At Assens, it was expanded with two low towers in Italian style. Holsøe also designed a new post office which was built next to the station. The station building was listed in 1992.

== See also ==
- List of railway stations in Denmark
- Rail transport in Denmark
- History of rail transport in Denmark
