= Martofte =

Village on the island of Funen, Denmark

Coordinates: 55°33′N 10°39′E

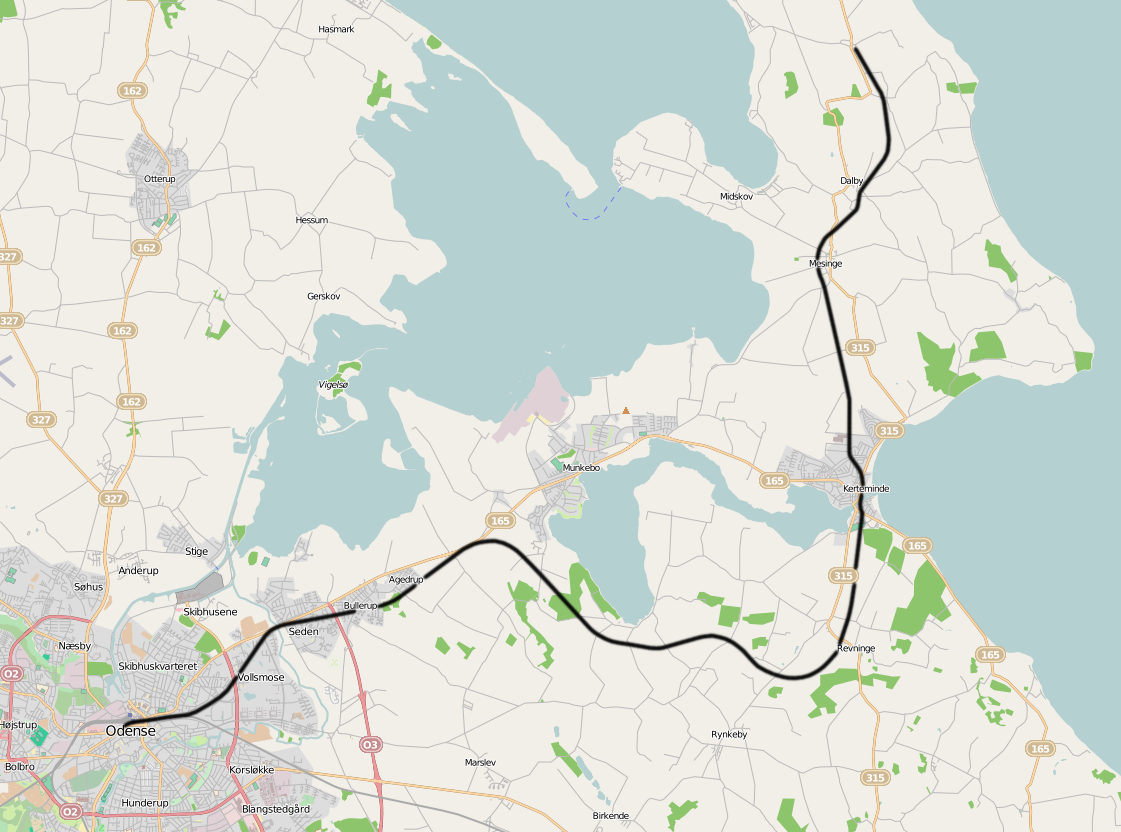
The Odense–Kerteminde–Martofte Jernbane railway line

Martofte is a village on the island of Funen in Denmark. It is at the end of the former railway line Odense–Kerteminde–Martofte Jernbane which closed in 1966.
