= Stenstrup =

- Town
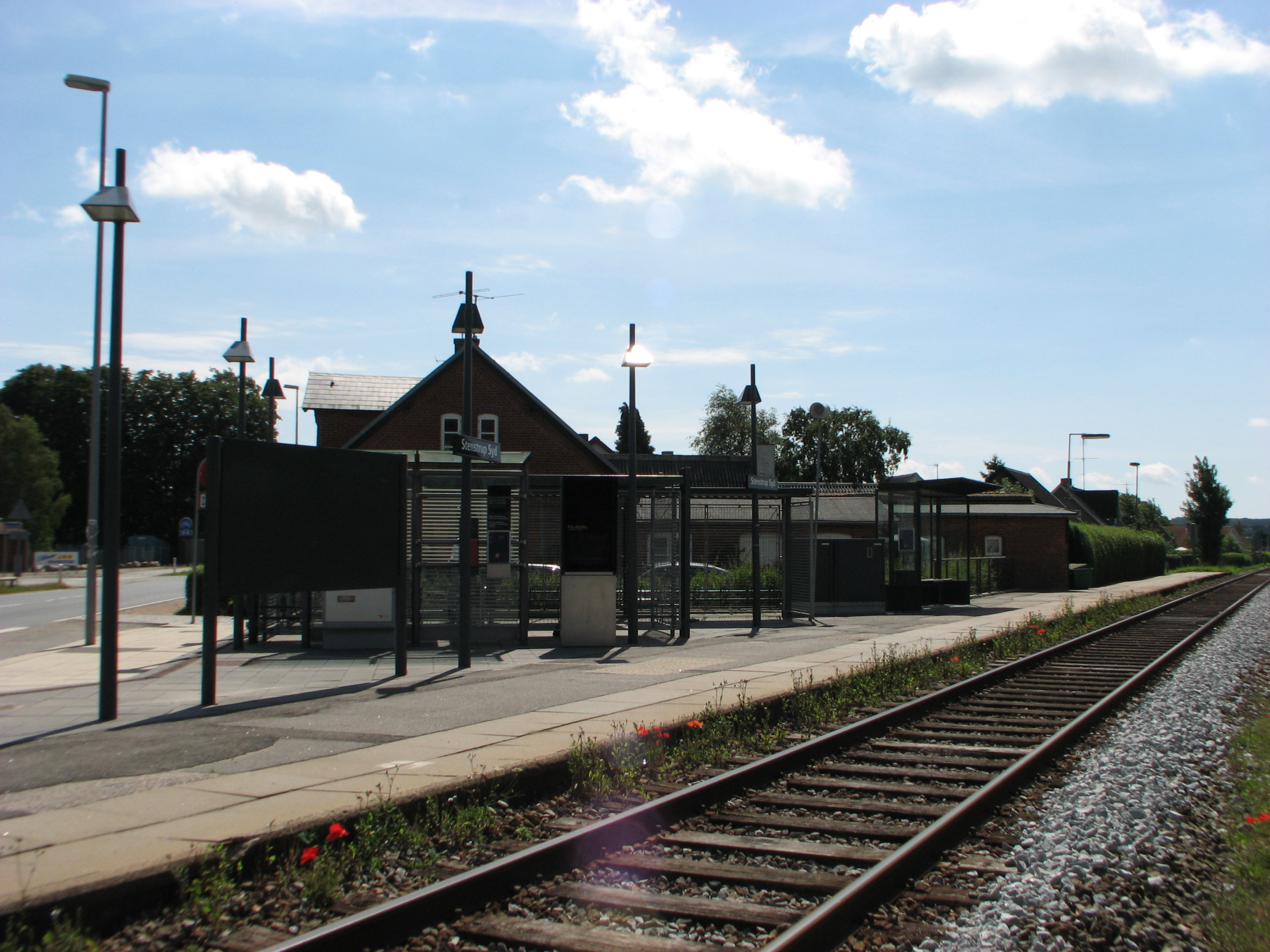
- Stenstrup Syd train station

- Location in the Region of Southern Denmark
- Coordinates: 55°7′53″N 10°30′14″E
- Country: Denmark
- Region: Southern Denmark
- Municipality: Svendborg

Area
  - Urban: 1.4 km^{2} (0.54 sq mi)

Population (2026)
  - Urban: 1,748
  - Urban density: 1,200/km^{2} (3,200/sq mi)
- Time zone: UTC+1 (CET)
  - Summer (DST): UTC+2 (CEST)

Stenstrup is a town located on the island of Funen in south-central Denmark, in Svendborg Municipality. It has two train stations, Stenstrup Station, inaugurated in 1876, and Stenstrup Syd Station, inaugurated in 1883. Both are part of the Svendborg Line.

== Notable people ==
- Kenneth Andersen (born 1967 in Stenstrup) a Danish football manager; most recently the manager of Danish Superliga club FC Midtjylland
