= Svendborg–Nyborg Line =

Railway line in Denmark

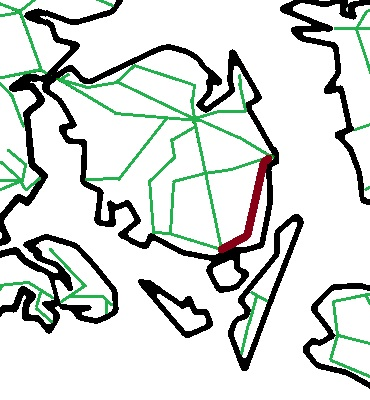
- Map of the Svendborg–Nyborg Line

Overview
- Other name: Hesselagerbanen
- Native name: Svendborg–Nyborg Banen
- Owner: Svendborg-Nyborg Jernbaneselskab
- Termini: Svendborg station; Nyborg station

Service
- Operators: Svendborg-Nyborg Jernbaneselskab (1897–1902); SFJ (1902–1949); DSB (1949–1964)

History
- Opened: 1 June 1897
- Operation transferred to SFJ: 1 August 1902
- Operation transferred to DSB: 1 April 1949
- Closed: 30 May 1964

Technical
- Line length: 37.7 km (23.4 mi)
- Number of tracks: Single
- Track gauge: 1,435 mm (4 ft 8 1/2 in) standard gauge
- Electrification: None

The Svendborg–Nyborg Line (Danish: Svendborg–Nyborg Banen, abbreviated SNB), by DSB known as the Hesselager Line (Danish: Hesselagerbanen), was a railway line between Svendborg and Nyborg on southeast Funen, Denmark.

The line was in operation between 1897 and 1964. Throughout its lifetime, it was owned by the private company Svendborg-Nyborg Jernbaneselskab A/S. However, it was operated under lease (Danish: forpagtning) to Sydfyenske Jernbaner (SFJ) from 1902 to 1949, and to the Danish State Railways (DSB) from 1949 until its closure.
