= N-Succinimidyl 4-fluorobenzoate =

Chemical compound

Names
- Preferred IUPAC name 2,5-Dioxopyrrolidin-1-yl 4-fluorobenzoate
- Other names SFB

Identifiers
CAS Number	66134-67-6; ^{18}F: 141762-27-8
3D model (JSmol)	Interactive image; ^{18}F: Interactive image
ChemSpider	8189947
PubChem CID	10014374; ^{18}F: 451353
UNII	EGN7SEN5K6
CompTox Dashboard (EPA)	DTXSID00434200
- InChI: InChI=1S/C11H8FNO4/c12-8-3-1-7(2-4-8)11(16)17-13-9(14)5-6-10(13)15/h1-4H,5-6H2 Key: LSSQMISUDUUZCC-UHFFFAOYSA-N
- SMILES: FC1=CC=C(C(ON2C(CCC2=O)=O)=O)C=C1; ^{18}F: C1CC(=O)N(C1=O)OC(=O)C2=CC=C(C=C2)[18F]

Properties
Chemical formula	C_{11}H_{8}FNO_{4}
Molar mass	237.186 g·mol^{−1}
- Except where otherwise noted, data are given for materials in their standard state (at 25 °C [77 °F], 100 kPa). Infobox references

N-Succinimidyl 4-fluorobenzoate (SFB) is an organofluorine compound. When incorporating a fluorine-18 atom, SFB is used to label proteins or peptides for positron emission tomography.
