= Nordvestfyenske Jernbane =

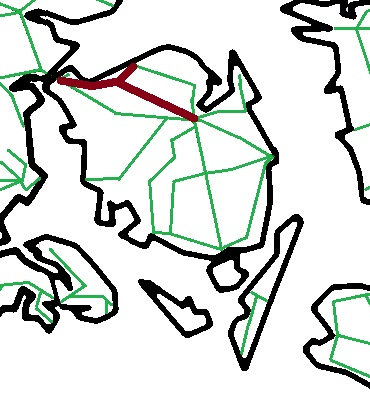
- Map of railways on Funen, with Nordvestfyenske in brown

Overview
- Status: Closed
- Owner: Nordvestfyenske Jernbaneselskab A/S
- Termini: Odense station; Middelfart station Bogense station
- Stations: 26

Service
- Services: 2
- Operator: Nordvestfyenske Jernbaneselskab A/S

History
- Opened: 5 December 1911
- Closed: 31 March 1966

Technical
- Line length: 62.1 km (38.6 mi)
- Number of tracks: Single
- Track gauge: 1,435 mm (4 ft 8 1/2 in)
- Electrification: None
- Operating speed: 45 km/h (28 mph) (until 1949); 70 km/h (43 mph) (from 1949)

Nordvestfyenske Jernbane (Railway of Northwest Funen, abbreviated OMB for "Odense–Middelfart–Bogense") was a private Danish railway from Odense to Middelfart via Brenderup, with a branch from Brenderup to Bogense.

The line was closed on 31 March 1966, simultaneously with the two other railways on northern Funen, NFJ and OKMJ. The tracks have been removed, although the line remains as a rail trail in a number of places, and remarkably, all station buildings remain in existence as of 2002.

== Preservation ==
Five vehicles at one point owned by OMB have been preserved:

- OMB Mh 6, an originally petrol-powered (now diesel) railcar, preserved as RHJ M 4 by Dansk Jernbane-Klub at the Mariager–Handest heritage railway (MHVJ).
- OMB shunter no. 2, a small diesel shunter, preserved as HHJ T 1 at the Veteran Railway Bryrup-Vrads.
- OMB B 4, a wooden passenger coach, preserved by Dansk Jernbane-Klub at Limfjordsbanen.
- OMB B 5, a wooden passenger coach, preserved by Dansk Jernbane-Klub at Maribo-Bandholm Museum Railway.
- OMB C 16, a wooden passenger coach, preserved by the Danish Railway Museum.
