= Odense–Kerteminde–Martofte Jernbane =

Former railway line in Denmark

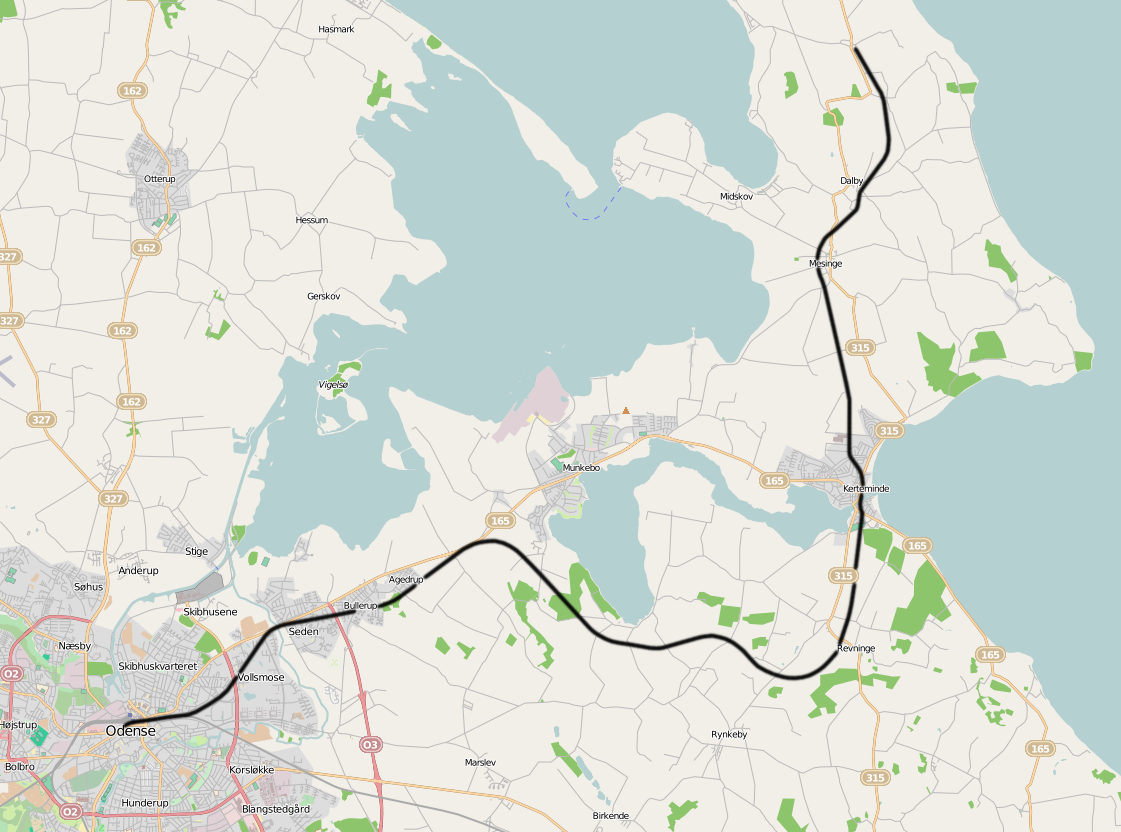

Overview
- Status: Closed
- Termini: Odense station; Martofte station (originally Dalby station)
- Stations: 19

Service
- Operator(s): Odense-Kerteminde-Martofte Jernbane A/S

History
- Opened: 4 April 1900
- Closed: 31 March 1966

Technical
- Line length: 35.6 km (22.1 mi)
- Number of tracks: Single
- Track gauge: 1,435 mm (4 ft 8 1/2 in)
- Electrification: None

Odense–Kerteminde–Martofte Jernbane (OKMJ) was a Danish railway on northeast Funen. Opened in 1900 as Odense–Kjerteminde–Dalby Jernbane (OKDJ), the line was extended in 1914 to the village of Martofte.

The line was closed on 31 March 1966, simultaneously with the two other railways on northern Funen, Nordfyenske Jernbane (NFJ) and Nordvestfyenske Jernbane (OMB).
