= Nyborg–Ringe–Faaborg Line =

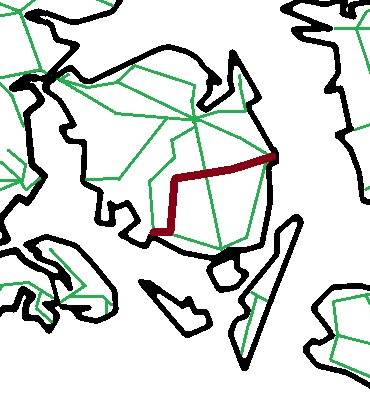
- Map of the Nyborg–Ringe–Faaborg Line

Overview
- Locale: Funen, Denmark

Service
- Operators: SFJ (until 1949); DSB (from 1949)

History
- Opened: 1 April 1882
- Ringe–Nyborg opened: 1 September 1897
- Closed: 27 May 1962

Technical
- Line length: 55.8 km (34.7 mi)
- Number of tracks: Single
- Track gauge: 1,435 mm (4 ft 8 1/2 in) standard gauge
- Electrification: None

The Nyborg–Ringe–Faaborg Line (Danish: Nyborg–Ringe–Faaborg Banen) was a railway line across Funen, Denmark, connecting the towns of Nyborg, Ringe and Faaborg.

The line was opened in two stages: Ringe–Faaborg Banen (RFB) in 1882, and Ringe–Nyborg Banen (RNB) in 1897. Throughout its lifetime, the line was state-owned, but operated under lease (Danish: forpagtning) by Sydfyenske Jernbaner (SFJ) until 1949, when it was taken over by the Danish State Railways (DSB).

The line closed to passenger traffic in 1962, after which the track between Nyborg and Ringe was removed. However, freight service from Ringe to Faaborg continued until 1987. The Ringe–Korinth section was closed in 2002 and the track removed in 2011, though the track between Korinth and Faaborg remains in place, and is home to the heritage railway Syd Fyenske Veteranjernbane (SFvJ).
