= Svendborg Line =

Railway line in Denmark

Coordinates: 55.2390°N 10.4817°E

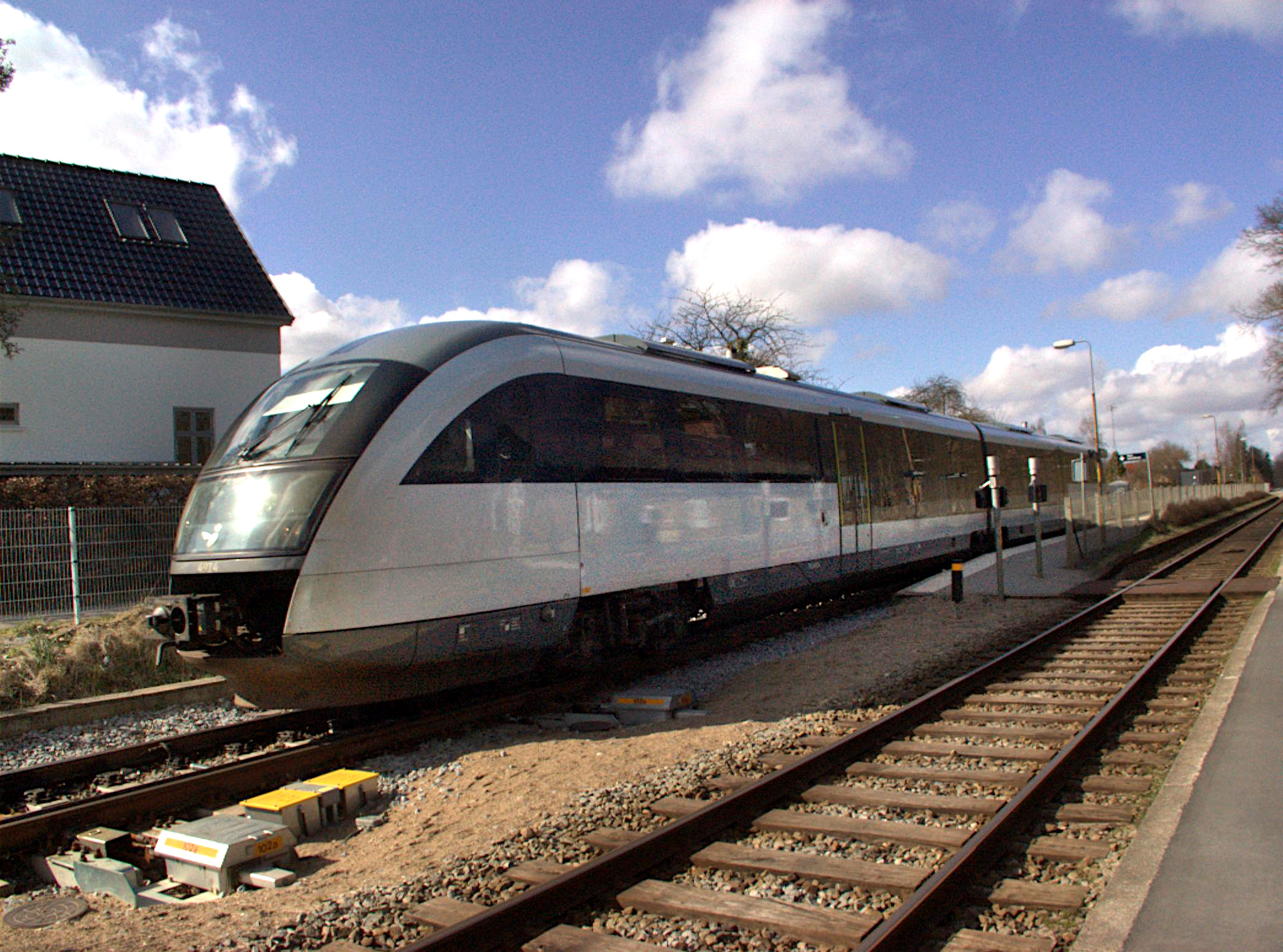
- A class MQ multiple unit at Fruens Bøge station.

Overview
- Native name: Svendborgbanen
- Termini: Odense station; Svendborg station

Service
- Operators: SFJ (until 1949); DSB (1949–2020); Arriva/GoCollective (2020–2026); DSB (2026–)
- Rolling stock: Class MQ (Desiro)

History
- Opened: 12 July 1876; 150 years ago

Technical
- Line length: 48.2 km
- Number of tracks: Single
- Track gauge: 1,435 mm (4 ft 8 1/2 in)
- Electrification: None
- Operating speed: 120 km/h
Route map
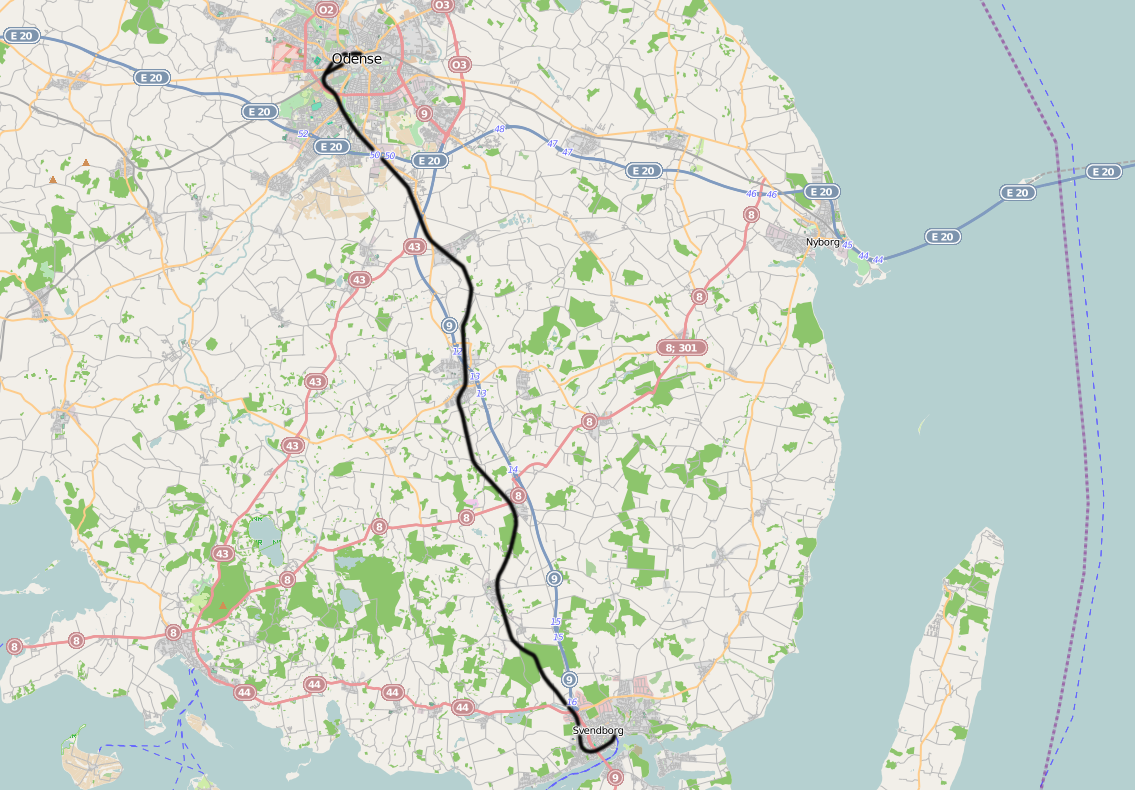
Map of the Svendborg Line
- Distances are from Odense central station along the post-1954 route, except for Odense Syd. Prior to 1954 (via Odense Syd), the distances for Fruens Bøge onwards were 0.7 km shorter.

The Svendborg Line (Danish: Svendborgbanen), also known as Den sydfyenske Jernbane (lit. 'The South Funen Railway'), is the railway line between Odense and Svendborg, inaugurated on 12 July 1876. The line was established by Sydfyenske Jernbaner, and taken over by DSB on 1 April 1949. Since 13 December 2020, the line has been managed by Arriva, a private multinational company.

During the daytime, two trains each hour drive the stretch between Odense and Svendborg in both directions that do not stop at all stations (only one train in the evening hours). Additionally, a train drives between Odense and Ringe once an hour, during day and evening hours, in both directions that stop at all stations.

== Stations (current and former) ==
Station	Location	Distance from Odense (km)	Distance from Svendborg (km)	Notes
Odense station (Od)	Odense	0	46.8	Terminus since 1954. Connected to the Funen Main Line.
Odense Sygehus station (Ods)	Odense			Terminus until 1954.
Fruens Bøge station (Frs)	Odense			
Hjallese Station (Hjs)	Hjallese			
Lindved Trinbræt (Lis)	Lindved			Open between 1934 and 1955
Højby station (Høs)	Højby			
Årslev station (Ås)	Årslev			
Pederstrup Station (Pds)	Pederstrup			
Ringe station (Re)	Ringe			Formerly connected to the Nyborg–Ringe–Faaborg line.
Rudme Station (Rus)	Rudme			
Kværndrup station (Kvs)	Kværndrup			
Stenstrup station (Sts)	Stenstrup			
Stenstrup syd Station (Sis)	Stenstrup			
Kirkeby Station (Kis)	Kirkeby			Decommissioned in 1969.
Sørup Billetsalgsted (Søs)				Decommissioned in 1965.
Svendborg Vest station (Svv)	Svendborg			
Svendborg station (Svg)	Svendborg	46.8	0	Once connected to Svendborg–Faaborgbanen and Svendborg–Nyborgbanen.

== Decommissioned stations ==
=== Odense Syd (1876–1954) ===
Odense Syd (also known as Odense Sydbanegård, Odense S., Odense SFJ) on Vestre Stationsvej 5, was the main station of Odense from its opening until and including 22 May 1954. Subsequently, to this, Odense Banegård on Østre Stationsvej has been used. The old station building opened on 8 December 1954 as a bus station, which, on 28 May 1978, was moved to Dannebrogsgade on the other side of the tracks. The building is now used by the administration of Fyns Almennyttige Boligselskab. The two-story building was drawn by H.A.W. Haughsted in a renaissance style built in 1876 for the opening of the line. In 1911, the wings, drawn by J. Vilhelm Petersen, were added.

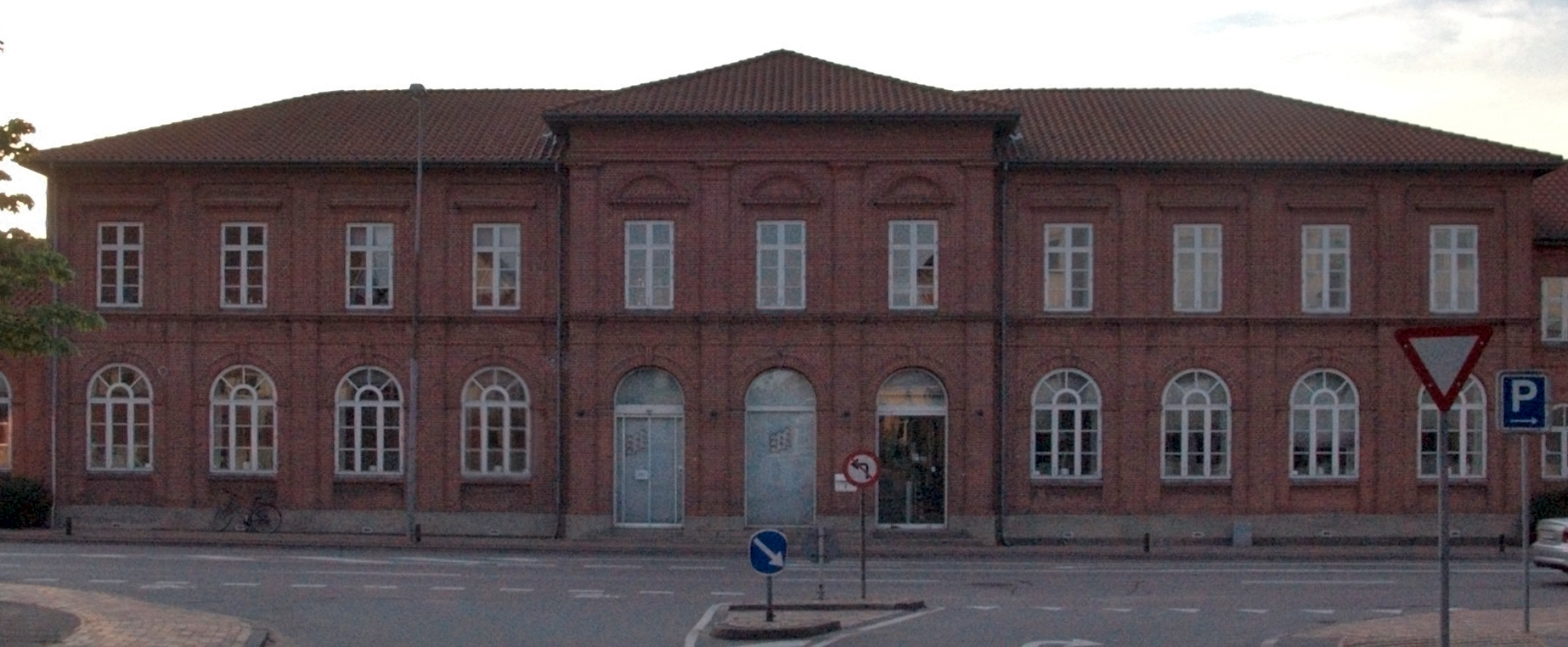
The former Sydfyenske Banegaard, Odense Syd, on Vestre Stationsvej in Odense.

=== Lindved (1934–1955) ===
The stop Lindved railway stop lay in the village of Lindved between Hjallese and Højby in the period between 15 May 1934 and 21 May 1955, and had been added due to a desire from inhabitants of the area.

=== Kirkeby (1881–1969) ===
The expenses for the construction of the station at Kirkeby Heath (now the Kirkeby Forest), ca. 1.5 km from Kirkeby, were covered by chamberlain Otto Ditlev Rosenørn-Lehn (who was minister of foreign affairs in the Estrup cabinet) from the estate of Hvidkilde, who wanted a loading place for lumber production. The station opened on 24 August 1881. In 1907, the station building was demolished and replaced by a new building. On 29 June 1965, the building was decommissioned as a station, and as of 1 June 1969, the trains no longer stopped at the station.

=== Sørup (1876–1965) ===
Sørup Station, located between Kirkeby and Svendborg, was built for the opening of the line in 1876. The last train stopped at the station on 29 May 1965.

== Railway renovation ==
The line was renovated several times from 2003 to 2009. From 12 May 2003 to 9 June 2003, the technical facilities were expanded, tracks and ties were replaced and individual crossings were eliminated. Some stations had their platforms extended or changed. In Odense, a track (now called track 8) was added north of track 7, between the platform belonging to track 7 and the bus station parking lot. During this period, the trains were replaced by train buses.

From 11 August to 7 September 2003 25 km of tracks and 20,000 new ties were placed, and 15,000 sqm of rubble was cleaned between Stenstrup and Årslev. During this period, the trains were replaced by train buses.

As part of this renovation, the station buildings in Hjallese, Højby, Pederstrup, Rudme and Stenstrup were demolished, and the areas modernized.

In January 2004, fares were free between Odense and Svendborg to compensate for the many cancellations and delays in 2003.

DSB rented twelve Desiro train sets to replace the MR-MRD train sets that had driven on the line since 1980. This allowed a speed increase from 100 to 120 km/h, and the introduction of a half-hour schedule in both directions between Odense and Svendborg, and a one-hour schedule in both directions between Odense and Ringe.

In 2005, additional renovations were carried out; among other things, the signals were repaired or replaced, and the tracks polished or replaced.

During the preparations for the renovation of tracks and a crossing at Svendborg Station, in May 2007, additional remains of an already-known medieval Catholic monastery was found under the tracks, for which reason the passengers were transported by train bus between Svendborg Station and Svendborg West during the first month. After this, the train drove to a temporary platform close to Svendborg Station until the completion of the archeological surveys and the reestablishment of the line on 28 January 2008.

From 30 May to 9 August 2009, the two remaining stretches were renovated, Svendborg–Stenstrup and Årslev–Odense, a total of 27 km. The ties were replaced, and the tracks replaced. Furthermore, thirteen bridges on the entire stretch were maintained, in addition to a conversion of nine crossings and the replacement of two railroad switches. During the renovation, the line was closed between Svendborg and Ringe until school summer holidays, and completely closed during the holidays. On the closed-down stretches, the passengers were transported by train buses.

== Operational irregularities ==
For several years, delays and cancellations have been frequent on the Svendborg line. There have been reports of faints and anxiety attacks because of overfilled trains. During the interval January–October 2006, the average proportion of customers that reached their destinations less than 3 minutes delayed was 86.9%.

== Gallery ==
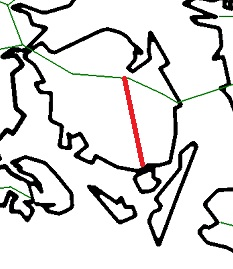
Svendborgbanen.

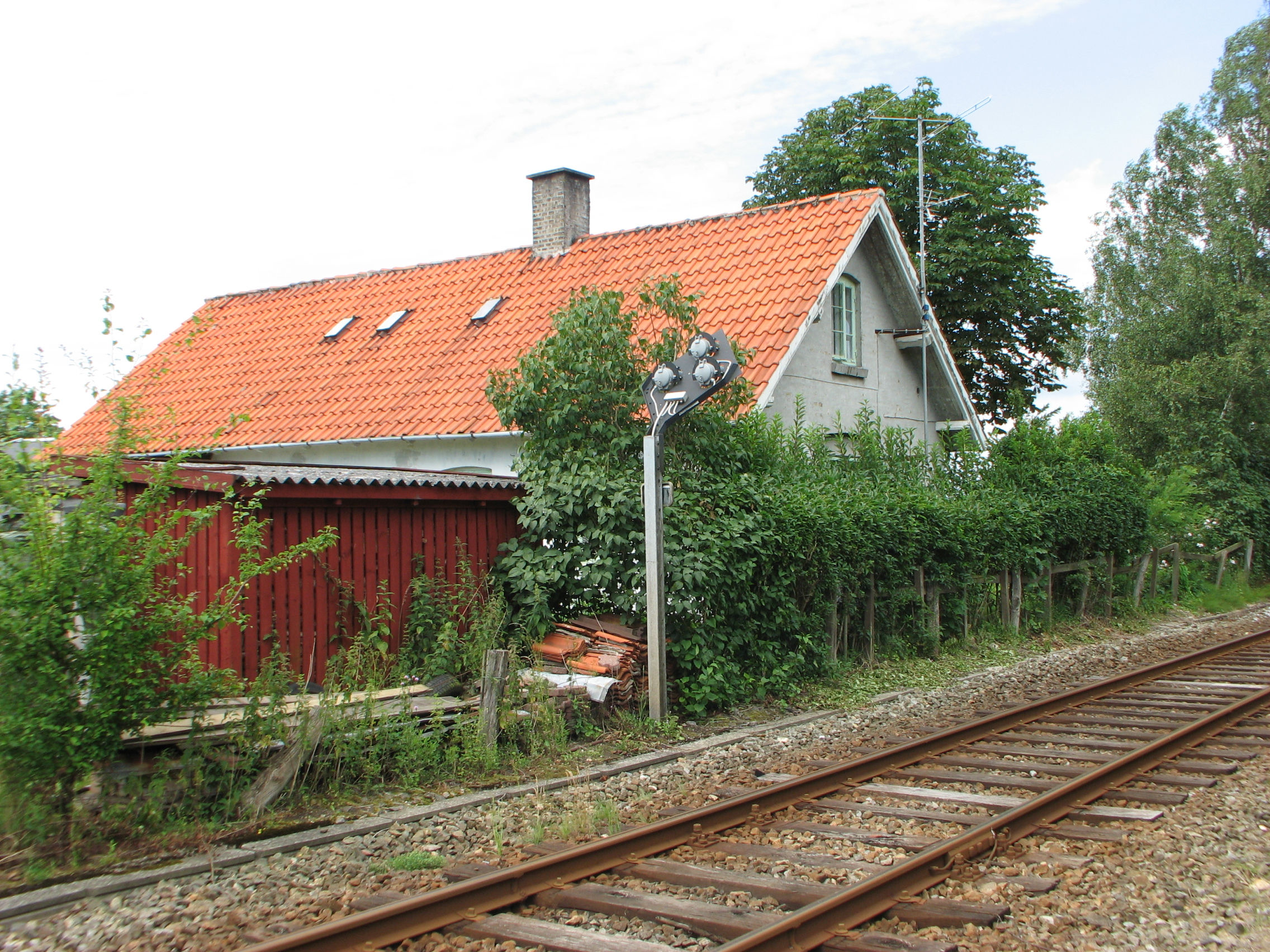
The closed-down station in Sørup, north of Svendborg.

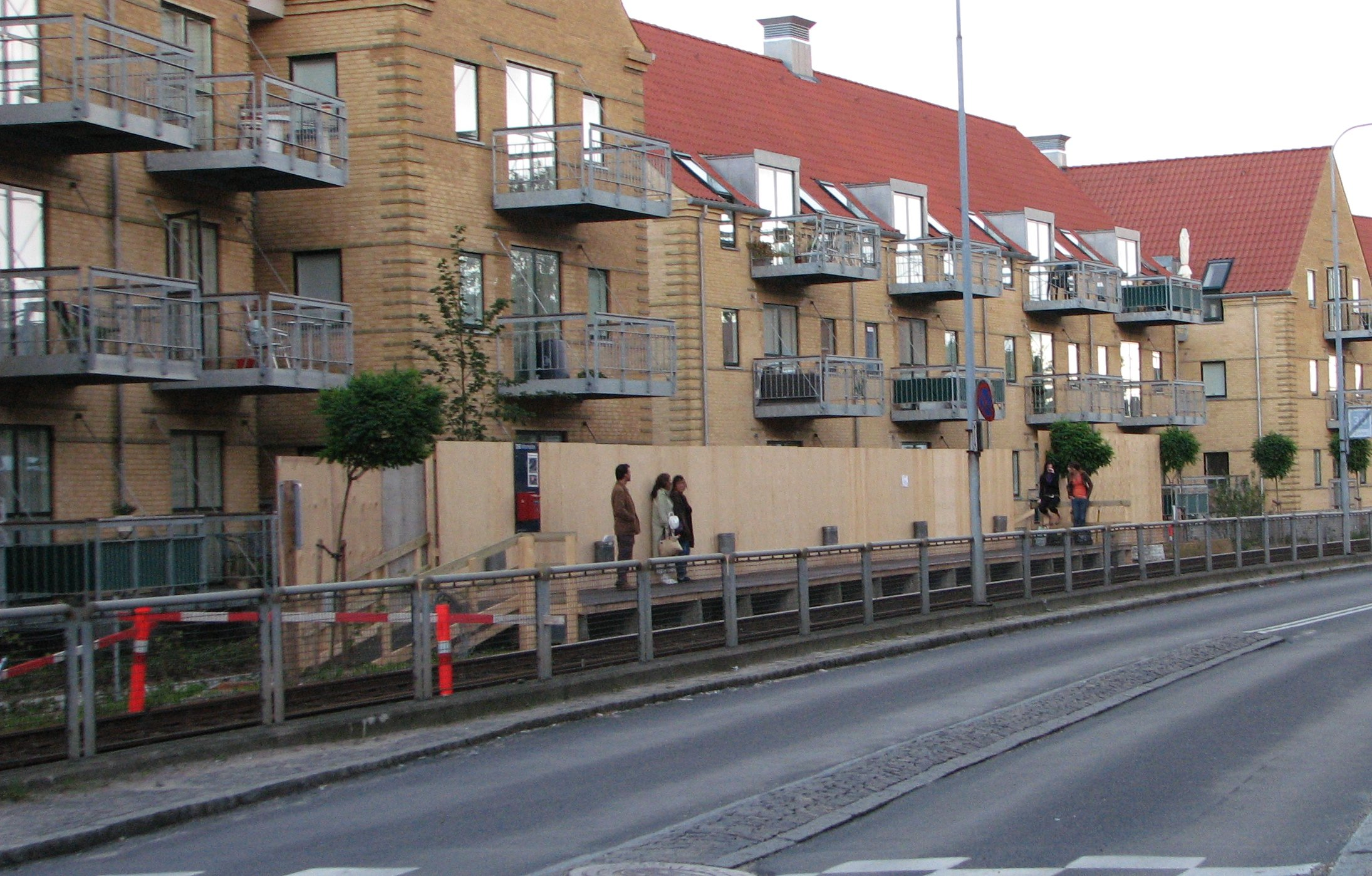
Temporary platform in the summer of 2007, placed ca. 150 meters from Svendborg Station.
