= Nordfyenske Jernbane =

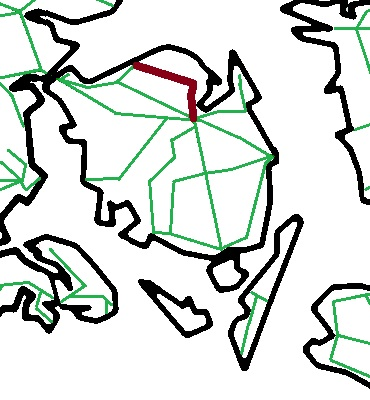

Overview
- Status: Closed
- Termini: Odense station; Bogense station
- Stations: 16

History
- Opened: June 30, 1882
- Closed: March 31, 1966

Technical
- Line length: 37.1 km (23.1 mi)
- Number of tracks: Single
- Track gauge: 1,435 mm (4 ft 8 1/2 in)
- Electrification: None
Route map
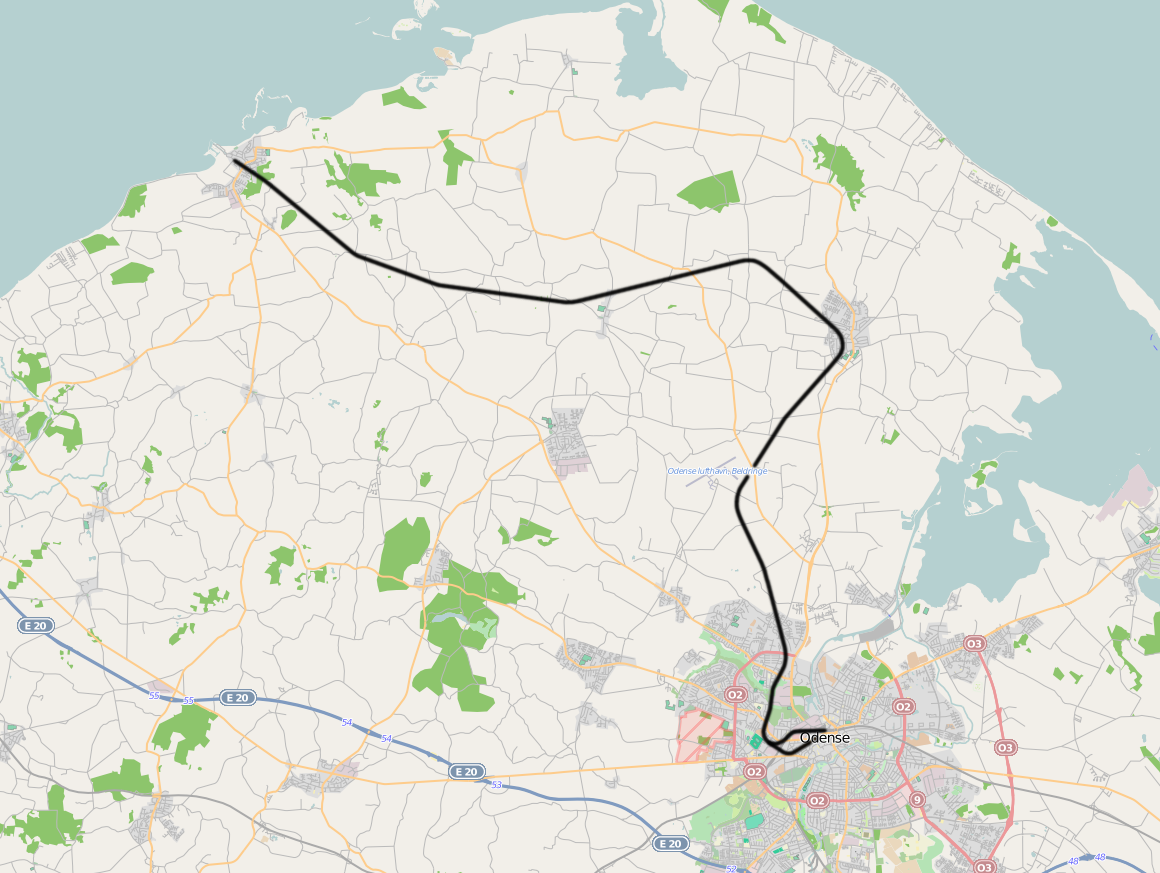
Map of Nordfyenske Jernbane

Nordfyenske Jernbane (Railway of North Funen, abbreviated NFJ) was a Danish railway connecting Odense to the coastal town of Bogense.

The line was closed on March 31, 1966, simultaneously with the two other railways on northern Funen, OMB and OKMJ. Though the tracks have been removed, many of the station buildings still exist, being used for various purposes.
