= Svendborg railway station =

Railway station in Svendborg, Denmark

Svendborg
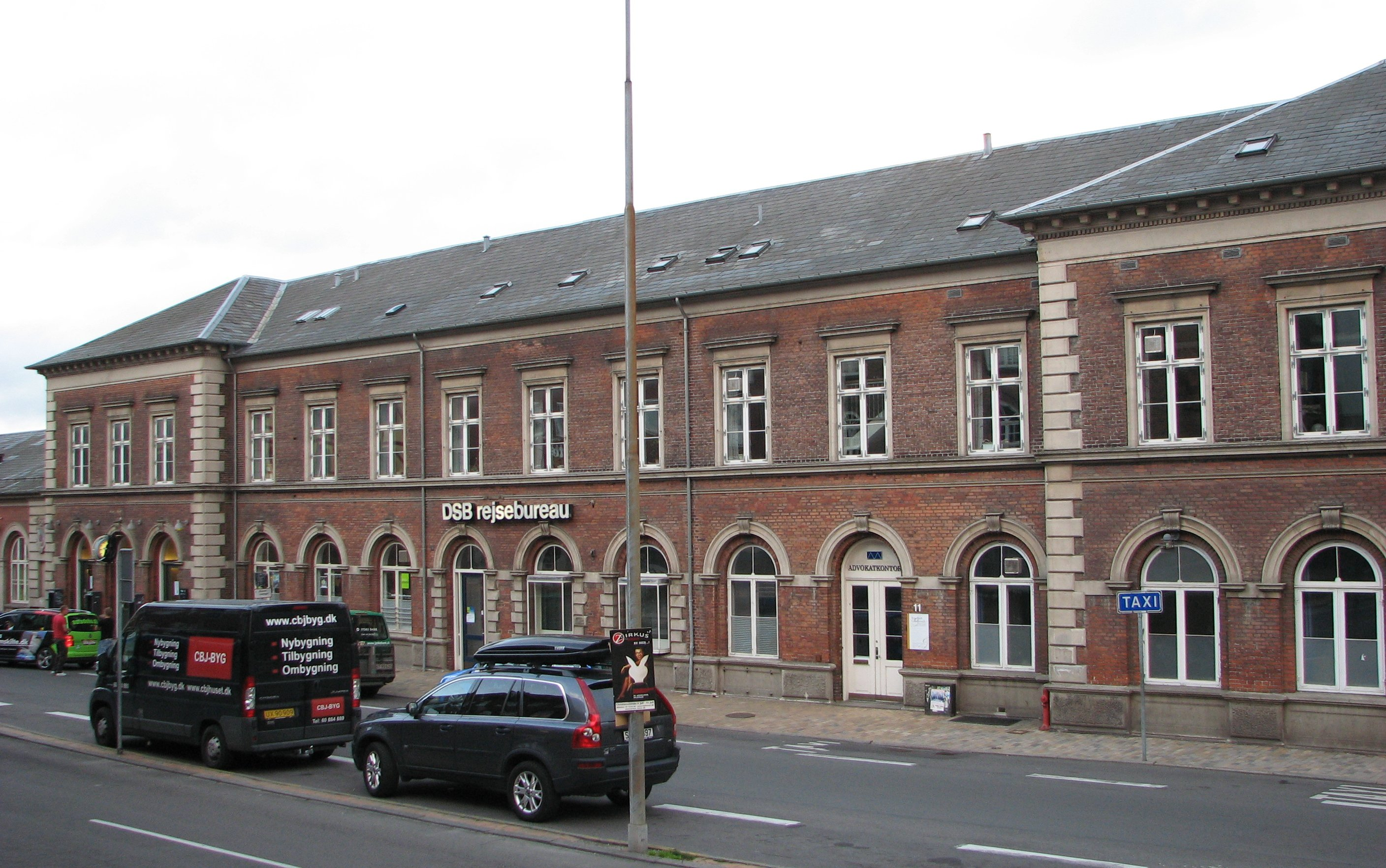
- Svendborg station in 2007

General information
- Location: Klosterplads 10; 5700 Svendborg; Svendborg Municipality; Denmark
- Coordinates: 55°03′35.32″N 10°36′44.53″E
- Elevation: 4.6 metres (15 ft)
- Owner: DSB (station infrastructure); Banedanmark (rail infrastructure)
- Line: Svendborgbanen
- Platforms: 2
- Tracks: 2
- Train operators: DSB
- Connections: Fynbus, DSB-Regional; Bus: 162, 230, 240, 241, 250, 800A, 900A

Construction
- Accessible: Yes

Other information
- Fare zone: 3

History
- Opened: 1878; 148 years ago
Location

Svendborg railway station (Danish: Svendborg Banegård og Svendborg Station) is the principal railway station serving the town of Svendborg on the island of Funen, Denmark.

The station was built in 1876 for the opening of Svendborgbanen July 12, 1876. The main building is designed by N.P.C. Holsøe. The building was opened July 10, 1878.

The station building previously contained a DSB kiosk and a DSB travel agency. The kiosk has since been converted to a 7-Eleven store. DSB tickets are available for purchase in the 7-Eleven store. There also is a Fynbus customer service center that sells bus passes. The station contains an indoor waiting area, however the travel agency no longer is in operation.

The Fynbus local city bus stop is located on the street side of the station, and the regional bus station is located on the opposite side of the tracks. Fynbus operates local and regional bus lines from Svendborg.

== Decommissioned lines ==
- Svendborg–Nyborgbanen in commission from June 1, 1897, to May 30, 1964.
- Svendborg–Faaborgbanen in commission from November 25, 1916, to May 22, 1954.
- Cargo traffic by ferry to Ærøskøbing from 1934 to 1994

== See also ==
- List of railway stations in Denmark
