= Odense–Nørre Broby–Faaborg Jernbane =

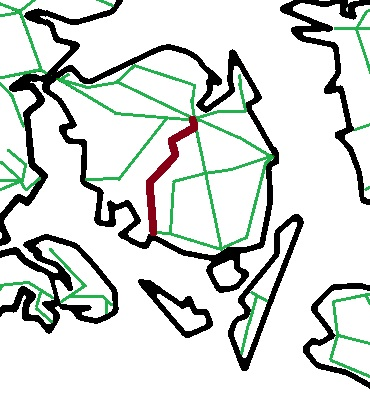
- Map of ONFJ

Overview
- Owner: Odense–Nørre Broby–Faaborg Jernbaneselskab
- Locale: Funen, Denmark
- Termini: Odense; Faaborg

Service
- Operators: SFJ (until 1949); DSB (from 1949)

History
- Opened: 2 October 1906
- Closed: 22 May 1954

Technical
- Line length: 51.3 km (31.9 mi)
- Number of tracks: Single
- Track gauge: 1,435 mm (4 ft 8 1/2 in) standard gauge
- Electrification: None

Odense–Nørre Broby–Faaborg Jernbane (ONFJ), also known as the Broby Line (Danish: Brobybanen), was a railway line connecting Odense via Nørre Broby to Faaborg on Funen, Denmark.
