= Svendborg–Faaborg Line =

Decommissioned railway in Denmark

Svendborg-Faaborgbanen
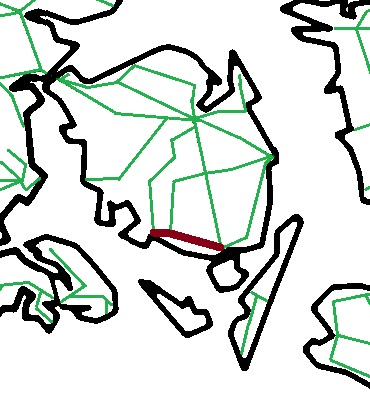
- Map of the Svendborg–Faaborg Line

Overview
- Owner: Svendborg-Faaborg Jernbaneselskab A/S
- Termini: Svendborg; Faaborg

Service
- Operators: SFJ (until 1949); DSB (from 1949)

History
- Opened: 24 November 1916
- Closed: 22 May 1954

Technical
- Line length: 26.4 km
- Number of tracks: Single
- Track gauge: 1,435 mm (4 ft 8 1/2 in)
- Electrification: None

The Svendborg–Faaborg Line (Danish: Svendborg–Faaborg Banen, abbreviated SFB) was a railway line between Svendborg and Faaborg on southern Funen, Denmark. It opened on 24 November 1916 and closed on 22 May 1954.
