= Tommerup Stationsby =

- Railway town
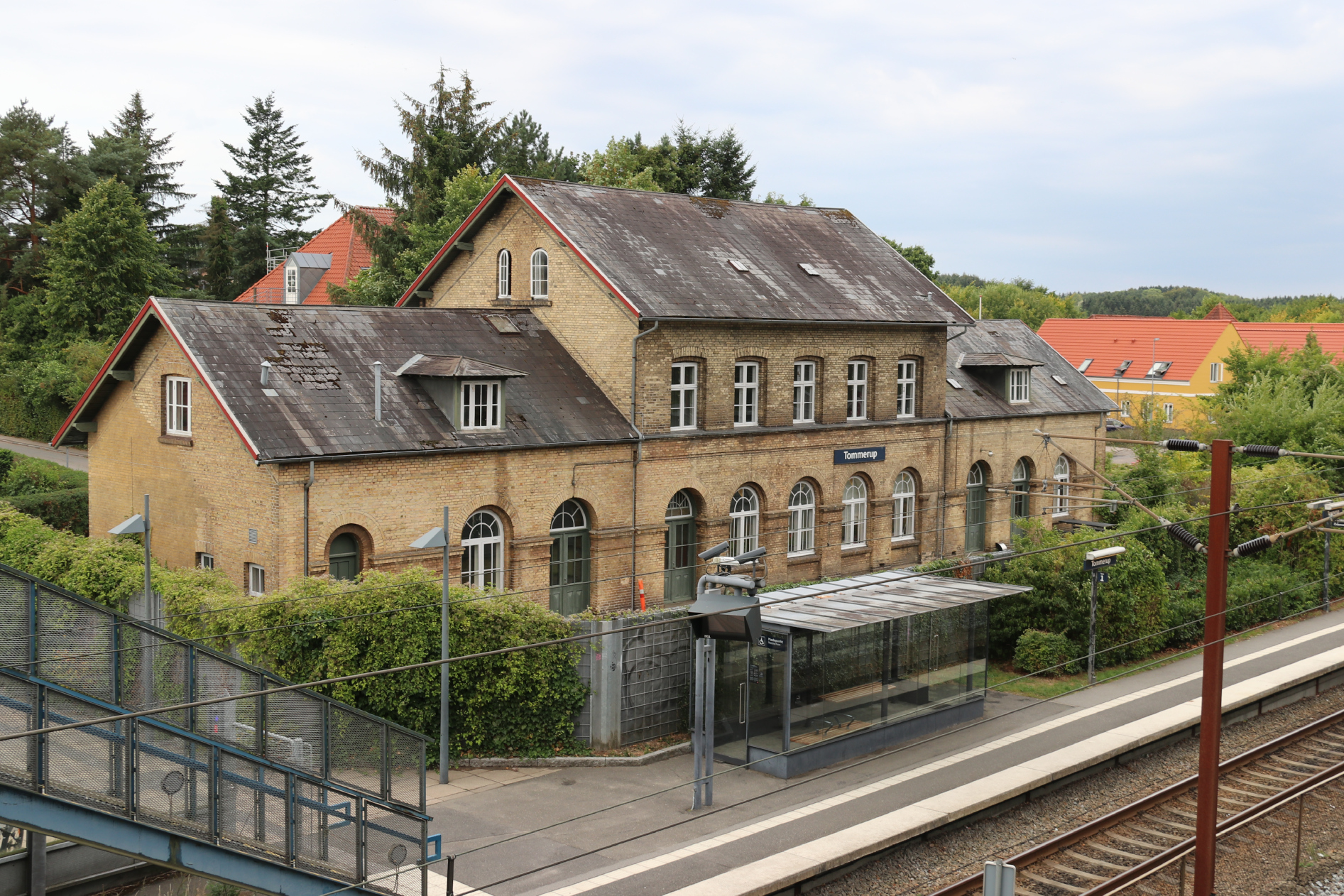
- Tommerup railway station

- Location in Denmark Tommerup Stationsby (Region of Southern Denmark)
- Coordinates: 55°20′58″N 10°10′58″E
- Country: Denmark
- Region: Southern Denmark
- Municipality: Assens Municipality

Area
  - Urban: 1.51 km^{2} (0.58 sq mi)

Population (2026)
  - Urban: 2,518
  - Urban density: 1,670/km^{2} (4,320/sq mi)
  - Gender: 1,230 males and 1,288 females
- Time zone: UTC+1 (CET)
  - Summer (DST): UTC+2 (CEST)
- Postal code: DK-5690 Tommerup

Tommerup Stationsby is a town on the island of Funen, Denmark. Its population numbered 2,518 as of January 2026.

== Economy ==
Most villagers work in the more urbanised areas. Cattle are raised. Tommerup is home to a stone factory. Because of clay shortages, this factory mainly produces specialized ceramic products, such as a vase, five metres high, which was exhibited at the World's Fair in Sevilla, in 1992.

== History ==
In 1996, Tommerup Stationsby declared itself Cultural Village of Europe. In 1999, it became part of the European network known as Cultural Villages of Europe.

== Transport ==
A train station in Tommerup, run by DSB offers departures once an hour for Fredericia, and on to cities such as Aalborg and Aarhus.

One departure/hour travels to the third biggest city in Denmark, Odense, which offers service to Copenhagen.
