= Sydfyenske Jernbaner =

Det sydfyenske Jernbaneselskab
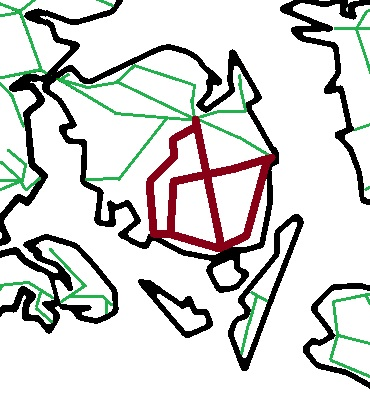
- Map of railways of Funen in Denmark with the private railway, Sydfyenske Jernbaner, in brown.
- Type: Aktieselskab
- Industry: Railways
- Founded: May 28, 1874; 152 years ago in Ringe
- Defunct: April 1, 1949
- Successor: DSB

Det sydfyenske Jernbaneselskab A/S (lit. 'The Railway Company of South Funen'), also known as Sydfyenske Jernbaner (SFJ, lit. 'Railways of South Funen'), was a Danish railway company that operated in southern Funen.

The company was originally created to operate the Odense–Svendborg Line, also known as "Den sydfyenske Jernbane". SFJ would later operate a number of other lines under lease (Danish: forpagtning): the Ringe–Faaborg Line (later extended to Nyborg) from 1882, the Svendborg–Nyborg Line from 1902,, the Odense–Nørre Broby–Faaborg Line from 1906, and the Svendborg–Faaborg Line from 1916.

SFJ's assets were transferred to the Danish State Railways (DSB) on 1 April 1949, and the company was liquidated.
