= Frodesen =

Frodesen is a Norwegian surname. Notable people with the surname include:

- Fredrik Frodesen Sand (1846–1919), Norwegian shipmaster, farmer, and politician
- Lars Frodesen (1889–1921), Danish writer and philosopher
- Leiv Frodesen (1900–1985), Norwegian editor and translator
