= Kaldager =

Kaldager is a Norwegian surname. Notable people with the surname include:

- Christian Roy Kaldager (1908–2005), Royal Norwegian Air Force major general
- Hans Kristian Kaldager (1864–1944), Norwegian farmer and politician
- Ola Kaldager (born 1946), Norwegian officer
