= Thorsten Mauritsen =

Danish climate scientist

- Occupation: Scientist
- Known for: Department of Meteorology at Stockholm University

Thorsten Mauritsen (born 1977) is a Danish climate scientist. He is currently a professor at the Department of Meteorology at Stockholm University. His research interests include climate dynamics and global circulation, climate sensitivity and cloud feedbacks and ocean-atmosphere coupled problems. He is best known for his research on Earth's equilibrium climate sensitivity and his research uses the climate of the past to determine climate sensitivity more precisely.

== Biography ==
He was born in Sønderborg and studied physics and meteorology at the University of Copenhagen and Stockholm University. He received his PhD in Stockholm in 2007. He then joined MPI-M as a postdoctoral researcher, and eventually became a group leader at the institute.

He has been cited around 10,000 times. His h-index is 44 as of 2021.
