= Sønderborg =

Sønderborg Sonderburg (German)
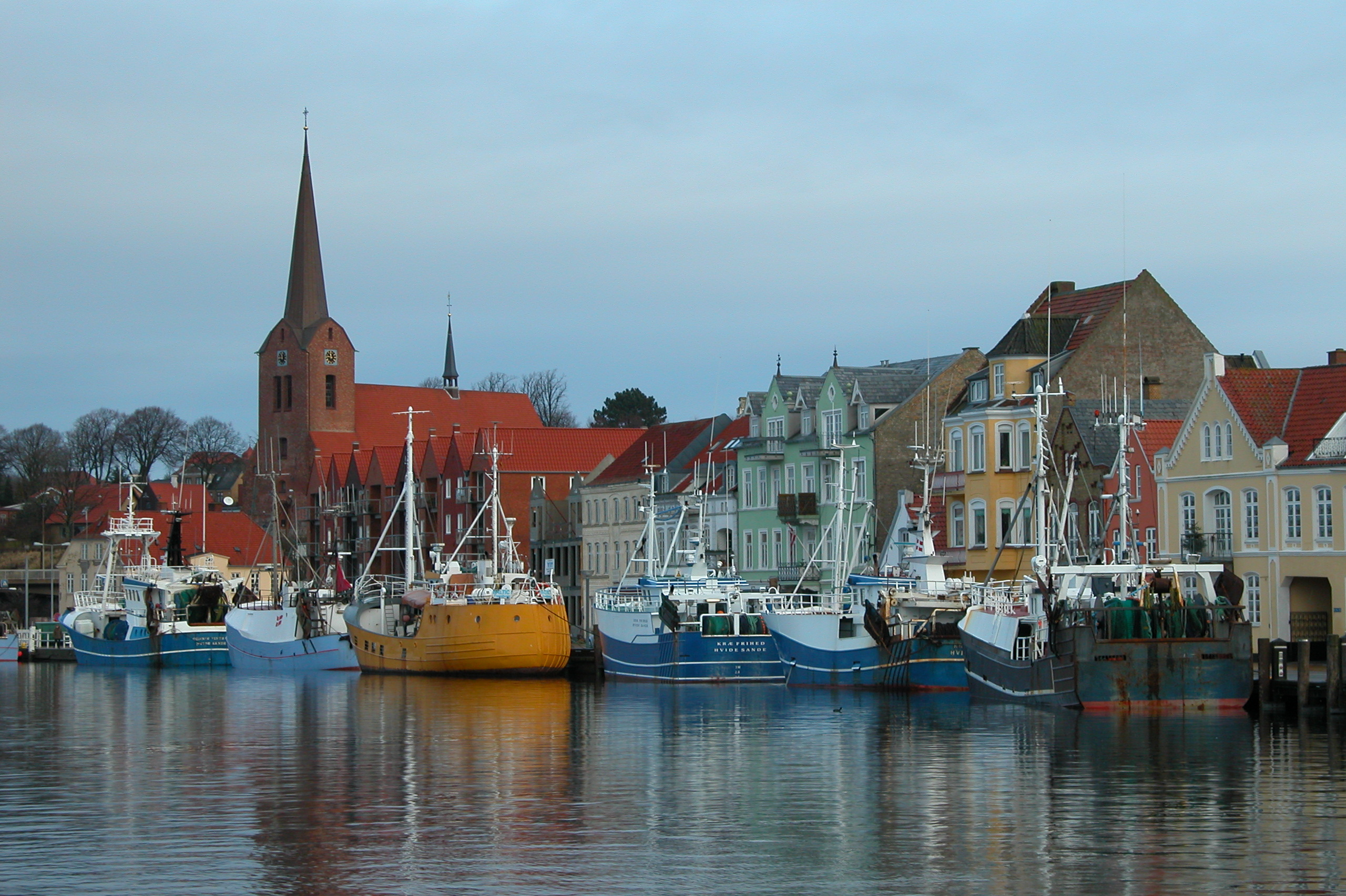
- Harbour

- Coat of arms

- Location in Denmark Sønderborg (Region of Southern Denmark)
- Coordinates: 54.91382°N 9.79225°E
- Country: Denmark
- Region: Southern Denmark (Syddanmark)
- Municipality: Sønderborg
- Founded: 1256

Government
  - Mayor: Eric Lauritzen

Area
  - Urban: 13.4 km^{2} (5.2 sq mi)
- Elevation: 17 m (56 ft)

Population (2026)
  - Urban: 28,564
  - Urban density: 2,130/km^{2} (5,520/sq mi)
  - Gender: 14,326 males and 14,238 females
  - Municipality: 74,123
- Demonym: Sønderborgenser Sønderborger
- Time zone: UTC+1 (Central Europe Time)
  - Summer (DST): UTC+2
- Postal code: DK-6400 Sønderborg
- Area code: (+45) 88
- Website: sonderborg.dk/en

Sønderborg (Danish pronunciation: [ˈsønɐˌpɒˀ]; German: Sonderburg [ˈzɔndɐbʊʁk]) is a Danish town in the Region of Southern Denmark. It is the main town and the administrative seat of Sønderborg Municipality (Kommune). The town has a population of 28,564 (1 January 2026), in a municipality of 74,123. In recent times, Sønderborg is a center for trade, tourism, industry, and education in the region of Southern Denmark. The town is the headquarters for several industrial companies. Sønderborg joined the UNESCO Global Network of Learning Cities in 2016.

== Overview ==
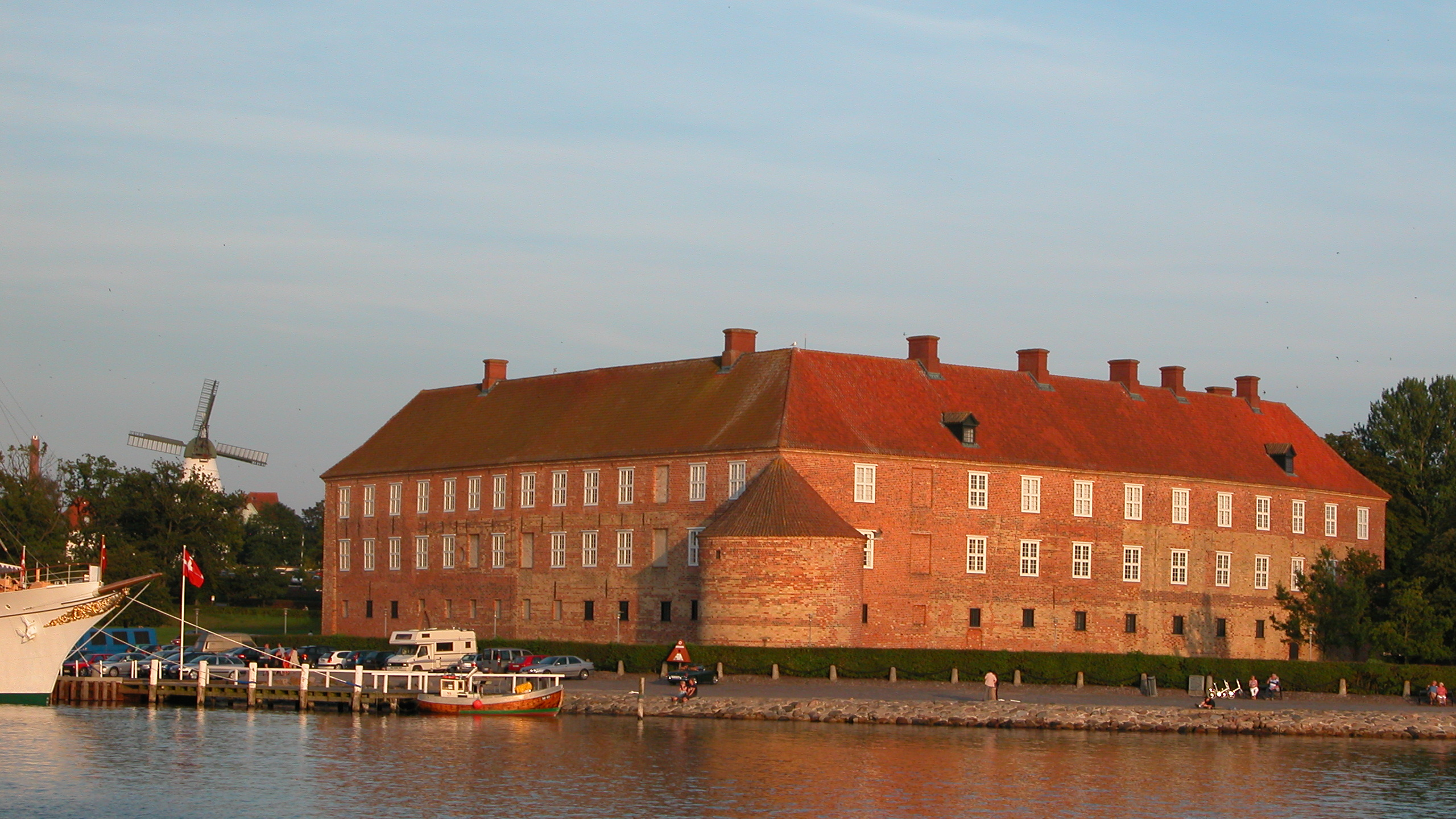
Sønderborg Castle

The town of Sønderborg is home to Sønderborg Castle (Sønderborg Slot), the Royal Danish Army's Sergeant School (until 2013) and Sandbjerg Estate (Sandbjerg Gods). Sønderborg castle is in the centre of the town, and houses a museum focusing on the history and culture of the area. The museum is open all year. Sandbjerg Estate, which had belonged for many years to the Dukes of Sønderborg, and then to the Reventlow family, was donated to Aarhus University in 1954. In addition, Sønderborg has a castle-like barracks built by the German military in 1906, placed centrally by Als Fjord, opposite Alsion (see picture below).

The old part of Sønderborg is located on the island of Als, but some of its western suburbs have spread onto the mainland of Jutland into what had been the interior of the fort of Dybbøl.

== History ==
Prior to the Second Schleswig War of 1864, Sønderborg was situated in the Duchy of Schleswig, a Danish fief, so its history is properly included in the contentious history of Schleswig-Holstein. In the 1920 Schleswig Plebiscite that returned Northern Schleswig to Denmark, 43.8% of the city of Sønderborg's inhabitants voted for the cession to Denmark and 56.2% voted for remaining part of Germany.

== Geography ==
Sønderborg (lower left) is on the Als Strait in Denmark, southwest of Copenhagen, north of the German border.

The town of Sønderborg lies on both sides of Alssund; the narrow strait between these two sides is called Als Strait (Alssund). Two road bridges connect the city across the strait: the 682-meter-long (2,238 ft) Alssund Bridge (Alssundbroen), built in 1978–1981; and the 331-meter (1,086 ft) King Christian X's Bridge (Kong Christian Xs Bro), built in 1925–1930.

Climate data for Sønderborg (2011-2021)
Month	Jan	Feb	Mar	Apr	May	Jun	Jul	Aug	Sep	Oct	Nov	Dec	Year
Record high °C (°F)	11.7 (53.1)	13.4 (56.1)	19.6 (67.3)	22.8 (73.0)	26.1 (79.0)	29.8 (85.6)	31.2 (88.2)	31.4 (88.5)	27.0 (80.6)	25.0 (77.0)	17.3 (63.1)	12.5 (54.5)	31.4 (88.5)
Mean daily maximum °C (°F)	4.5 (40.1)	4.3 (39.7)	6.6 (43.9)	10.6 (51.1)	15.3 (59.5)	18.9 (66.0)	20.8 (69.4)	20.8 (69.4)	17.7 (63.9)	13.5 (56.3)	9.2 (48.6)	6.6 (43.9)	12.4 (54.3)
Daily mean °C (°F)	2.4 (36.3)	2.2 (36.0)	4.1 (39.4)	7.5 (45.5)	11.8 (53.2)	15.5 (59.9)	17.4 (63.3)	17.6 (63.7)	15.0 (59.0)	11.2 (52.2)	7.2 (45.0)	4.5 (40.1)	9.7 (49.5)
Mean daily minimum °C (°F)	0.3 (32.5)	0.0 (32.0)	1.6 (34.9)	3.4 (38.1)	8.4 (47.1)	12.1 (53.8)	14.1 (57.4)	14.5 (58.1)	12.3 (54.1)	9.0 (48.2)	5.2 (41.4)	2.4 (36.3)	6.9 (44.5)
Record low °C (°F)	−11.8 (10.8)	−17.5 (0.5)	−11.0 (12.2)	−5.4 (22.3)	−2.3 (27.9)	2.9 (37.2)	5.8 (42.4)	5.2 (41.4)	1.4 (34.5)	−3.0 (26.6)	−5.4 (22.3)	−14.7 (5.5)	−17.5 (0.5)
Source: Danish Meteorological Institute (humidity 1978–1997)

== Education ==
=== Higher education ===
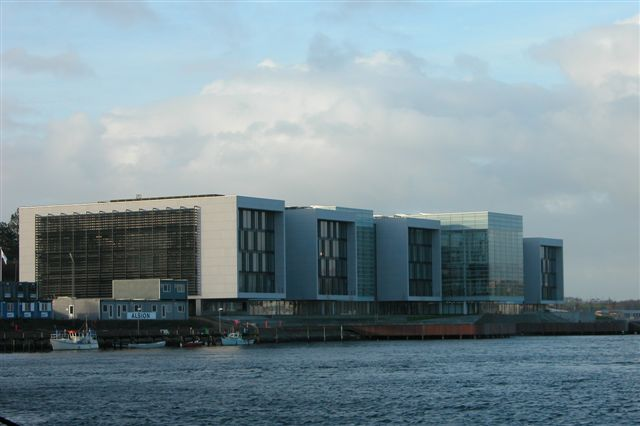
University of Southern Denmark

Sønderborg hosts several institutions of higher education. the University of Southern Denmark, University College South (Danish: University College Syd), and Business Academy SouthWest. Due to the local economy, the University of Southern Denmark offers several types of degrees in engineering such as: mechatronics; electronics; innovation and business; as well as degrees in economics, languages and European studies.

=== Secondary education ===
The technical school EUC Syd has a campus in Sønderborg, and offers a variety of trades programs, as well as the HTX high school diploma and the International Baccalaureate Diploma program.

== Economy ==
Sønderborg is an economic hub in the region of Southern Denmark, with industries within electronics, manufacturing, food processing, Information Technology and telecommunications among others, with several companies headquartered in and around the town.

The high-tech industry includes the manufacturing and development of electronics, machines, industrial equipment, and software. Companies of major importance in the high-tech sector headquartered in the region include Danfoss who employs around 1000 people in Sønderborg, and 40,000 people globally. Linak, headquartered in Nordborg 25 km from Sønderborg, produces linear actuators for a variety of different applications, from agriculture to healthcare, and employs around 1,100 people in the region. Maersk container industries(MCI), a part of the Maersk group, manufactures refrigerated and refrigeration machines shipping containers, has its headquarters in Sønderborg.

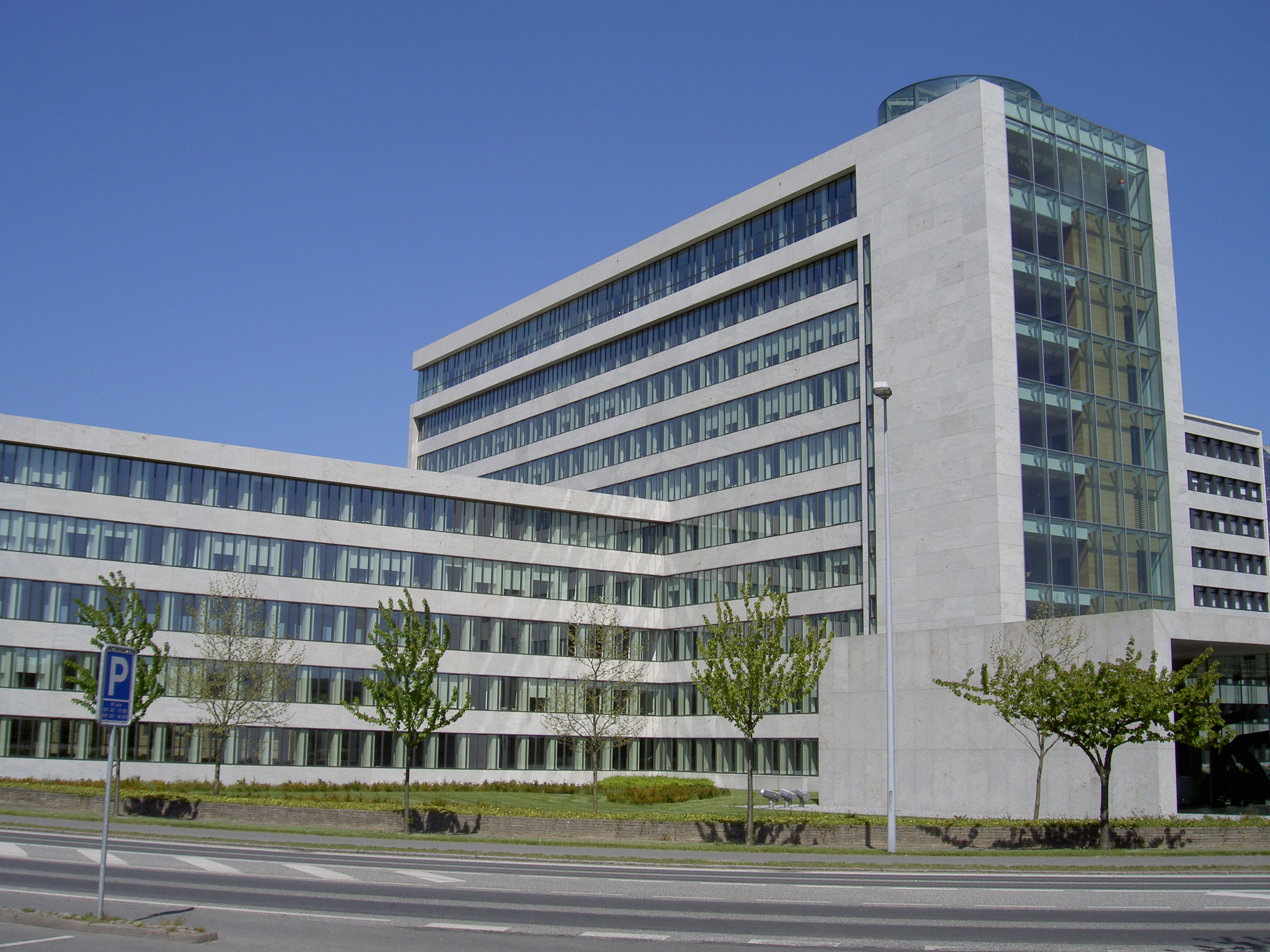
Danfoss headquarters (in Nordborg)

The food processing and meat packing group, Danish Crown has a slaughterhouse located in the town of Blans, outside of Sønderborg. The slaughterhouse produces pork and meat products for consumption, and employs around 940 people. BHJ is a leading supplier of animal proteins for the international food and pet food industries, with headquarters in Gråsten, outside of Sønderborg and more than 900 employees worldwide.

In telecommunications, TDC A/S operates a callcenter employing roughly 370 employees. In August 2014, TDC planned to outsource around 700 full-time positions to American company Sitel, by 2015.

Skyways technics, an aircraft service and repair company is headquartered at Sønderborg Airport and has 150 employees in Sønderborg and Billund. Saab AB also has offices in the town, mainly focused on sales and engineering.

== Transportation ==
=== Rail ===
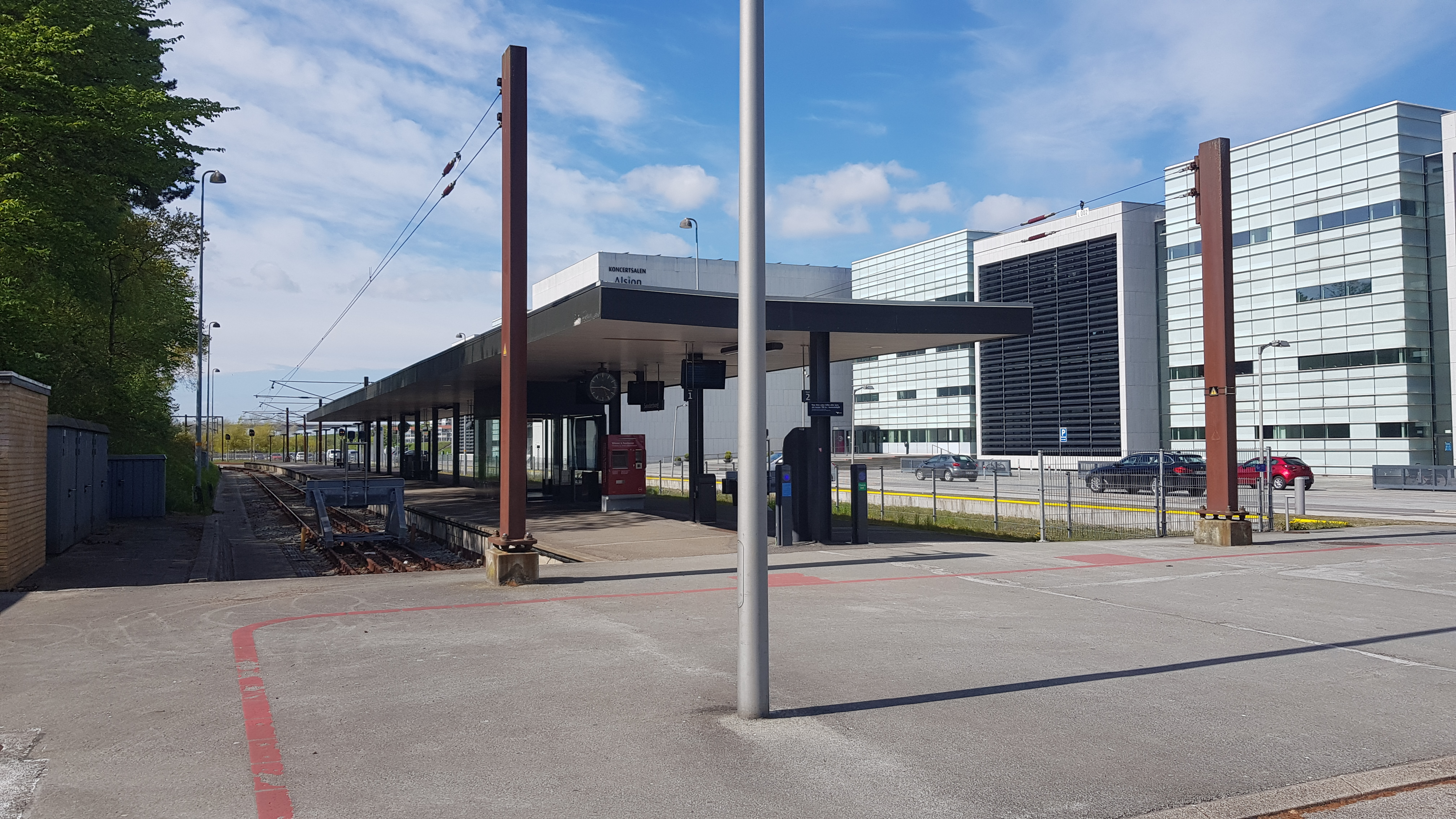
Sønderborg railway station

Sønderborg is served by Sønderborg railway station, which opened in 1901, and is located next to Alsion. It is the eastern terminus of the Sønderborg railway line which connects Sønderborg with Tinglev and the rest of the Danish rail network. Sønderborg station offers frequent direct services to Fredericia and Copenhagen, as well as a direct InterCity service to Copenhagen Airport.

=== Air ===
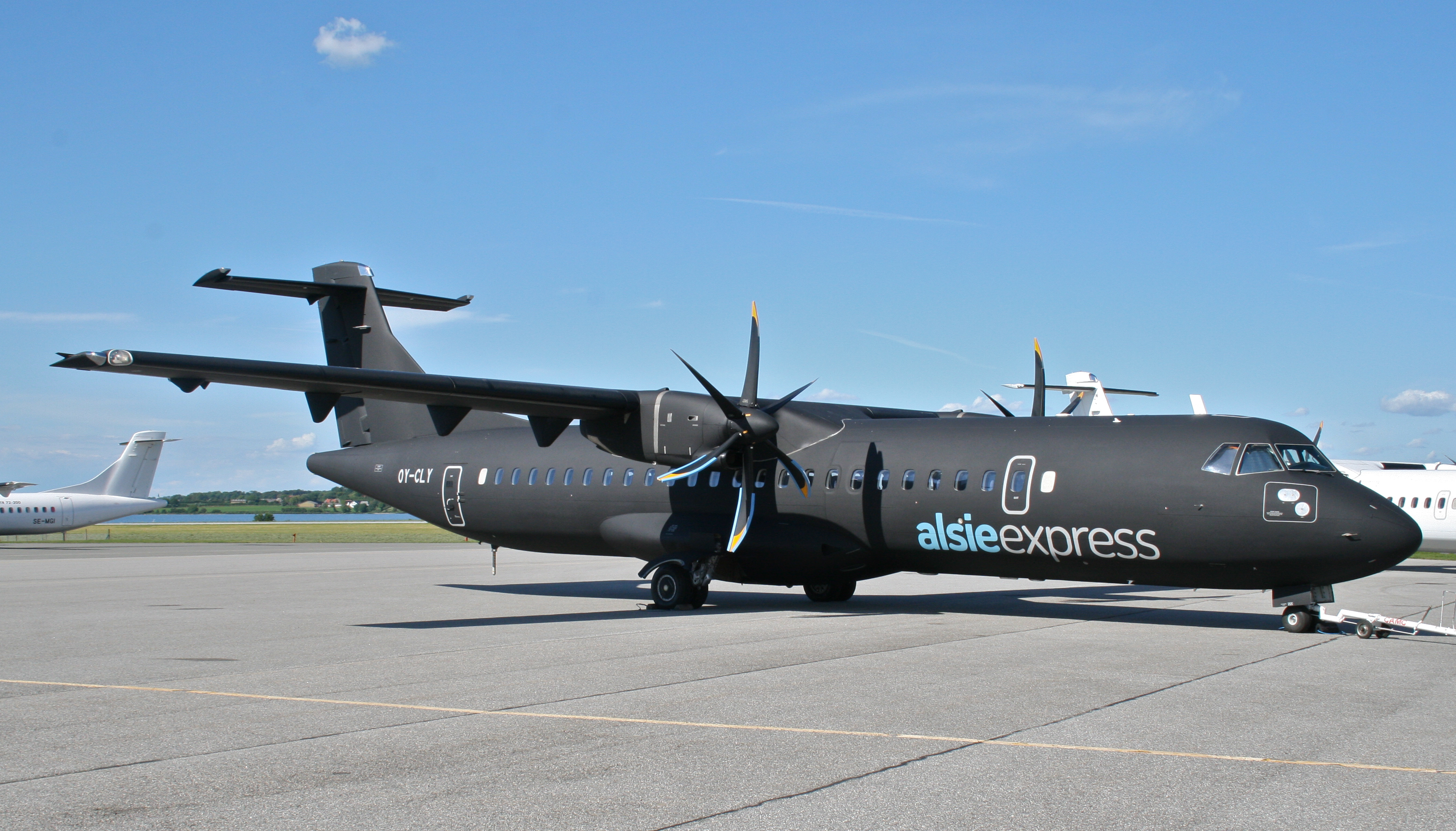
Alsie Express airplane

The city is served by Sønderborg Airport. The airline, Alsie Express provides flights directly to Copenhagen and seasonal flights to destinations such as Bornholm and Naples.

=== Ferry ===
Molslinjen operates daily ferry services from Fynshav to Bøjden on the island of Funen, with roads connecting the town to Odense and further to Zealand and Copenhagen.

== Notable natives ==
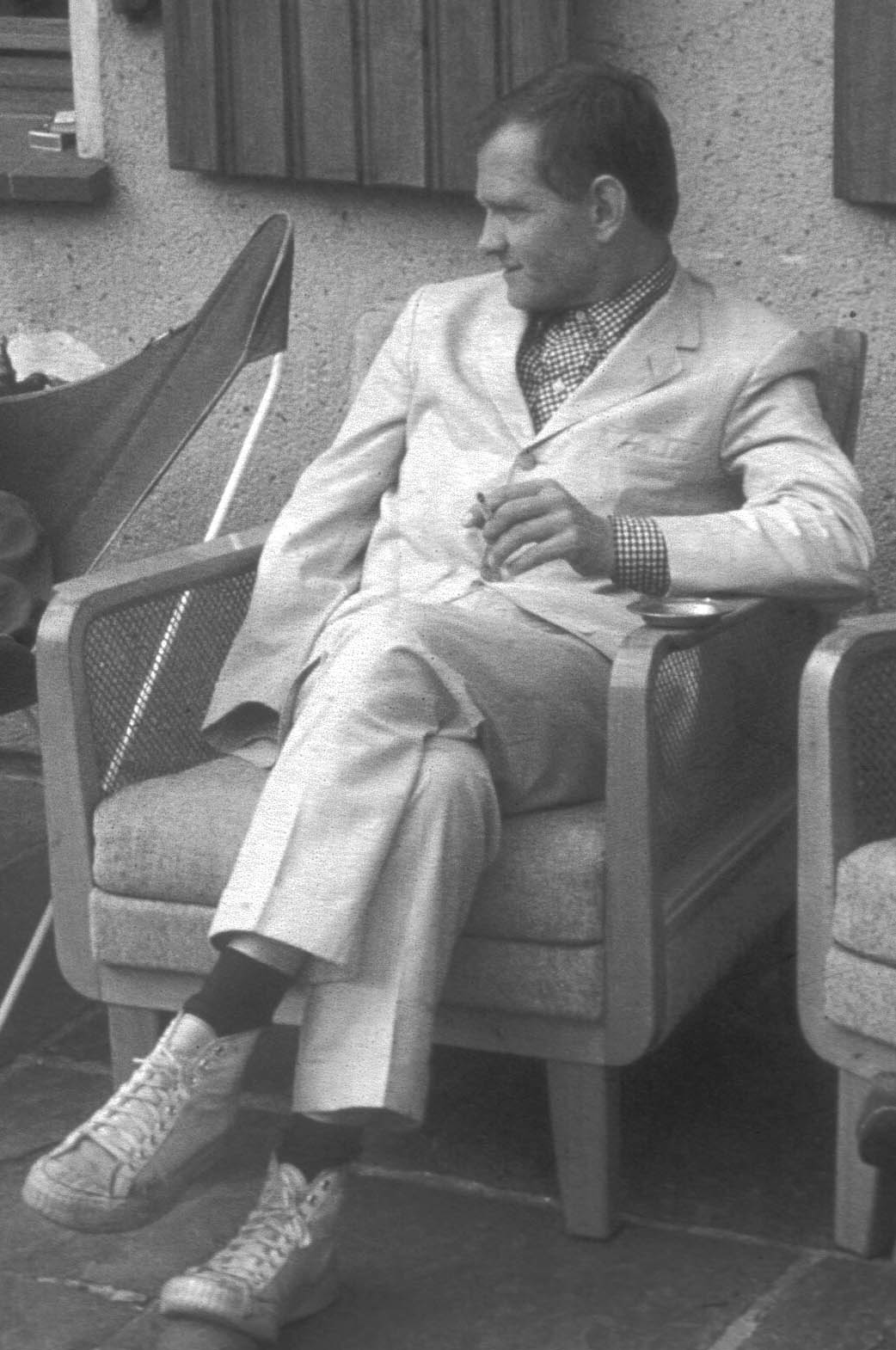
KRH Sonderborg, 1962

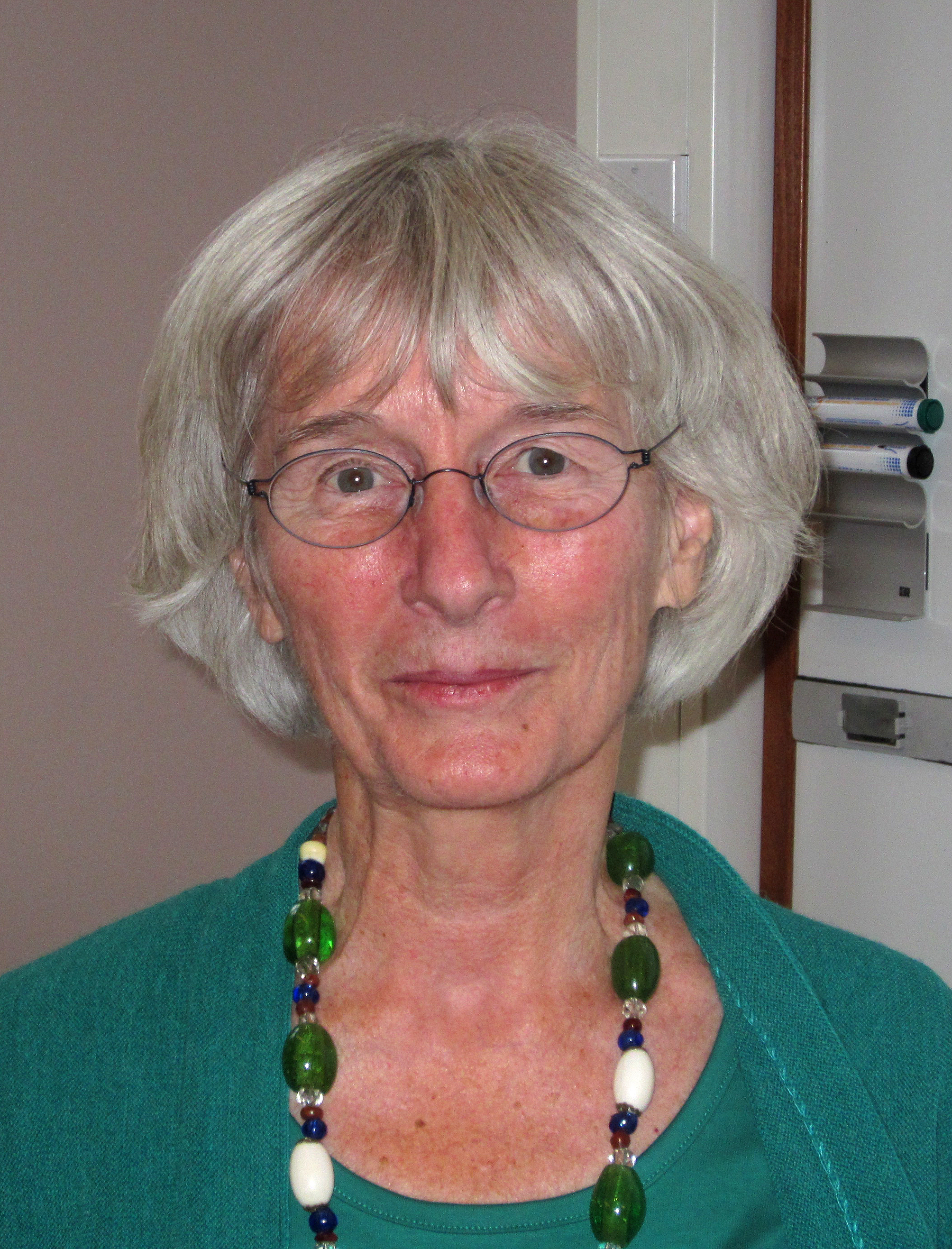
Else Roesdahl, 2012

=== The Arts ===
- Christian August Lorentzen (1749 in Sønderborg – 1828) a Danish painter and instructor of Martinus Rørbye
- Herman Bang (1857 in Asserballe – 1912) an author, of the Modern Breakthrough
- Kamma Svensson (1908 in Sønderborg – 1998) a Danish illustrator, contributed to Politiken
- K.R.H. Sonderborg (1923 in Sønderborg – 2008) a new media artist and musician.
- Johannes Carstensen (1924 in Sønderborg – 2010) a neo-impressionistic Odsherred painter
- Per Nielsen (born 1954 in Sønderborg) a popular Danish trumpet player
- Søren Solkær (born 1969 in Sønderborg) a Danish photographer
- Sune Rose Wagner (born 1973 in Sønderborg) a songwriter, guitarist and vocalist, playing in the rock group The Raveonettes

=== Public thinking and public service ===
- Baron Otto Grote zu Schauen (1636/1637 in Sønderborg – 1693) an Hanoverian statesman
- Lars Frodesen (1889 in Sønderborg – 1921) a writer and philosopher, heavily inspired by Blaise Pascal
- Frode Kristoffersen (1931–2016), journalist and politician
- Else Roesdahl (born 1942 in Sønderborg) a historian, educator and archaeologist
- Vibeke Vasbo (born 1944 in Tandslet) a writer and women's rights activist
- Ralf Pittelkow (born 1948 in Sønderborg) a commentator on both radio and TV
- Tom Buk-Swienty (born 1966) a historian, journalist and author, raised in Sønderborg
- Lisbeth Bech Poulsen, (Danish Wiki) (born 1982 in Sønderborg) politician, member of the Danish folketing for Socialistisk Folkeparti

=== Science and business ===
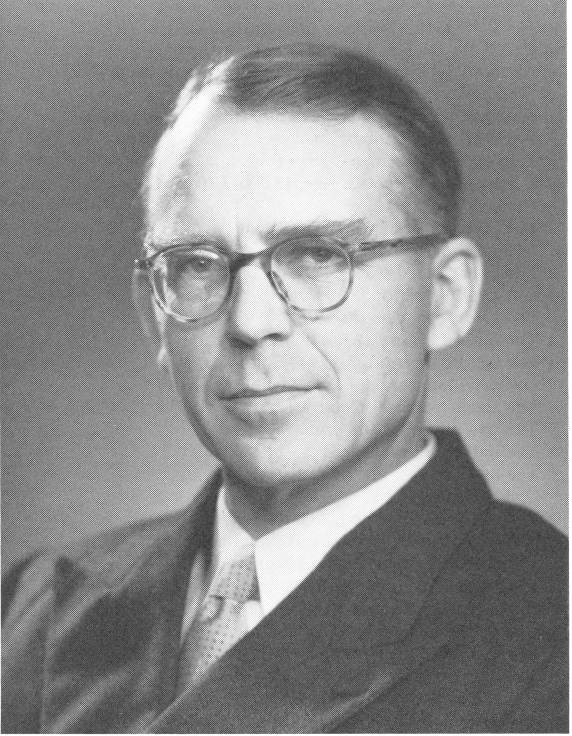
Johannes Iversen, 1955

- Westye Egeberg (1770 in Sønderborg – 1830) a Danish-Norwegian timber and lumber businessman
- Jakob Nielsen (1890 in Mjels – 1959) a mathematician, worked on automorphisms of surfaces
- Johannes Iversen (1904 in Sønderborg – 1972) a Danish palaeoecologist
- Peder Moos (1906 in Sønderborg – 1991) a Danish furniture designer and cabinetmaker
- Jørgen Mads Clausen (born 1948 in Elsmark) Chairman of the board of Danfoss
- Lothar Göttsche (born 1961 in Sønderborg) a German mathematician, works on algebraic geometry
- Niels Christiansen (born 1966 in Sønderborg) a Danish businessman, CEO of Lego
- Jens Martin Skibsted (born 1970 in Sønderborg) a Danish designer, entrepreneur and author
- Thorsten Mauritsen (born 1977 in Sønderborg) a Danish climate scientist

=== Sport ===
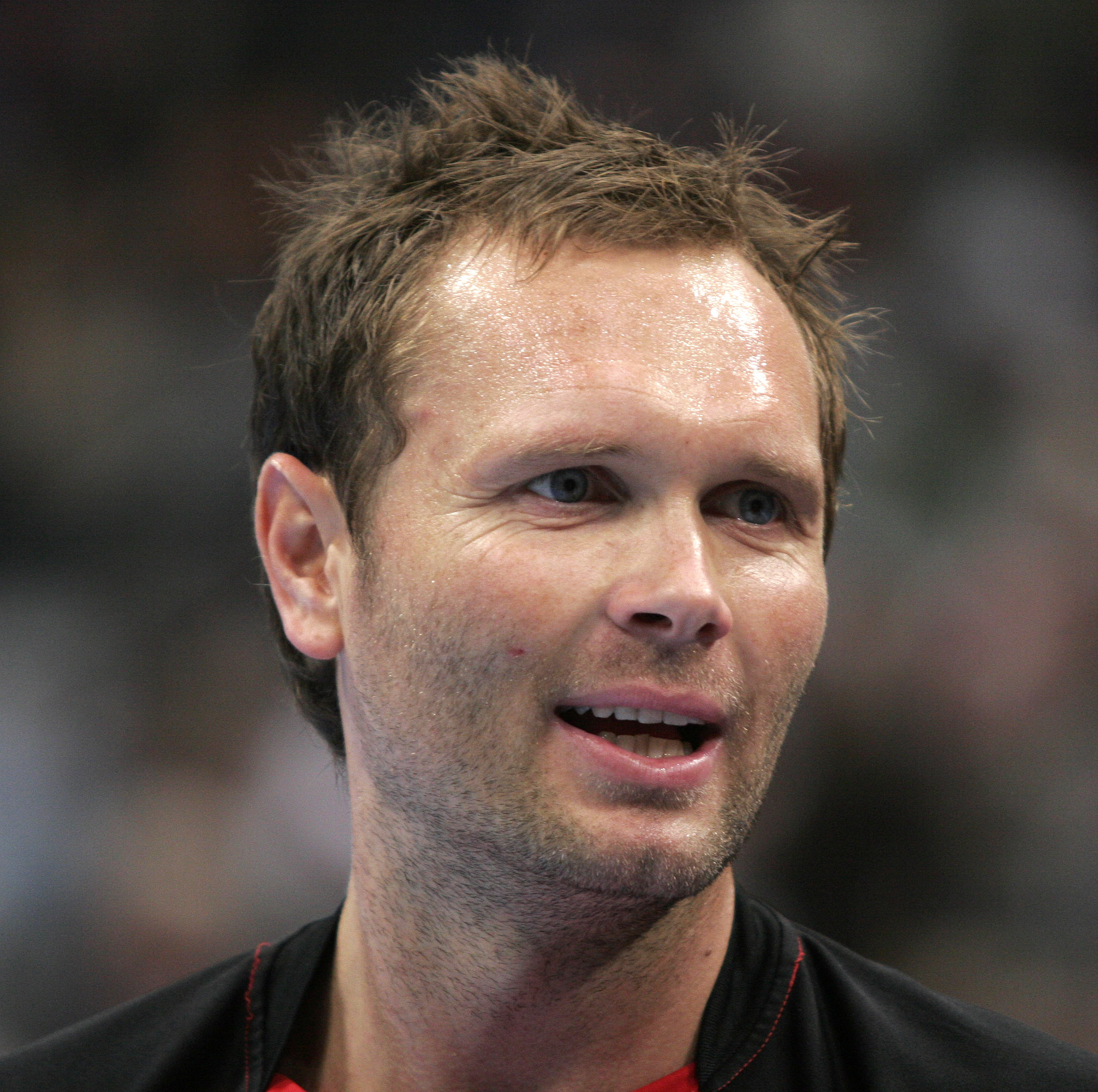
Lars Christiansen, 2007

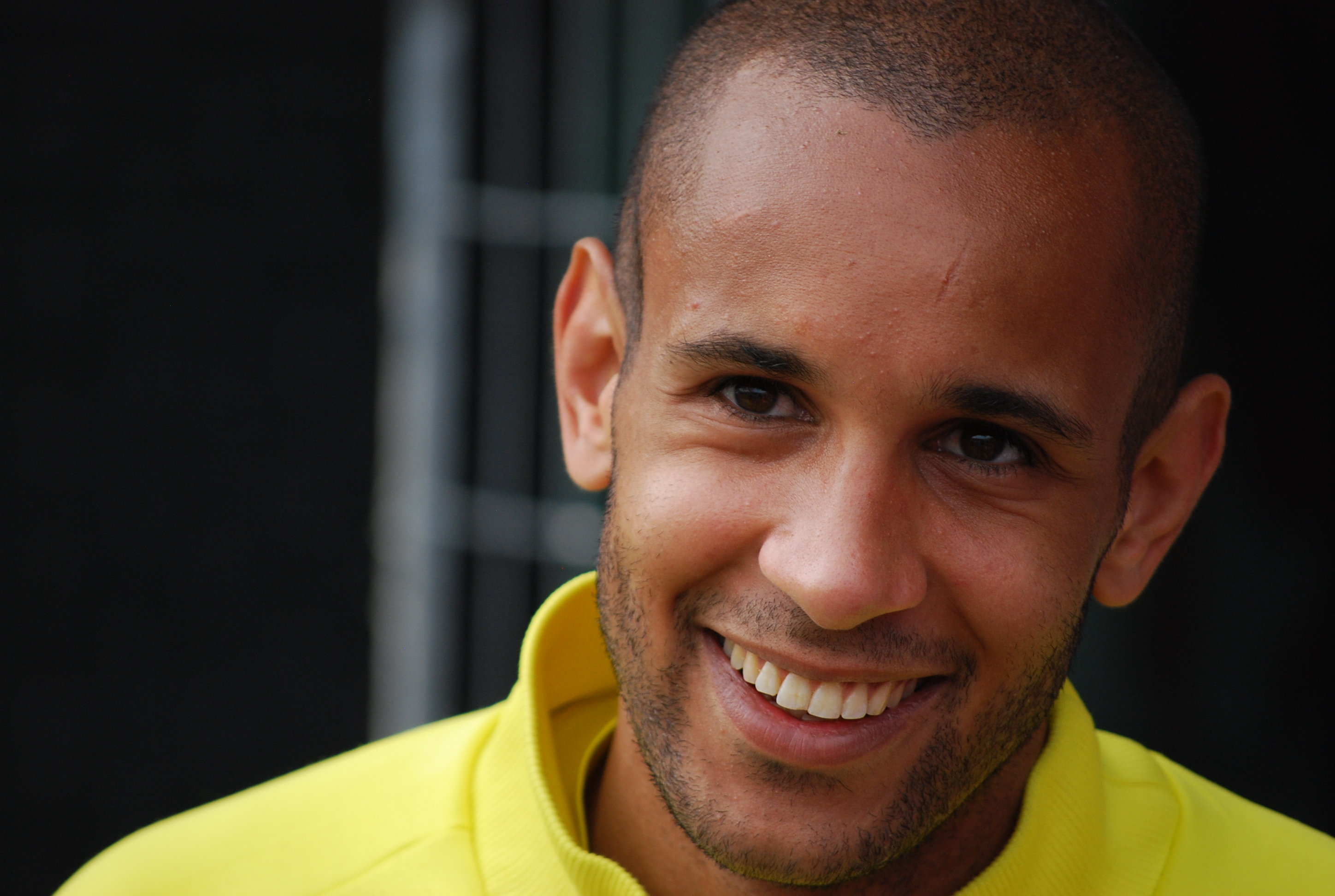
Simon Poulsen, 2011

- Ludvig Drescher (1881 in Sønderborg – 1917) an amateur football goalkeeper, team silver medallist at the 1908 Summer Olympics
- Verner Blaudzun (born 1946 in Sønderborg) a former cyclist, team bronze medalist at the 1976 Summer Olympics
- Palle Jensen (born 1953 in Sønderborg) former handball player, competed in the 1976 and 1980 Summer Olympics
- Michael Søgaard (born 1969 in Sønderborg) a Danish badminton player
- Anders Hansen (born 1970 in Sønderborg) a semi-retired Danish professional golfer.
- Lars Christiansen (born 1972 in Sønderborg) a former team handball player, played 338 games for the Denmark men's national handball team
- Simon Poulsen (born 1984 in Sønderborg) a footballer, 31 caps with the Denmark national football team
- Nicki Thiim (born 1989 in Sønderborg) a professional Danish race-car driver
- Sara Keçeci (born 1994 in Sønderborg) a Turkish-Danish female handball goalkeeper
- Daniel Bachmann Andersen (born in 1990 in Sønderborg) a Danish equestrian athlete

=== Other ===
The formerly ruling family of Schleswig-Holstein-Sonderburg married into Kings and Queens

== Panoramic view ==
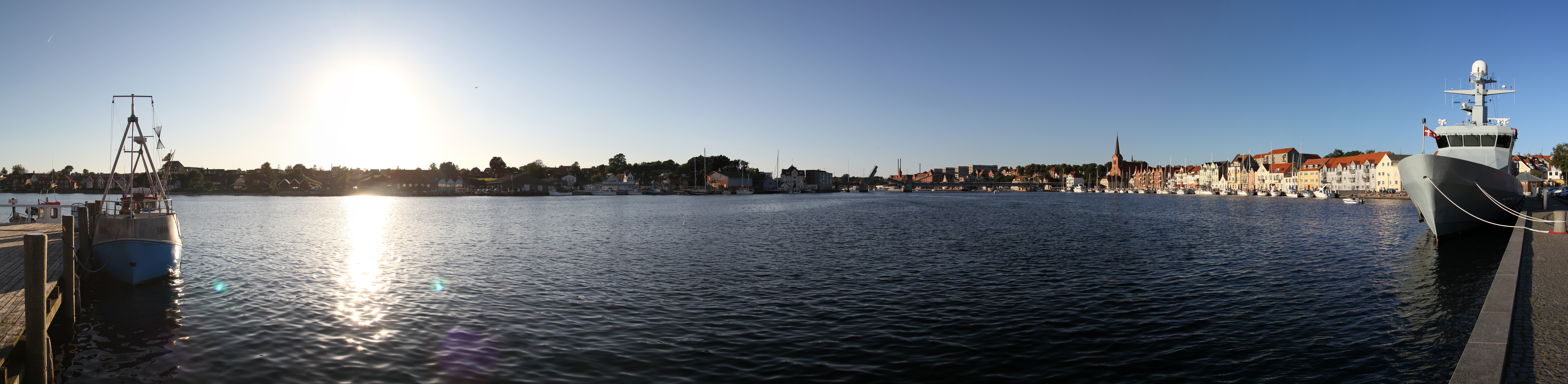
Panoramic photo taken from Sønderborg Castle towards the harbour.

== Culture ==
=== Musical institutions ===
Sønderborg is home to the South Jutland Symphony Orchestra Sønderjyllands Symfoniorkester.

=== Attractions ===
Sønderborg Castle is today a museum about the history of Southern Denmark. The science park Universe (earlier known as Danfoss univers) is located just north of Sønderborg.

== In literature ==
In Chapter 4 of Erskine Childers’ 1903 novel The Riddle of the Sands, the protagonists, two English yachtsmen, visit Sonderburg, then under German rule: "Fascinating Sonderburg, with its broad-eaved houses of carved woodwork, each fresh with cleansing, yet reverend with age; its fair-haired Viking-like men and rosy, plain-faced women, with their bullet foreheads and large mouths; Sonderburg still Danish to the core under its Teuton veneer. Crossing the bridge I climbed the Dybbol – dotted with memorials of that heroic defence – and thence could see the wee form and gossamer rigging of our yacht on the silver ribbon of the Sound. (...) In the old quarter I bargained over eggs and bread with a dear old lady, pink as a debutante, who made a patriotic pretence of not understanding German."
