= Sønderborg Line =

Railway line in Denmark

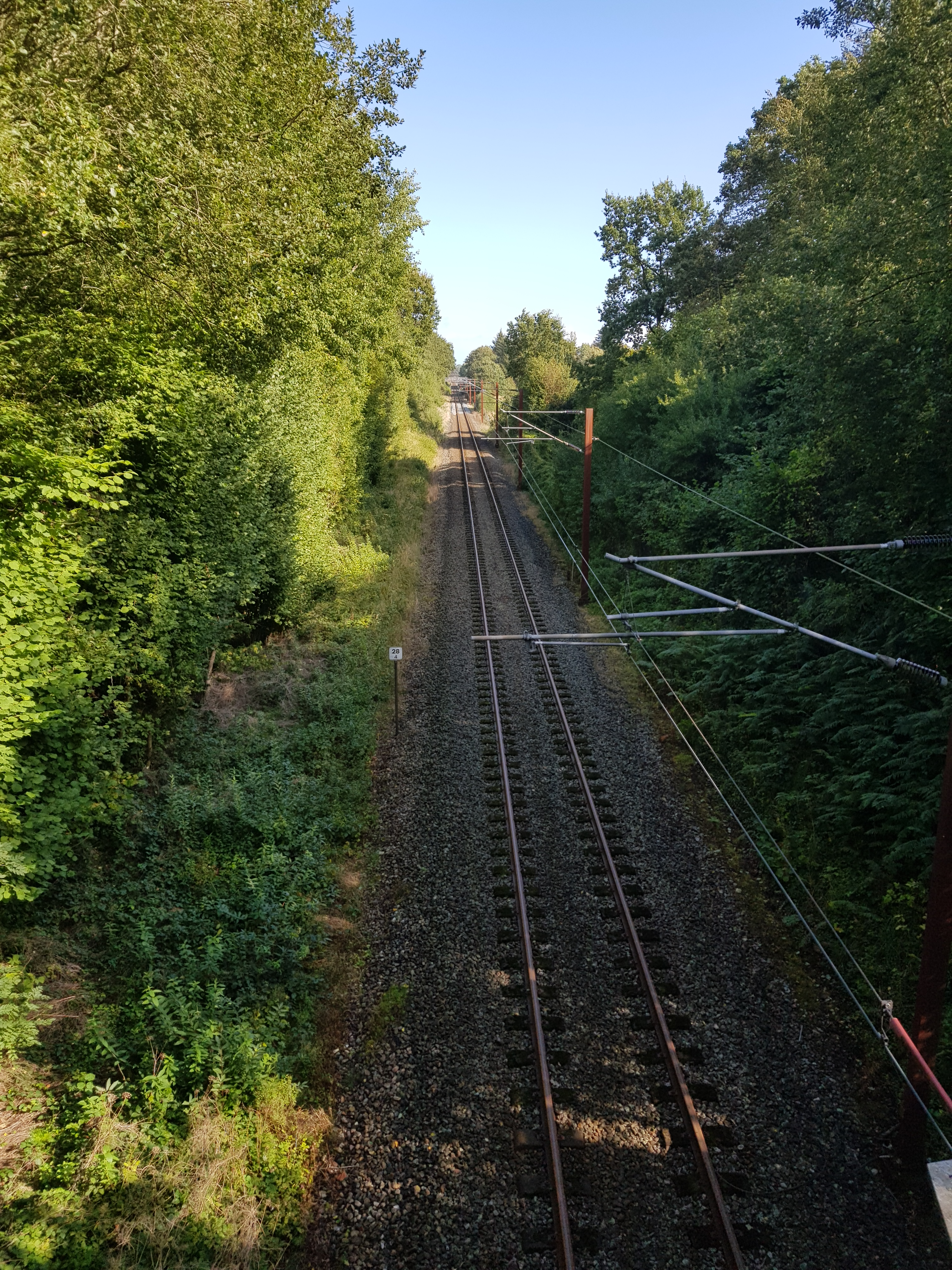
- The Tinglev–Sønderborg railway line in Søgård Skov in 2019

Overview
- Native name: Sønderborgbanen
- Status: Operational
- Owner: Banedanmark
- Line number: 28
- Termini: Tinglev; Sønderborg
- Stations: 4

Service
- Type: Heavy rail
- System: Danish railway
- Operator(s): DSB

History
- Opened: 15 July 1901

Technical
- Line length: 42.0 km (26.1 mi)
- Number of tracks: Single track
- Character: Passenger trains
- Track gauge: 1,435 mm (4 ft 8 1/2 in) standard gauge
- Operating speed: 100 km/h
The Tinglev–Sønderborg railway line
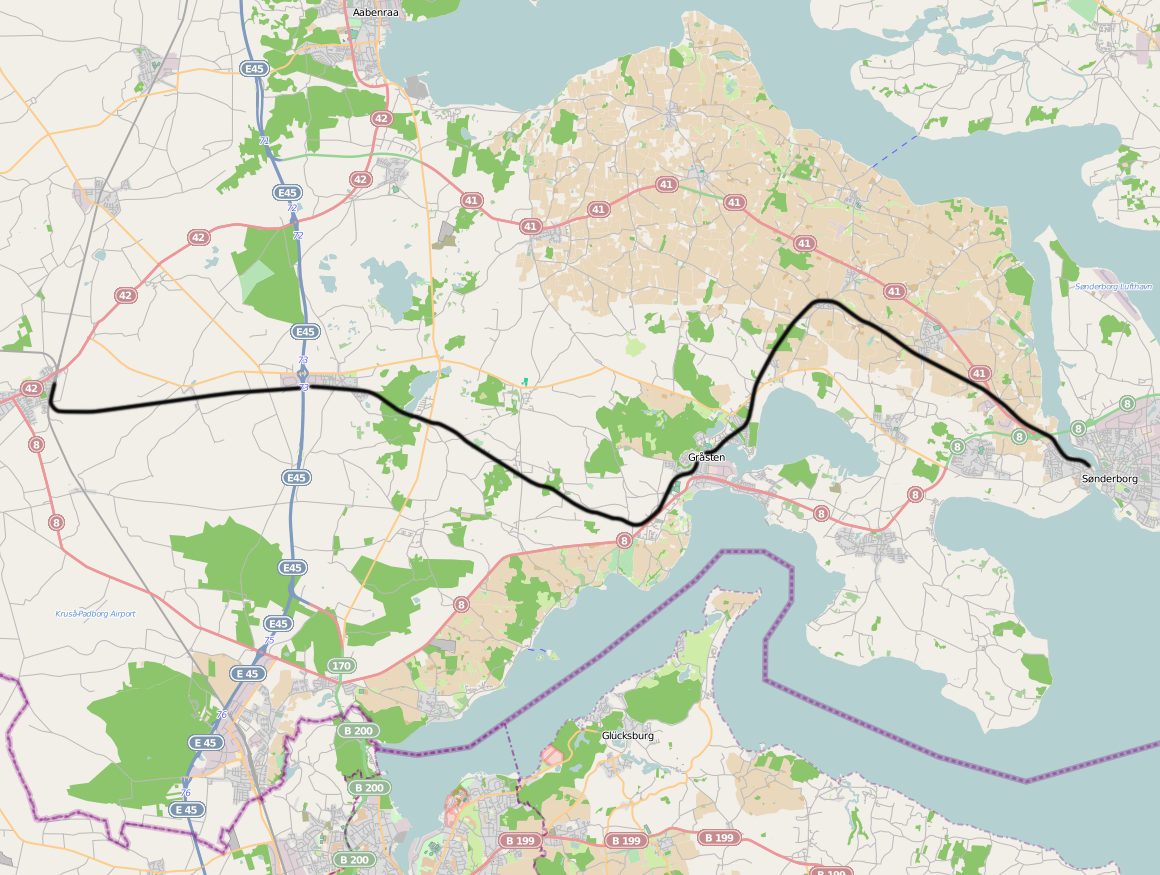

The Sønderborg railway line (Danish: Sønderborgbanen), also known as the Tinglev–Sønderborg railway line (Danish: Tinglev–Sønderborg-banen) is a 41.2 kilometres (25.6 mi) long branch line in Southern Jutland, Denmark which runs between the towns of Tinglev and Sønderborg. The railway line links Sønderborg with the Fredericia–Padborg railway line and the rest of the Danish rail network at Tinglev. The standard gauge railway line is single track and electrified.

== History ==
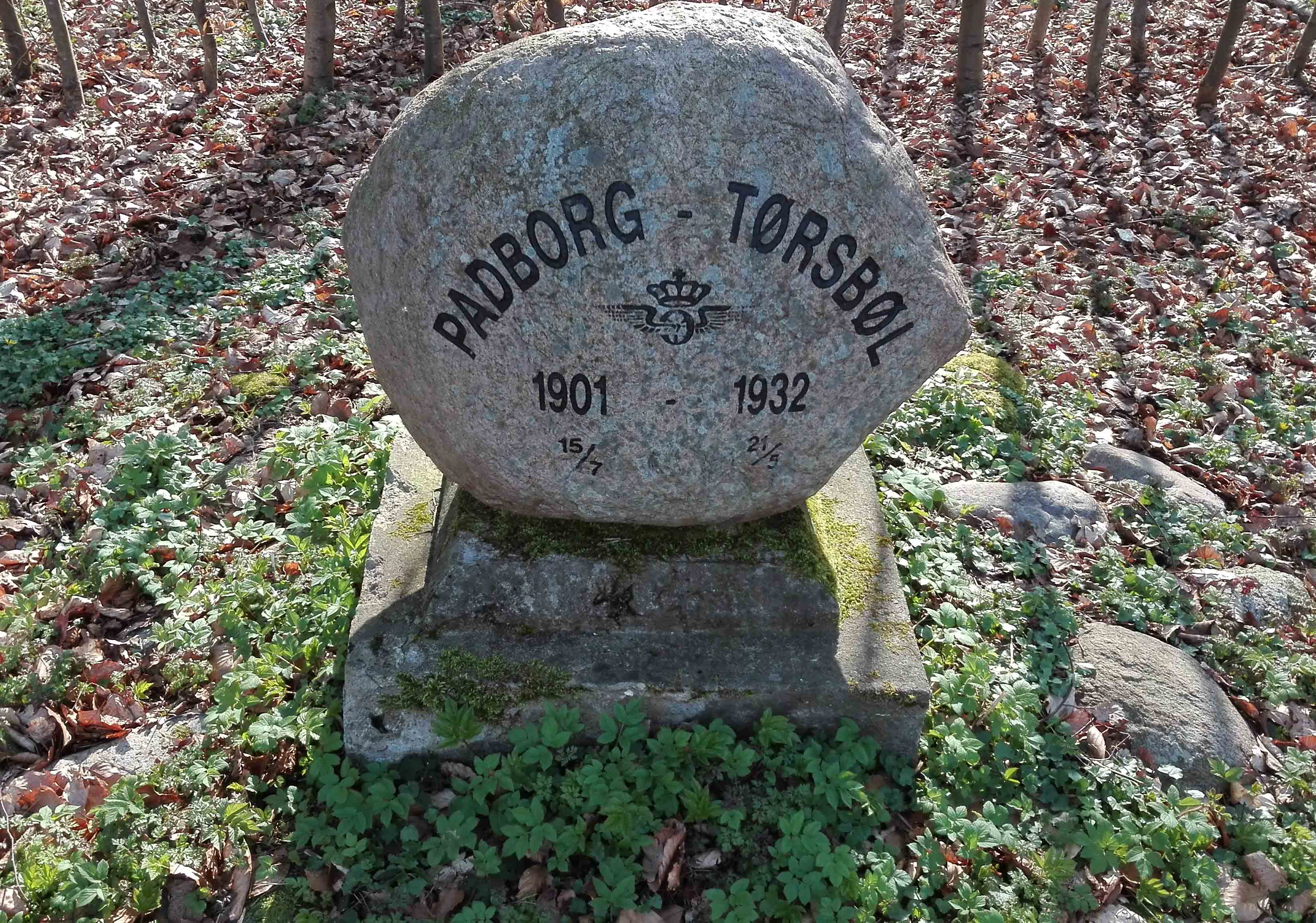
Memorial to the Tørsbøl–Padborg branch line in Tørsbøl.

The railway line was built during the period when the area belonged to the German Empire. On July 15 1901, the line was put into operation by the Prussian state railways. At the opening, the primary line connected Sønderborg with Padborg via Tørsbøl, with a branch line from Tørsbøl to Tinglev.

After the 1920 Schleswig plebiscites, the area became part of the Kingdom of Denmark, and the railway line was taken over by the Danish State Railways (DSB). Subsequently, the branch line from Tørsbøl to Tinglev became the primary line, whereas the line from Tørsbøl to Padborg became a branch line, and was closed in 1932.

In 1997, the railway line was electrified.

== Stations ==
- Tinglev, connection with the Fredericia–Padborg railway line to Fredericia and Padborg
- Kliplev
- Gråsten
- Sønderborg

== See also ==
- List of railway lines in Denmark
- Rail transport in Denmark
- History of rail transport in Denmark
