= Sønderborg railway station =

Railway station in Sønderborg, Denmark

Sønderborg
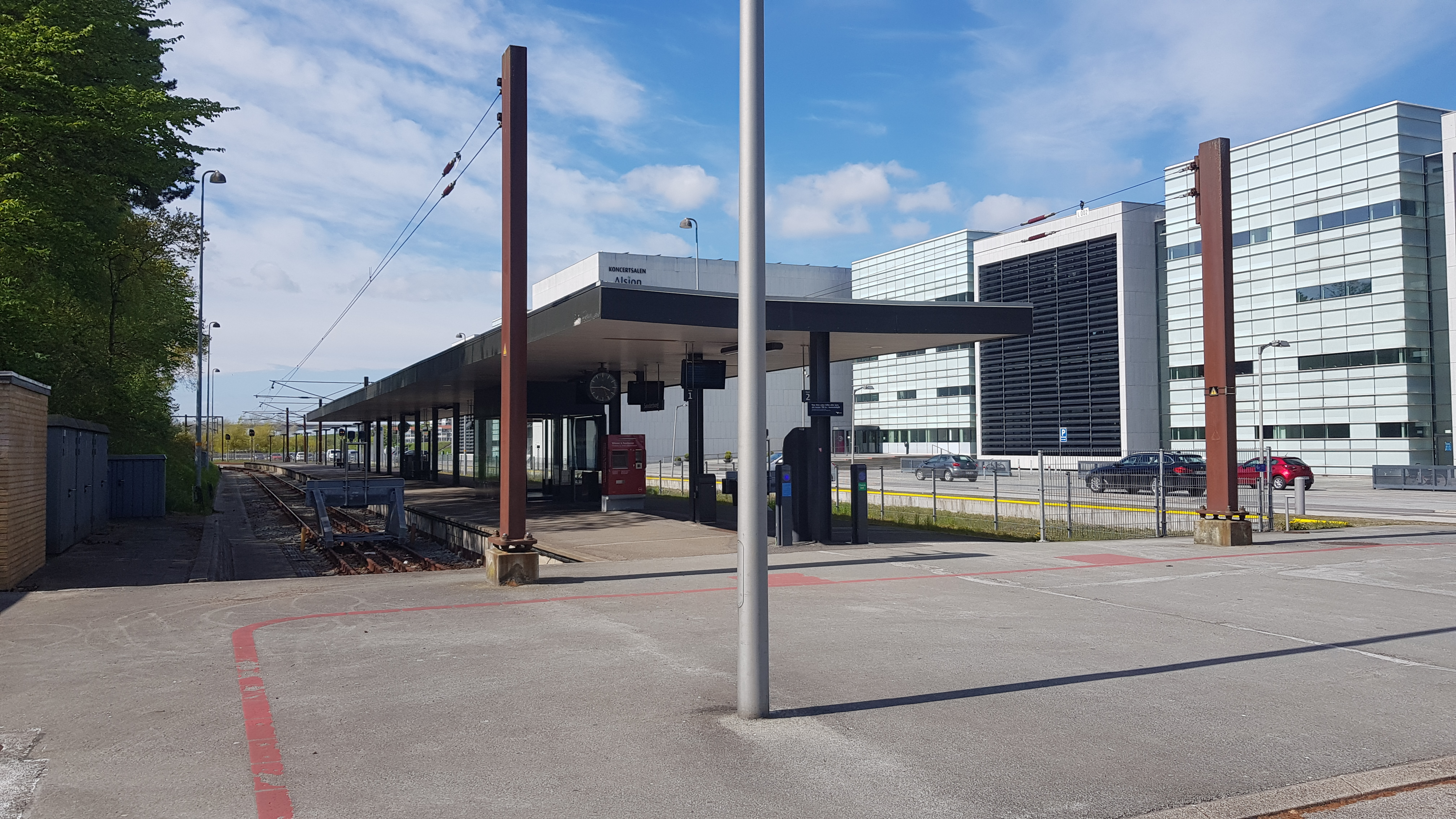
- Sønderborg station in 2020

General information
- Location: Alsion 1; 6400 Sønderborg; Sønderborg Municipality; Denmark
- Coordinates: 54°54′45″N 9°46′43″E
- Elevation: 6.9 metres (23 ft)
- Owner: DSB (station infrastructure); Banedanmark (rail infrastructure)
- Line: Tinglev–Sønderborg
- Platforms: 1
- Tracks: 2
- Train operators: DSB

History
- Opened: 15 June 1901
- Rebuilt: 1967; 2004

Services
Preceding station	DSB	Following station
Gråsten towards Copenhagen Airport	Copenhagen-Sønderborg InterCityLyn	Terminus
Location

Sønderborg station (Danish: Sønderborg Banegård or Sønderborg Station, previously Sønderborg H) is a railway station serving the city of Sønderborg in Southern Jutland, Denmark. The station is located on the west side of the Alssund, next to the Alsion science and culture centre.

Sønderborg station is the eastern terminus of the Tinglev–Sønderborg railway line, which connects it to the Fredericia–Padborg railway line and the rest of the Danish rail network at Tinglev. The station opened in 1901. It offers frequent direct InterCity services to Kolding, Odense and Copenhagen.

== See also ==
- List of railway stations in Denmark
- Rail transport in Denmark
