= Lars Frodesen =

Danish writer and philosopher

- Born: 1889; Sønderborg, Syddanmark, Denmark
- Died: 1921 (aged 31–32); Denmark
- Occupations: Writer, philosopher
- Writing career
- Notable work: Om planter og gartnere
- Literary movement: Modern Breakthrough

Lars Frodesen (1889–1921) was a Danish writer and philosopher from Sønderborg, in Syddanmark. Having been heavily inspired by Blaise Pascal he mainly wrote pessimistic novels, and published essays on modern philosophy and philosophical anthropology. Frodesen's most important work Om planter og gartnere is an exploration of relations between pedagogy, literature, art, and nature. The goal of forming a human being in the process of upbringing is, he claims, creating a person, who thanks to her openness to experiences, is ready to live a life which has a structure mimicking that of the work of literature. Some scholars consider Frodesen's works on Spinoza and modern idealism, to be an anticipation, of the ideas of Arthur Lovejoy, contained within The great chain of being. Frodesen was an avid critic of the Modern Breakthrough, many of his works represent conservative stances, although he considered himself an "apolitical defeatist". Frodesen gained minuscule attention for his writings in the late 1910s, though after his death of pneumonia in 1921, much of his work was forgotten. During the Nazi occupation of Denmark his books and papers were considered "Entartete" and subsequently much of his literary legacy was destroyed.
