= Hans Kristian Kaldager =

Norwegian politician

Hans Kristian Kaldager (21 October 1864 – 7 December 1944) was a Norwegian farmer and politician for the Conservative Party.

He was born in Vaale Municipality as a son of farmers. He took over the family farm Kaldager in 1891.

Kaldager served as a member of the municipal council of Våle Municipality from 1899 to 1934, including two periods as mayor, 1908 to 1925 and 1929 to 1931. He sat on the county council (at that time a college of mayors), the county school board, the county electricity committee, oversaw the construction of the Lier Asylum, sat on the supervisory council of the Vestfold Line from 1922 to 1934 and was a savings bank director.

In the 1909 Norwegian parliamentary election, he won the single-member constituency Skoger and served as an MP from 1910 to 1912. His deputy was F. F. Sand. Kaldager later returned to be elected for a second and third time from Vestfold in 1924 and 1927. He served on the Standing Committee on Customs and in the Lagting, and also sat on the Impeachment Court in 1926–27 during the impeachment trial against Berge's Cabinet. In July 1926 Kaldager was awarded the King's Medal of Merit in gold.

Kaldager married a farmers' daughter from Sande i Vestfold, Anna Kirstine Berg. He died in December 1944.
