= Fredrik Frodesen Sand =

Norwegian politician (1846–1919)

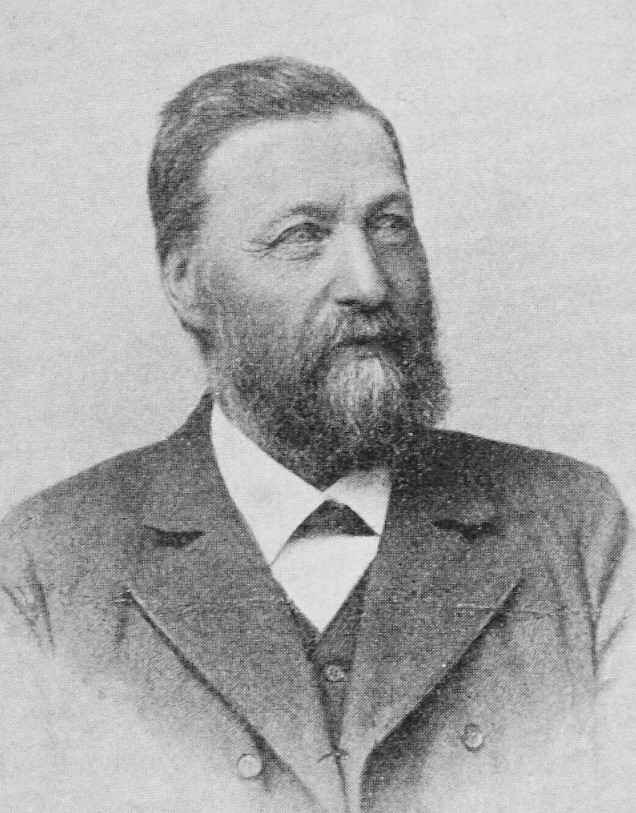
Fredrik Frodesen Sand in 1905-1910

Fredrik Frodesen Sand (24 January 1846 – 1919) was a Norwegian shipmaster, farmer and politician for the Free-minded Liberal Party.

== Early life ==
He was born in Strømm. His father was a maritime pilot in the area between Strømm to Rødtangen, and F. F. Sand took the shipmaster's exam in Drammen in 1866. Sand sailed for several years before moving to the United States. Here, he sailed for a few years on "the lakes", before venturing to Texas where he was a railroad contractor and foreman.

== Career ==
In 1878 he moved back to Norway, purchasing Imhjelt in Skoger Municipality. He was a savings bank director and served 27 years on the municipal council, including 6 years as mayor.

Sand was elected as a deputy representative to the Parliament of Norway from the single-member constituency in 1906 and 1909. The first time, he fielded as a Coalition Party candidate for a joint ticket with the Liberal Party, being the running mate of Sven Aarrestad. In 1909, Sand had joined the new Liberal Left Party and ran on a joint ticket of the Conservative and Liberal Left parties with Hans Kristian Kaldager as the main candidate. Sand met in parliamentary session for considerable parts of the first term.

== Personal life ==
Sand was married twice. He died in 1919. He should not be confused with district physician Fredrik Sand who died in 1919 as well.
