= Hack-Tic =

Dutch magazine (1989–1994)

Hack-Tic was a Dutch hacker magazine published between 1989 and 1994. It had a cult following and upset authorities beyond the Dutch borders.

== History ==
In 1988, a small delegation from the Chaos Computer Club in Hamburg visited Amsterdam after being invited by Caroline Nevejan, who organized political events at Paradiso in Amsterdam. Rop Gonggrijp, the magazine's later editor and publisher was at that point already rather well known as a hacker who sometimes appeared in the newspapers. Being inspired by Datenschleuder (the CCC magazine) and 2600 The Hacker Quarterly, Gonggrijp decided to start his own magazine. In January 1989, the first issue was published. That summer, Nevejan, Gonggrijp and Patrice Riemens organized the Galactic Hacker Party in Paradiso, Amsterdam.

The magazine grew from its original circulation of 50 photocopies to several thousand printed issues. A group of authors published wide-ranging articles including "How to copy the data on the magnetic stripe of your bank card?", "How to build your own pay-TV descrambler" and at least twenty different variations of "How does one make free phone calls?" (much to the dismay of Dutch telecommunication monopoly KPN, then still called PTT Telecommunicatie).

But Hack-Tic was not just about hi-tech mischief: its makers sensed the upcoming importance of communications and technology and were actively involved in making sure new technology was accessible to everyone. In 1991, the foundations were laid for Hacktic Netwerk, the organization which later became the ISP XS4ALL. Also in 1993, Hack-Tic organized Hacking at the End of the Universe (HEU), the first outdoor hacker festival event.

In 1993 the last issue of Hack-Tic appeared. The issues are now online at XS4ALL, the ISP that grew out of Hacktic Network.

== Hack-Tic hacker events ==
Even though the magazine has not been printed since 1993, the community that formed around it continues to organize large hacker culture events every four years, with visitors from a large number of countries. The last editions have been complete outdoor cities with thousands of visitors staying in tents. Visitor participation at these events has been high, leading to events which some describe as "all crew, no visitors". Recent events have had many visitor-organized "villages" and a professionally organized conference program. So far, all the events have been held in the Netherlands.

No.	Date	Full name	Abbreviation	Location^{[A]}	Attendance^{[A]}
1st	August 2–4, 1989	Galactic Hacker Party	GHP	Paradiso, Amsterdam	unknown
2nd	August 4–6, 1993	Hacking at the End of the Universe	HEU 1993	Lelystad	500
3rd	August 8–10, 1997	Hacking In Progress	HIP '97	Almere	1500-2500^{[B]}
4th	August 10–12, 2001	Hackers At Large	HAL 2001	University of Twente, Enschede	2900
5th	July 28–31, 2005	What The Hack	WTH2005	Veldersbos, Liempde	2500
6th	August 13–16, 2009	Hacking at Random	HAR2009	Paasheuvel, Vierhouten	2300
7th	July 31-August 4, 2013	Observe. Hack. Make.	OHM2013	Geestmerambacht, Oudkarspel	3000
8th	August 4–8, 2017	Still Hacking Anyway	SHA2017	Scoutinglandgoed Zeewolde	3300
9th	July 22-26, 2022	May Contain Hackers	MCH2022	Scoutinglandgoed Zeewolde	3500
10th	August 8-12, 2025	What Hackers Yearn	WHY2025	Geestmerambacht, Oudkarspel	4000

^{A} Information copied from Dutch Wikipedia unless mentioned otherwise
^{B} Depending on source

These events have been a major source of inspiration for the Hackers On Planet Earth (HOPE) conferences organized by 2600: The Hacker Quarterly in New York City as well as for the Chaos Communication Camps held near Berlin.

== See also ==
=== Other notable hacker magazines ===
- 2600: The Hacker Quarterly
- Hakin9
- Phrack
- Datenschleuder

=== Similar events ===
- DEF CON, an annual hacker convention, held in Las Vegas, USA
- Chaos Communication Congress, an annual indoor event, held in December in Germany
- Electromagnetic Field, a bi-annually outdoor event, held in England
- Chaos Communication Camp, a quadrennial outdoor event, held in August near Berlin, Germany
