= What Hackers Yearn =

2025 hacker convention in Oudkarspel, Netherlands

- Genre: Hacker con
- Begins: August 8, 2025
- Ends: August 12, 2025
- Frequency: Quadrennial (every 4 years)
- Locations: Oudkarspel, Netherlands
- Inaugurated: 1989
- Previous event: May Contain Hackers (2022)
- Next event: Name not yet announced
- Attendance: 3753 tickets sold
- Website: https://why2025.org/

What Hackers Yearn (WHY2025) was held on August 8-12, 2025 at Geestmerambacht, Oudkarspel (42km north of Amsterdam).

It was a nonprofit outdoor hacker conference and festival in The Netherlands. This conference was part of a sequence of quadrennial hacker camps that began with the Galactic Hacker Party in 1989, followed by Hacking at the End of the Universe in 1993, Hacking In Progress in 1997, Hackers At Large in 2001, What the Hack in 2005, Hacking at Random in 2009, Observe. Hack. Make. in 2013, Still Hacking Anyway in 2017, and May Contain Hackers in 2022.

The camp took place from 8 to 12 august at Geestmerambacht in Oudkarspel. More than 3750 hackers and technology minded people from 50 countries participated in workshops and discussions. During the camp, lectures and workshops were held in conference tents, with over 179 speakers presenting including Dutch Government employees.

== Activities ==
The conference had 344 sessions, 176 talks, 104 workshops, and 62 entertainment sessions (music performances, movie watching, etc.). All scheduled talks were live-streamed and recorded, and published online at the streaming Portal of the Chaos Computer Club, at media.ccc.de/c/WHY2025.

== Infrastructure ==
Participants had Gigabit Ethernet through Datenklos (repurposed new chemical toilets with Ethernet switches). A network with 400 GB uplink/downlink provided high-speed network covering the entire camp, with both Public, Encrypted, and Eduroam service. The camp also featured a local DECT phone network, with optional SIP service SIP for app-based calling from modern devices like Android, iPhone, and laptops. Also found on all fields of the camp are the field phones that could be used by those without a DECT or smartphone.

== Volunteering ==
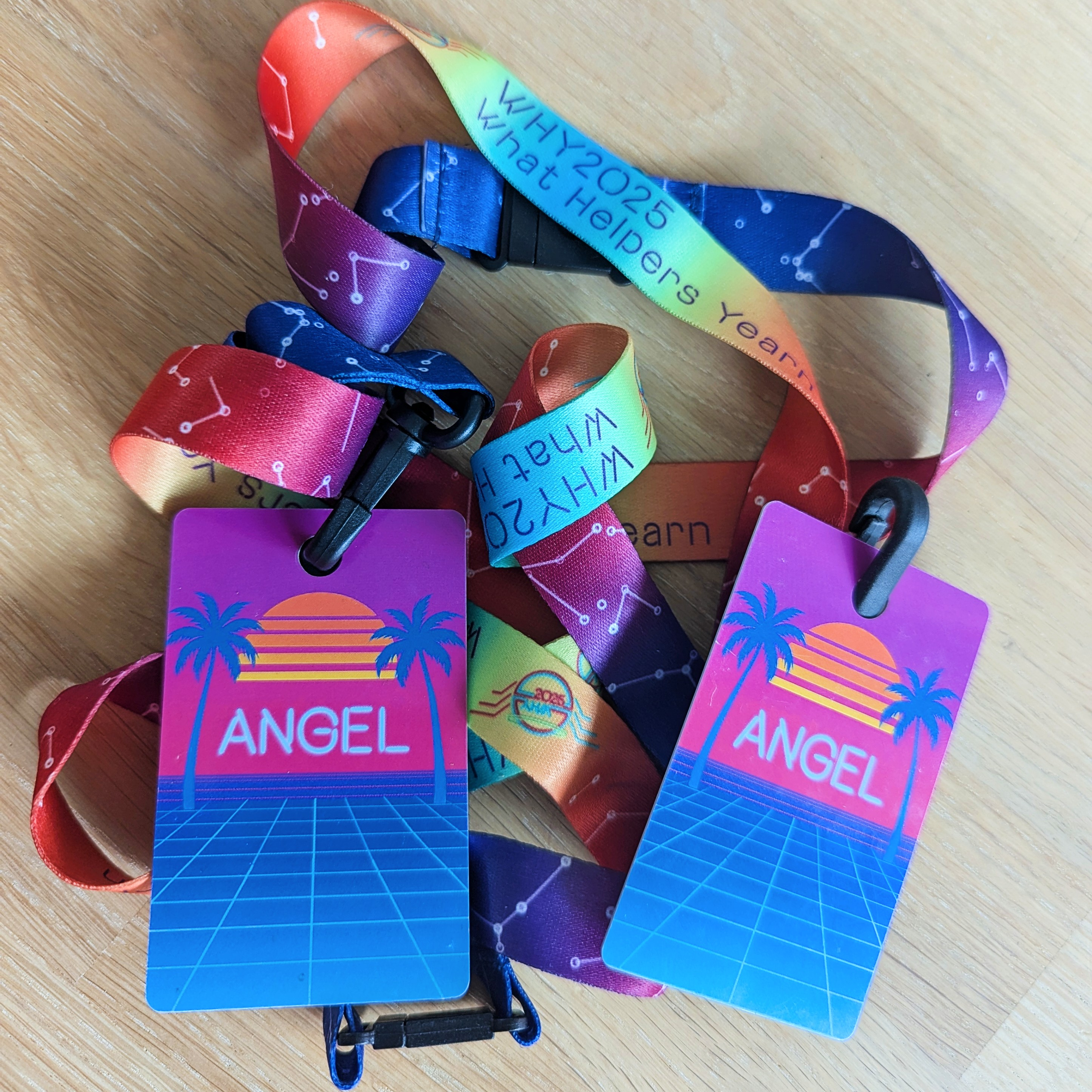
Design of the "Angel badge" worn by volunteers.

The camp operated an extensive network of volunteering by participants (also called "Angels", using the shift-planning system "Engelsystem", developed by the German computer club Chaos Computer Club. Volunteers were rewarded with free meals for every two hours worked, with 1141 volunteers spending a total of 9477 hours (or 56.4 weeks) in the span of 5 days. Besides all the registered angel hours, many additional volunteers helped with buildup and tear-down.

== Controversies ==
=== Badge Fire Hazard ===
The electronic badge meant to be handed out at WHY2025 made news due to serious fire safety concerns. The WHY2025 badge was designed to be powered by 2 Li-Ion 18650 battery cells connected in parallel. The cells provided to visitors are of the "unprotected" kind and thus capable of providing a very large short circuit current. A short circuit can cause parts to overheat, posing a burn or fire risk to nearby materials (e.g. skin, clothing, luggage). Due to the design of the badge, there are several ways a short circuit could occur. In a worst-case scenario, the badge could reach temperatures of 2000°.

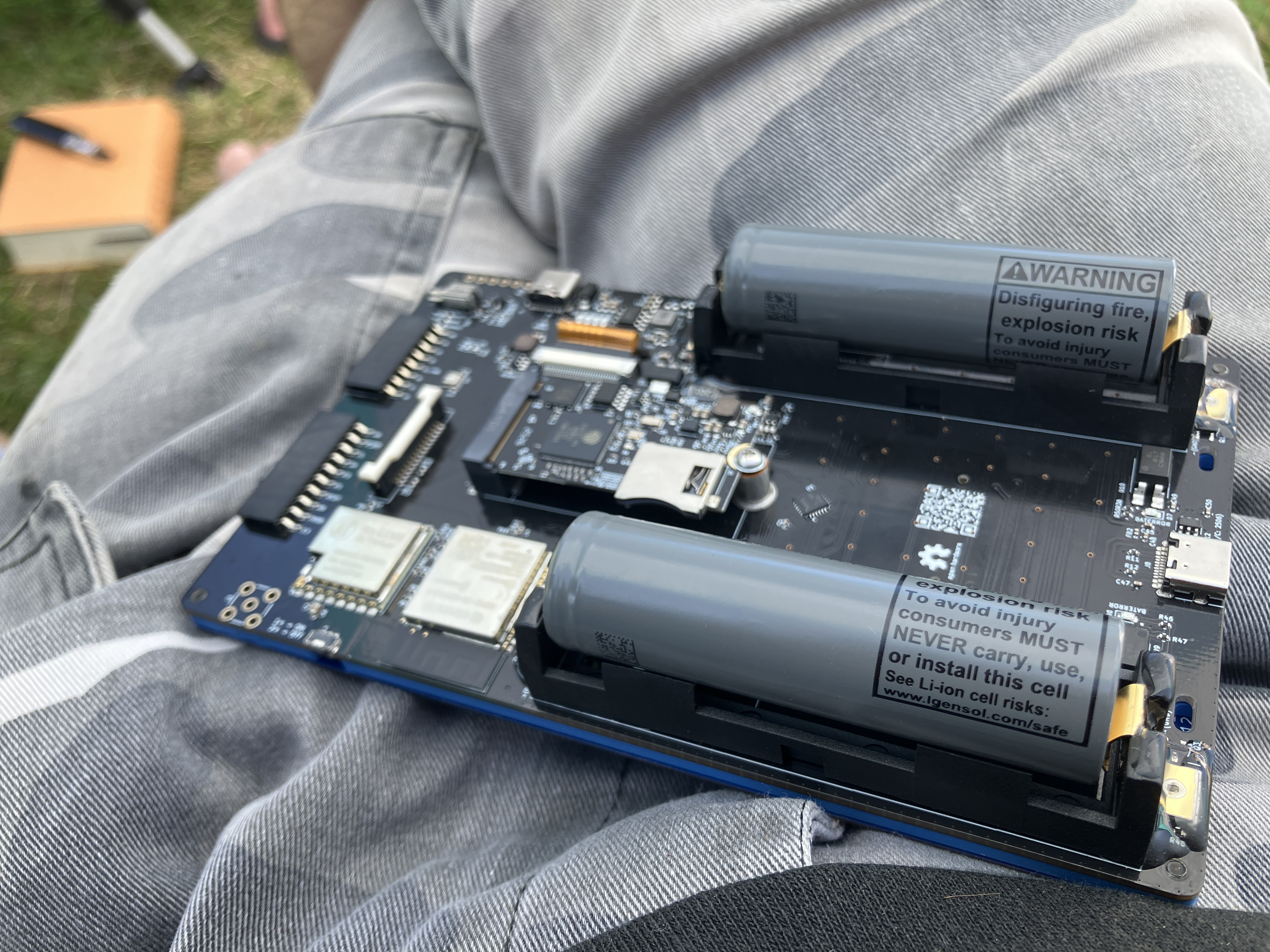
Badge and Batteries, WHY2025

Hand-out of the badge was initially scheduled to be on arrival, but was delayed to sporadic moments close to the end of the event in order to fix the fire issues. Long queues lasting hours in strong sun caused health complaints, and many participants were unable to get a badge at all. Badge team has indicated no after-event delivery or refund is available. The Badge also had quality issues in screws and other components unrelated to the fire hazard.

=== Team:Warehouse Burnout ===
During the event on August 11, Team:Warehouse announced their resignation and the temporary closure of the warehouse, due to volunteer burnout and what the team lead described as a departure from the event’s original hacker ethos. The project leadership announced the re-opening of the warehouse the next day under a newly assembled team, with additional support from angels and members of the original team.
