= Quadrennial Dutch hacker convention =

Reoccurring hacker convention in the Netherlands

- Genre: Hacker con
- Frequency: quadrennial (every 4 years)
- Inaugurated: 1989

The quadrennial Dutch hacker convention is a hacker convention. It reoccurs every four years at different locations around the Netherlands. It was first held in 1989. In the past, it was organized by Hack-Tic magazine, and currently it is organized by the IFCAT Foundation.

On years where it is not held, two other similar events are held instead: Chaos Communication Camp in Germany (every 4 years), and Electromagnetic Field in the UK (every 2 years).

== Galactic Hacker Party (1989) ==
The Galactic Hacker Party was a hacker con that was held in Paradiso in the Netherlands from August 2, 1989 to August 4, 1989. Visitors were people with an interest in technology (mainly computers) and the - at that time - relatively unknown internet.

=== Hacker party and conference ===
Along with the party, a conference was held, named ICATA (Intercontinental Conference on Alternative Use of Technology Amsterdam), but both organisers and visitors saw the combination actually as one event. This combination proved to be successful and the concept has been repeated every four years since, up to What Hackers Yearn in 2025.

=== Organisation and attendance ===
Driving force behind the event were people associated with the hacker magazine Hack-Tic, its editor in chief Rop Gonggrijp, Patrice Riemens, and Caroline Nevejan on behalf of Paradiso. It was supported by a department of the University of Amsterdam, which supplied a permanent connection to the internet, a novelty at the time.

The Galactic Hacker Party and conference were attended by Hack-Tic readers and contributors, people from the German Chaos Computer Club, the New York based 2600: The Hacker Quarterly, along with participants from various other countries. Attendees exchanged knowledge and experience on computer systems, dial-up connections, computer viruses and hacking, which wasn't yet illegal. At the conference lectures were held on feminism and computers, models for artificial intelligence and on computer-human interaction. The joint declaration of the conference started with "The free and infuttered flow of information is an essential part of our fundamental liberties and shall be upheld in all circumstances."

== Hacking at the End of the Universe (1993) ==
HEU 1993 was a hacker conference and open-air festival near Lelystad, Netherlands in August 1993, organized by the hacker magazine Hack-Tic. It had an attendance of 500 people.

== Hacking in Progress (1997) ==
HIP'97 took place from August 8 until August 10, 1997 at the campsite Kotterbos in Almere, Netherlands. It had an attendance of 1500-2500 people, depending on source.

== Hackers at Large (2001) ==
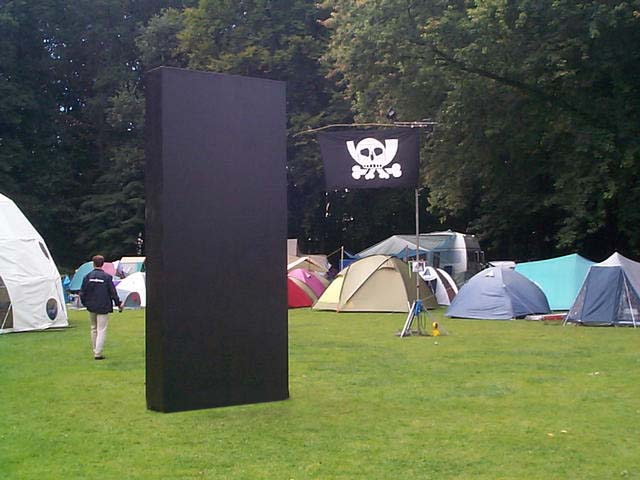
HAL 2001 monolith at the camp site

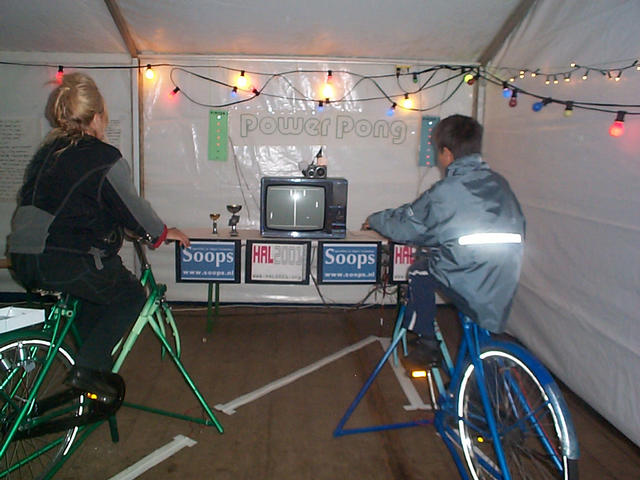
Bicycle powered game of Pong at HAL2001

HAL2001 was a Dutch hacker con held at the University of Twente, Enschede, Netherlands between August 10 to August 12, 2001. This site, which hosts one of Europe's major network operations centers, was unique in allowing the conference to have, at the time, the largest Internet uplink speeds of any conference: a fiber-optic connection in excess of 1 gigabit per second. The conference never fully utilized the bandwidth; maximum bandwidth use was approximately 200 Mbit/s.

The main political topic of the conference was the fight against the DMCA and similar anti-hacker legislation under way in Europe.

The name HAL was primarily derived from the film 2001: A Space Odyssey, in which HAL is the name of the ship's artificial intelligence. This name was backronymed Hackers At Large.

The conference was held primarily outdoors. Logistically speaking, the network structure was quite a feat, with approximately 15 km of category 5 cable for the ethernet backbones, as well as supplying power feeds for the tents' computers.

There was a technology-free zone, The Solaris Sl@ckers S@lon, named for the 1972 film by Andrei Tarkovsky, which is often thought to be the Russian answer to 2001: A Space Odyssey. The only technology permitted in the place was a television, a DVD player running the movie, and a Turkish (electric) samovar for brewing tea. A fishtank was set aside for drowning mobile phones which rang in the tent (it remained empty).

This conference was run by Stichting HAL2001, a not-for-profit organization. Attendance was 2900.

== What the Hack (2005) ==
What The Hack was an outdoor hacker conference held in Liempde, Netherlands between the 28th and 31st of July, 2005.

== Hacking at Random (2009) ==
Hacking at Random was an outdoor hacker conference that took place in the Netherlands from August 13 to August 16, 2009. It had an attendance of 2300 people.

It was situated on a large camp-site near the small town Vierhouten in the Netherlands called the Paasheuvel.

== Observe. Hack. Make. (2013) ==
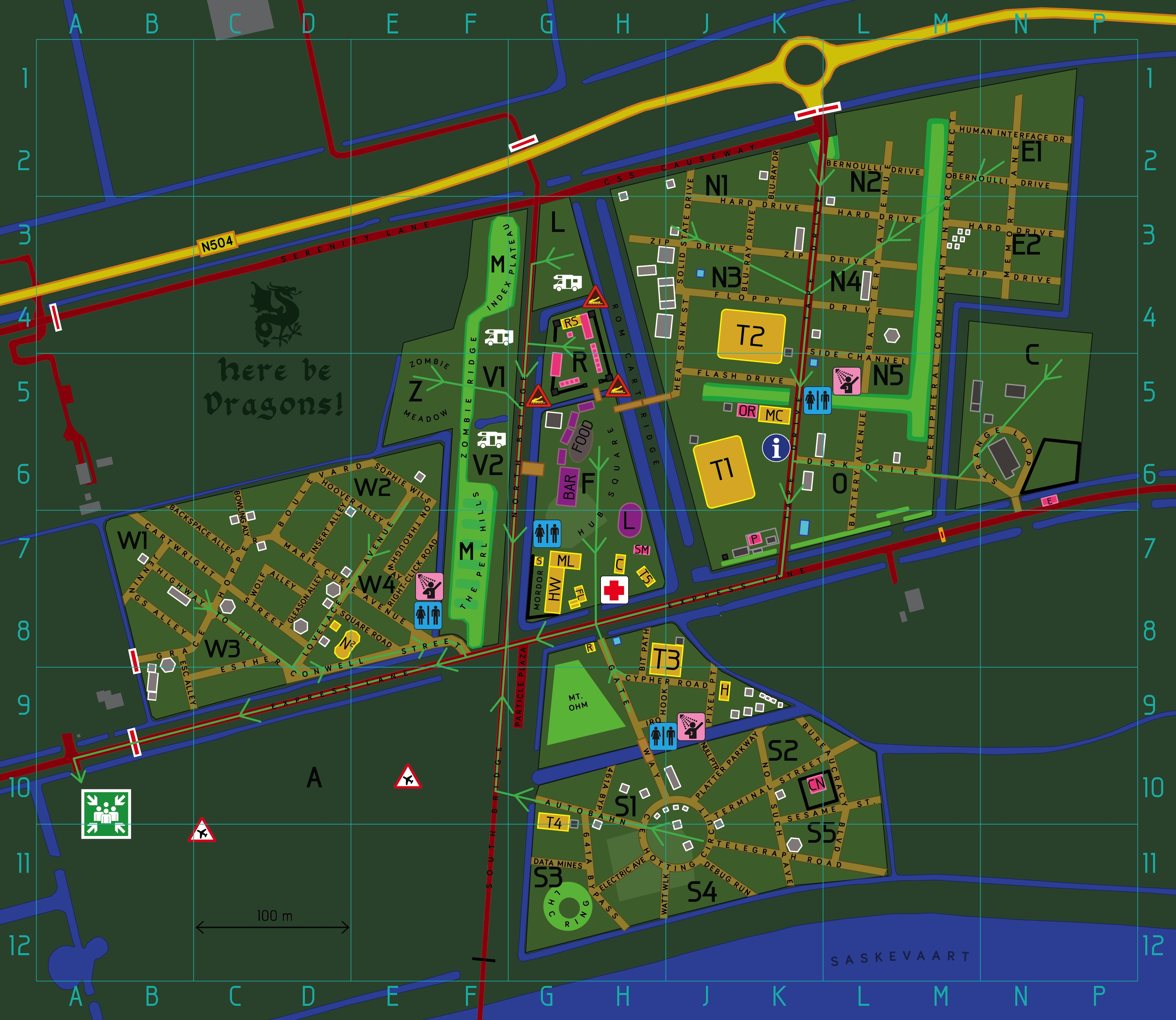
Map of the OHM 2013 site

Observe. Hack. Make. also known as OHM, was an outdoor hacker conference that took place in the Netherlands from July 31 to August 4, 2013.

== Still Hacking Anyway (2017) ==
Still Hacking Anyway, abbreviated SHA2017 (Note: perhaps to mimic the designators of the Secure Hash Algorithm series of cryptographic hash functions) was a hacker conference and festival in The Netherlands. It is part of the quadrennial hacker camps that started in 1989 with the Galactic Hacker Party in Amsterdam.

The camp took place from 4 to 8 August on a scouts terrain in Zeewolde. At least 3300 hackers and technology minded people from 50 countries participated in workshops and discussions. Participants had Gigabit Ethernet through Datenklos (new chemical toilets with Ethernet switches). A radiostation with FM license and a GSM tower were also built. During the camp, lectures and workshops were held in different tents, including talks from PGP founder Phil Zimmermann and William Binney. Recordings of talks can be found on the streaming portal of the Chaos Computer Club, at https://media.ccc.de/c/SHA2017.

== May Contain Hackers (2022) ==
May Contain Hackers, abbreviated MCH2022, was a nonprofit outdoor hacker conference and festival in The Netherlands.

== What Hackers Yearn (2025) ==
What Hackers Yearn (WHY2025) was held on August 8-12, 2025 at Geestmerambacht, Oudkarspel (42km north of Amsterdam).
