= May Contain Hackers =

Nonprofit outdoor hacker camp

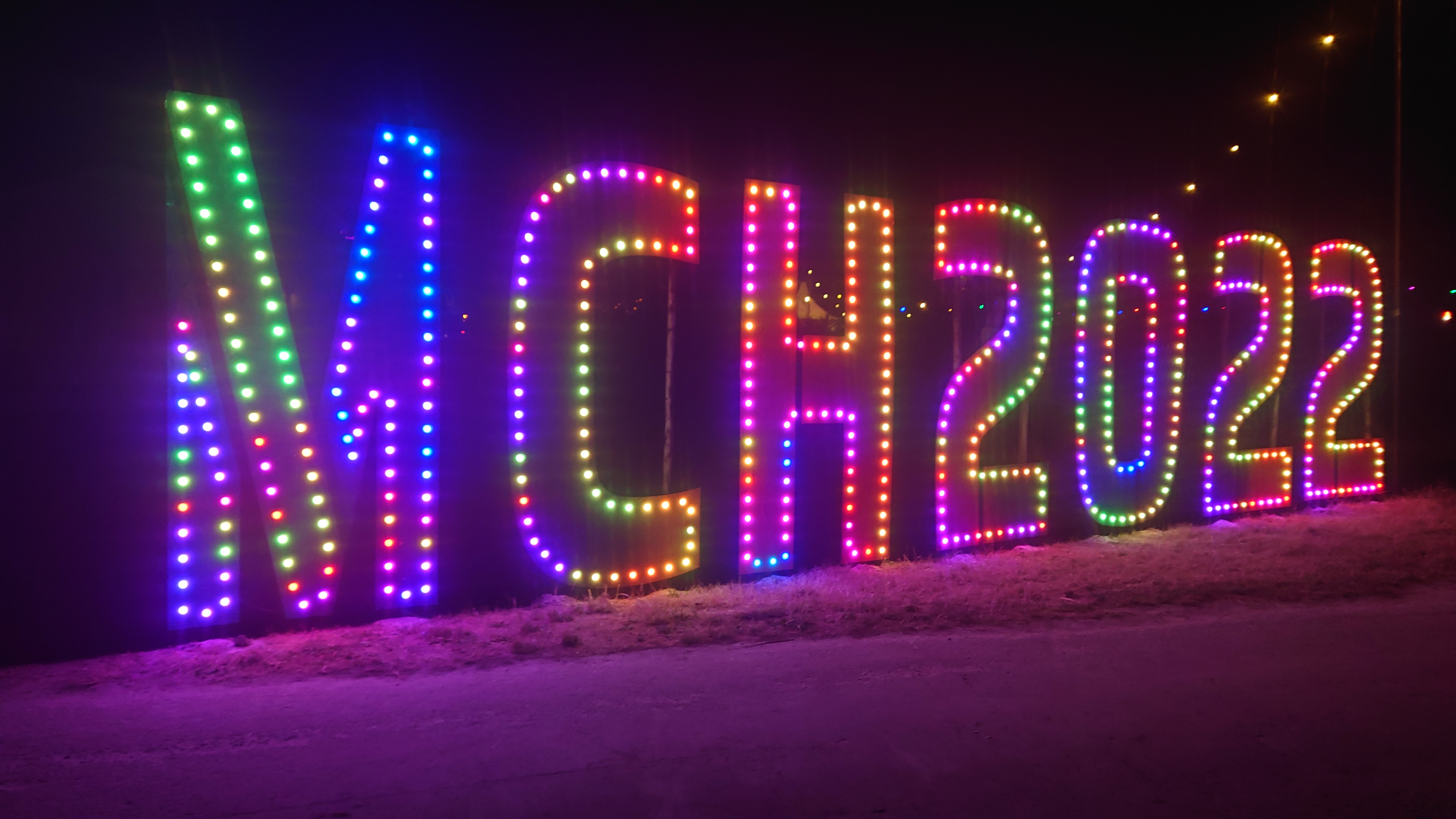
- Genre: Hacker con
- Begins: July 22, 2022
- Ends: July 26, 2022
- Frequency: Quadrennial (every 4 years), but disrupted by COVID-19
- Locations: Zeewolde, Netherlands
- Inaugurated: 1989
- Previous event: Still Hacking Anyway (2017)
- Next event: What Hackers Yearn (2025)
- Attendance: 3500 tickets sold
- Website: https://mch2022.org/

May Contain Hackers, abbreviated MCH2022, was a nonprofit outdoor hacker conference and festival in The Netherlands.

It is part of the quadrennial hacker camps that started in 1989 with the Galactic Hacker Party in Amsterdam. This conference was part of a sequence that began with the Galactic Hacker Party in 1989, followed by Hacking at the End of the Universe in 1993, Hacking In Progress in 1997, Hackers At Large in 2001, What the Hack in 2005, Hacking at Random in 2009, Observe. Hack. Make. in 2013, and Still Hacking Anyway in 2017.

The camp took place from 22 to 26 July on a scouts terrain in Zeewolde. At least 3219 hackers and technology minded people from 50 countries participated in workshops and discussions. During the camp, lectures and workshops were held in conference tents, with notable speakers being Mikko Hyppönen and the Dutch Government's Ministry of Health, Welfare and Sport.

== Activities ==
The conference had 233 sessions from 179 speakers, 144 talks, 61 workshops, 27 music performances, and movie watching sessions. All scheduled talks were live-streamed and recorded, and published online at the streaming Portal of the Chaos Computer Club, at media.ccc.de/c/MCH2022.

== Infrastructure ==
Participants had Gigabit Ethernet through Datenklos (repurposed new chemical toilets with Ethernet switches). A network of 130 Wireless access points provided high-speed network covering the entire camp, with both Public, Encrypted, Spacenet and Eduroam service. The camp also featured a local DECT phone network, with optional SIP service SIP for app-based calling from modern devices like Android, iPhone, and laptops. Also found on all fields of the camp are the field phones that could be used by those without a DECT or smartphone.

== Volunteering ==
The camp operated an extensive network of volunteering by participants (also called "Angels", using the shift-planning system "Engelsystem", developed by the German computer club Chaos Computer Club. Volunteers were rewarded with free meals for every two hours worked, with 946 volunteers spending a total of 6921 hours (or 41.2 weeks) in the span of 5 days. Besides all the registered angel hours, many additional volunteers helped with buildup and tear-down.
