= Observe. Hack. Make. =

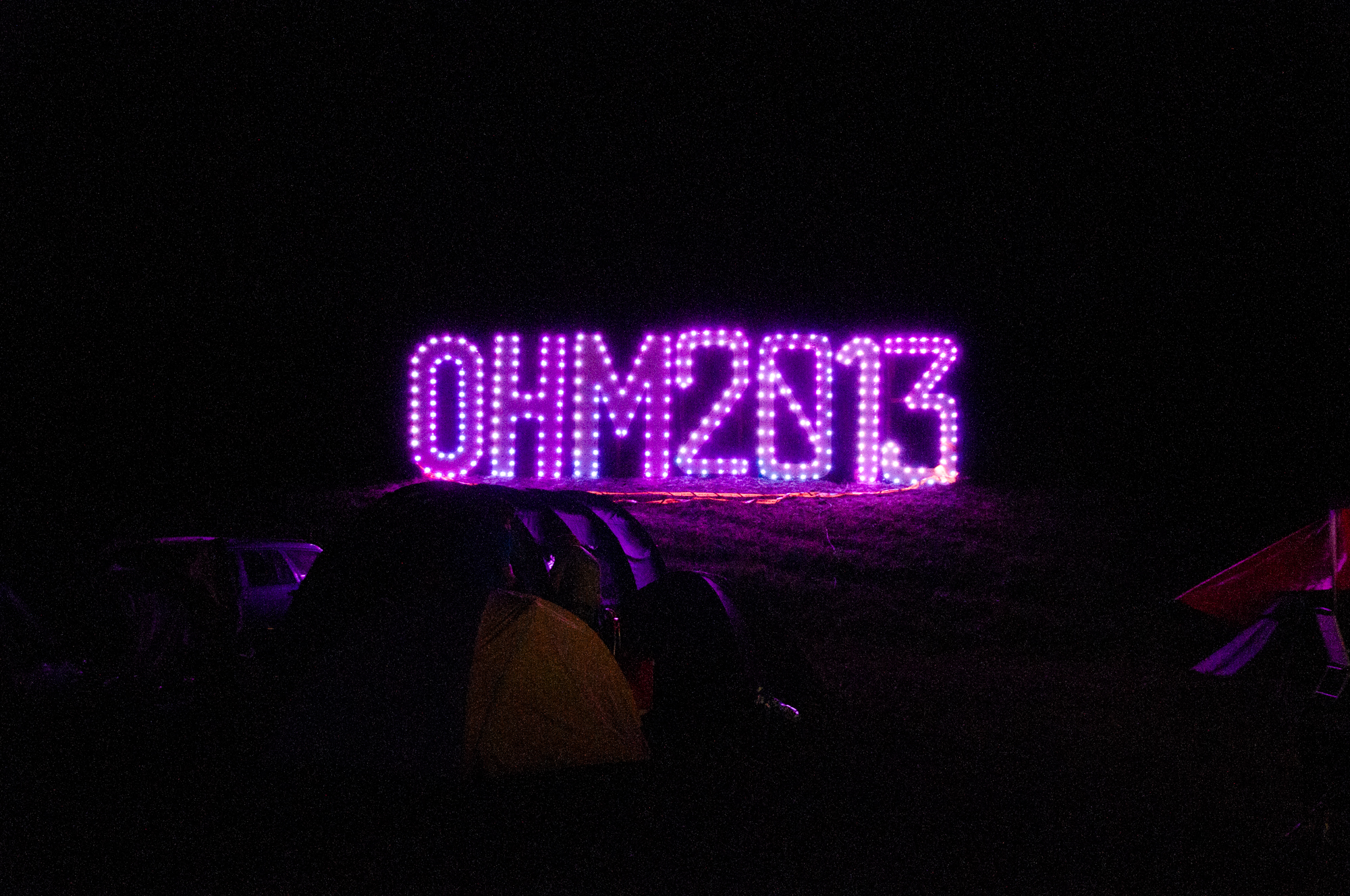
- Genre: Hacker con
- Begins: July 31, 2013
- Ends: August 4, 2013
- Frequency: quadrennial (every 4 years)
- Locations: Geestmerambacht, Oudkarspel, Netherlands
- Inaugurated: 1989
- Previous event: Hacking at Random (2009)
- Next event: Still Hacking Anyway (2017)
- Attendance: 3000 tickets sold
- Website: https://ohm2013.org/

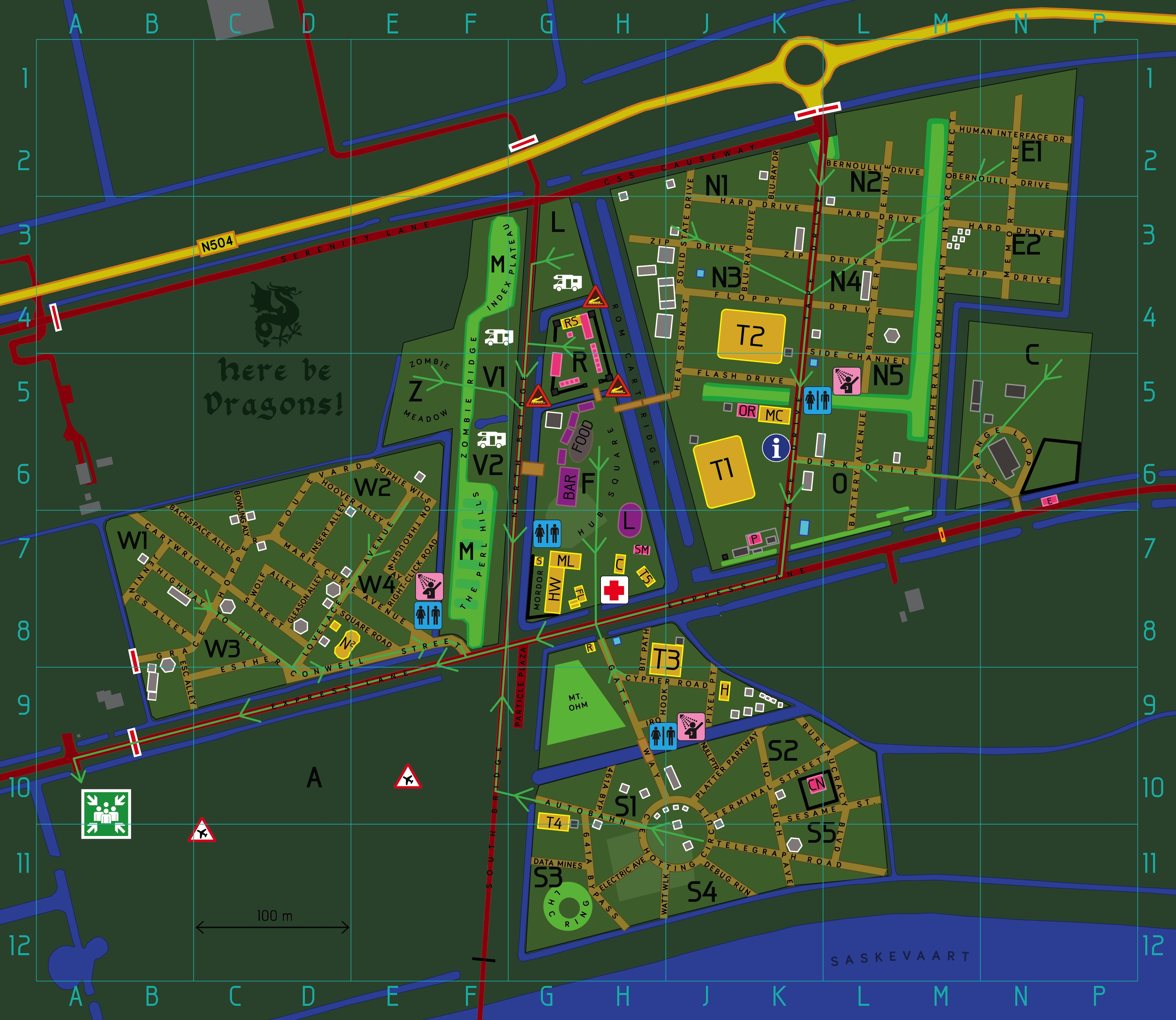
Map of the OHM 2013 site

Observe. Hack. Make. also known as OHM, was an outdoor hacker conference that took place in the Netherlands from July 31 to August 4, 2013.

This conference was part of a sequence that began with the Galactic Hacker Party in 1989, followed by Hacking at the End of the Universe in 1993, Hacking in Progress in 1997, Hackers at Large in 2001, What the Hack in 2005, and Hacking at Random in 2009. The tradition continued in 2017 with Still Hacking Anyway, May Contain Hackers in 2022 and What Hackers Yearn in 2025.

With 3000 tickets sold, the camp was completely sold out weeks before it started. With 700 more tickets than the previous camp it was the biggest Dutch hacker camp so far.

== Julian Assange ==
One of the highlights of the event was a live video connection with Julian Assange. After his appearance at Hacking at Random in 2009 the organizers invited Assange again. This time he spoke to the audience over a live video connection from the Ecuador embassy in London.
