= Hacking at Random =

Hacker conference in Netherlands

Coordinates: 52.33°N 5.824°E

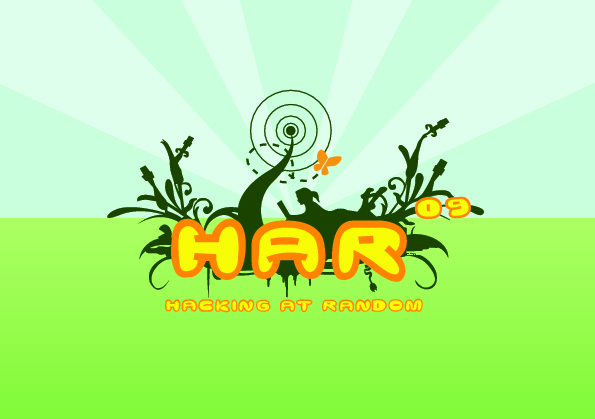
- Genre: Hacker con
- Begins: August 13, 2009
- Ends: August 16, 2009
- Frequency: quadrennial (every 4 years)
- Locations: Paasheuvel, Vierhouten, Netherlands
- Inaugurated: 1989
- Previous event: What the Hack (2005)
- Next event: Observe. Hack. Make. (2013)
- Website: https://har2009.org/

Hacking at Random was an outdoor hacker conference that took place in the Netherlands from August 13 to August 16, 2009. It had an attendance of 2300 people.

It was situated on a large camp-site near the small town Vierhouten in the Netherlands called the Paasheuvel.

This conference was the second most recent event in a sequence that began with the Galactic Hacker Party in 1989, followed by Hacking at the End of the Universe in 1993, Hacking In Progress in 1997, Hackers At Large in 2001, and What the Hack in 2005, and succeeded by Observe. Hack. Make. in 2013, Still Hacking Anyway in 2017 and May Contain Hackers in 2022. Pre-event announcement by a Hackaday contributor "Eliot" stated it was brought by the same people as What the Hack 2005.

Like the previous Dutch hacker conferences, the event was run by volunteers, and all attendees, including sponsors, were regarded as volunteers who were expected to help run it.

With over 170 talks and 3 large lecture halls, this edition was by far the largest in the series of quadrennial Dutch events.

The special side tents offering off-the-tracks program added to the open atmosphere which was manly driven by mixing technology, art and social aspects together. A custom camp currency (being copy-cat'ed using 3D printers), illuminated flying objects at night and lock picking contests during the day where accompanied by techno-DJs generating baselines from raw-network modulation data.
