= What the Hack =

Outdoor hacker conference

Coordinates: 51°33′16″N 5°20′37″E

- Genre: Hacker con
- Begins: July 28 2005
- Ends: July 31 2005
- Frequency: quadrennial (every 4 years)
- Locations: Liempde, Netherlands
- Inaugurated: 1989
- Previous event: Hackers at Large (2001)
- Next event: Hacking at Random (2009)
- Website: https://whatthehack.org/

What The Hack was an outdoor hacker conference held in Liempde, Netherlands between the 28th and 31st of July, 2005.

== Timeline ==
What the Hack was an event in a sequence that began with the Galactic Hacker Party in 1989, followed by Hacking at the End of the Universe in 1993, Hacking In Progress in 1997, Hackers At Large in 2001, Hacking at Random in 2009, Observe. Hack. Make. in 2013 and Still Hacking Anyway in 2017. The most recent edition was May Contain Hackers in 2022.

== Attendance ==
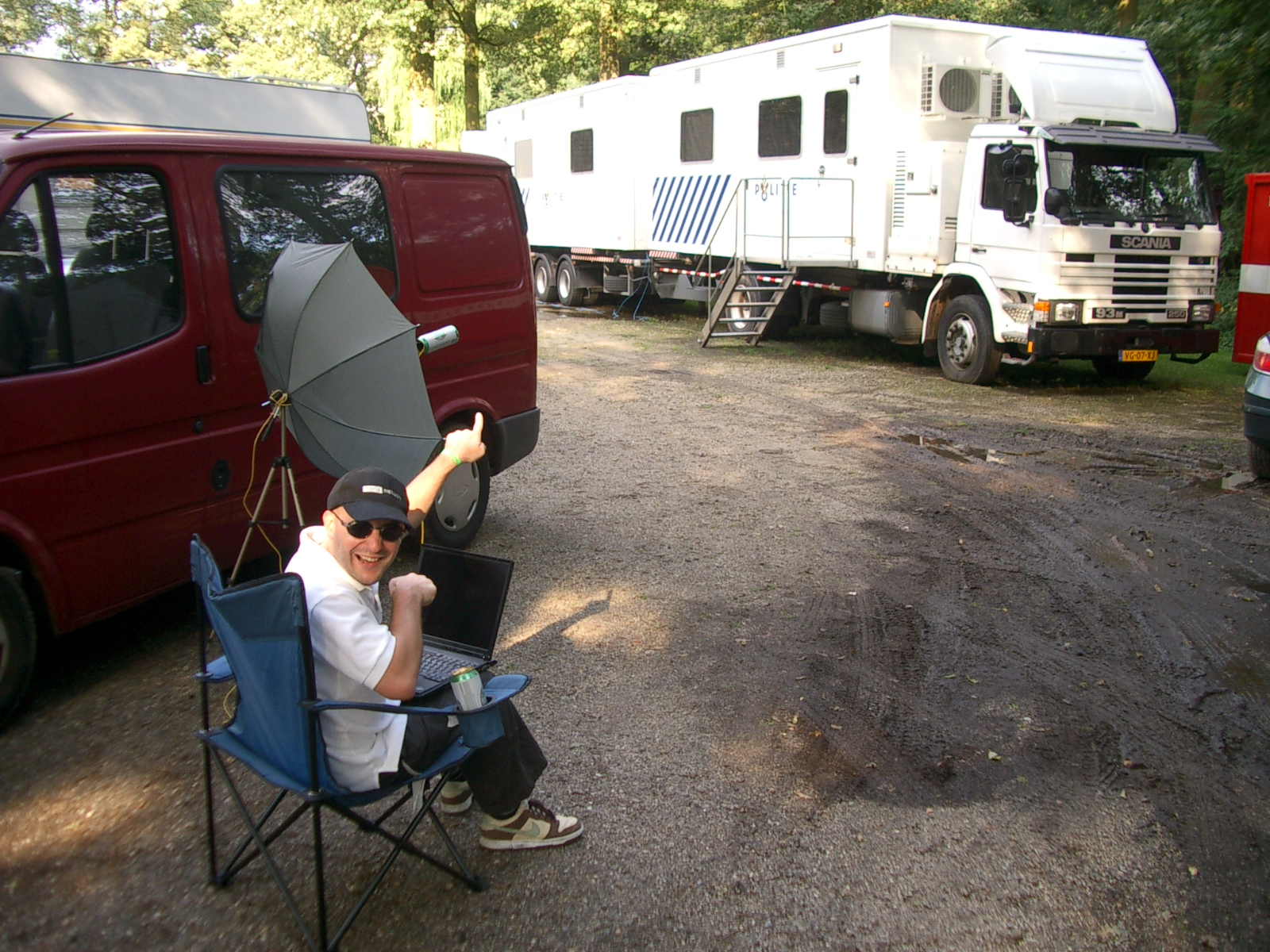
Mobile police office

Over 2000 hackers visited the event to participate in an exchange on several technical, social and philosophical matters of importance to the technically inclined community.

Visitors from all over the world arrived at the Camp Ground including groups of such diversity as OpenBSD developers, the German Chaos Computer Club, members of the 2600: The Hacker Quarterly hackergroup, and numerous smaller groups and organisations in addition.

While planning the event, there were several issues with the local government attempting to cancel the event because of "the risk for public security".

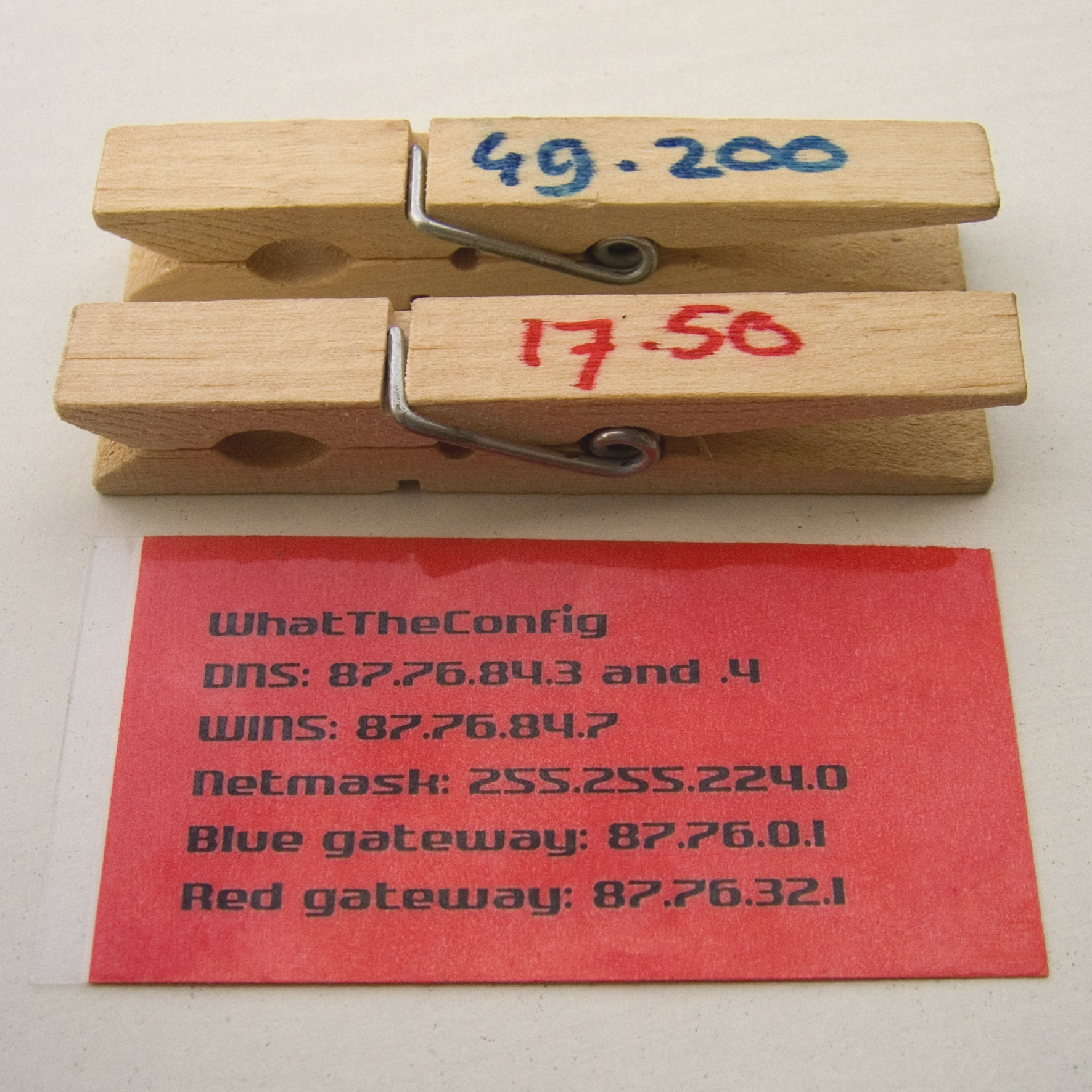
Peg-DHCP allocation

Several smaller events were embedded in or inspired by this event like the Hacktrain, which was planned to travel there, as well as the local radio station, and the smaller Police village which featured specialists from their IT Department, as well as interested government parties. Peg DHCP (RFC 2322) was used during the event to allocate IP addresses. The method had been first devised and used at Hacking In Progress.

== Activities ==
Some of the lectures and events this edition were:

- Reverse engineering Microsoft .NET
- Cyborgs: Practical Experimentation
- Attacks on Digital Passports
- Using Linux for Embedded Devices
- Doing a WiFi Long-Shot
- Symbian Security
- Do We Run Out of Oil?
- How to Lower Electricity Consumption in Your Home
- The Politics of Psychedelic Research
- OpenStreetMap

== See also ==
- Hacker con
- MTV What the Hack! - is a TV show on MTV India co-hosted by VJ Jose & Ankit Fadia

== Media coverage ==
- The What The Hack press page (contains links to many articles, mostly in Dutch or German).

== Links ==
- Official webpage archived at Wayback Machine
- Talk video downloads
