= Caroline Nevejan =

Dutch university teacher

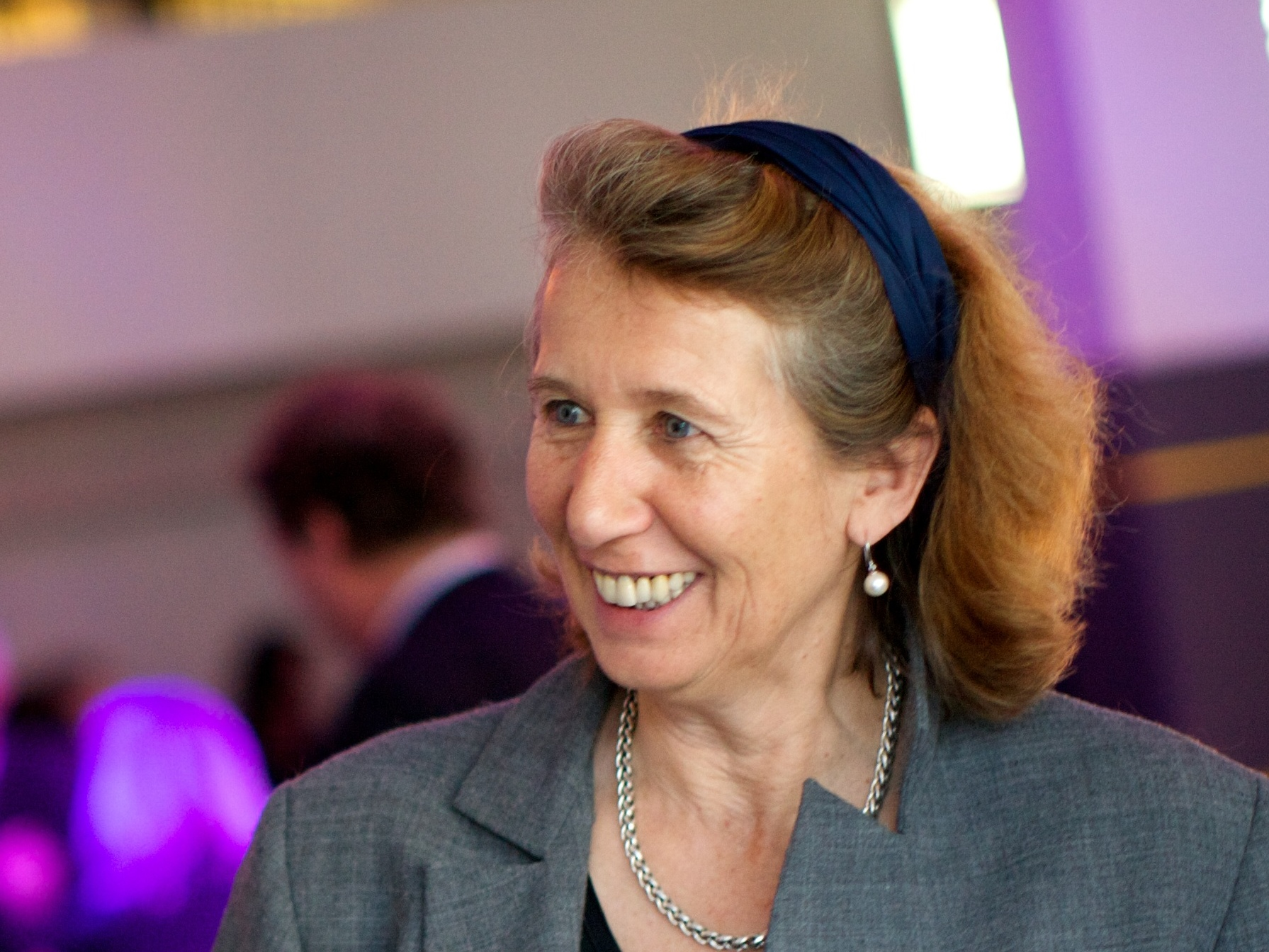
- Born: 1958 (age 67–68)

Academic background
- Education: University of Amsterdam

Academic work
- Discipline: Sociologist
- Website: http://nevejan.org

Caroline Irma Maria Nevejan (Tilburg, 1958) is Chief Science Officer with the City of Amsterdam and professor by special appointment of Designing Urban Experience at the University of Amsterdam. She is responsible for research, science and knowledge development in Amsterdam. She is known as a Dutch internet pioneer.

== Internet pioneer ==
Nevejan trained as a social scientist in the 1970s and belongs to the first generation of internet users. As Politics and Culture programmer at Paradiso from 1988 to 1999, she organized events such as the Galactic Hacker Party and The Seropositive Ball.

In 1994 she founded the Society for Old and New Media (Maatschappij voor Oude en Nieuwe Media). She did this together with Marleen Stikker, who was then "mayor" of the Digital City (De Digitale Stad). In 1996 they moved to the Waag on the Nieuwmarkt at which time the name changed to Waag Society. The foundation was the focal point for innovation in Dutch communication practices.

To make the internet more accessible for everyone, the foundation designed an internet-enabled digital reading table ("Storytable"). The table won the Rotterdam Design Prize in 1997.

== Metropolitan issues ==
As Chief Science Officer of Amsterdam, Nevejan is responsible for research, science and knowledge development in that city. She sees policy as a continuous design process in which people must be involved. In her research program Designing Urban Experience, scientists, residents, artists, designers and civil servants work together on innovative approaches and methods for the Amsterdam Metropolitan Area.

One of her projects is City Rhythm, a collaboration between civil servants, scientists and students and six municipalities that study whether different rhythms in a city can be influenced by social cohesion in the neighborhood.

== Publications (selected) ==
- Nevejan C., Badenoch A. (2014) How Amsterdam Invented the Internet: European Networks of Significance, 1980–1995. In: Alberts G., Oldenziel R. (red.) Hacking Europe. History of Computing. Springer, London
- Nevejan C. (2007) Presence and the Design of Trust, Proefschrift aan de Universiteit van Amsterdam
