= Liempde =

- Village
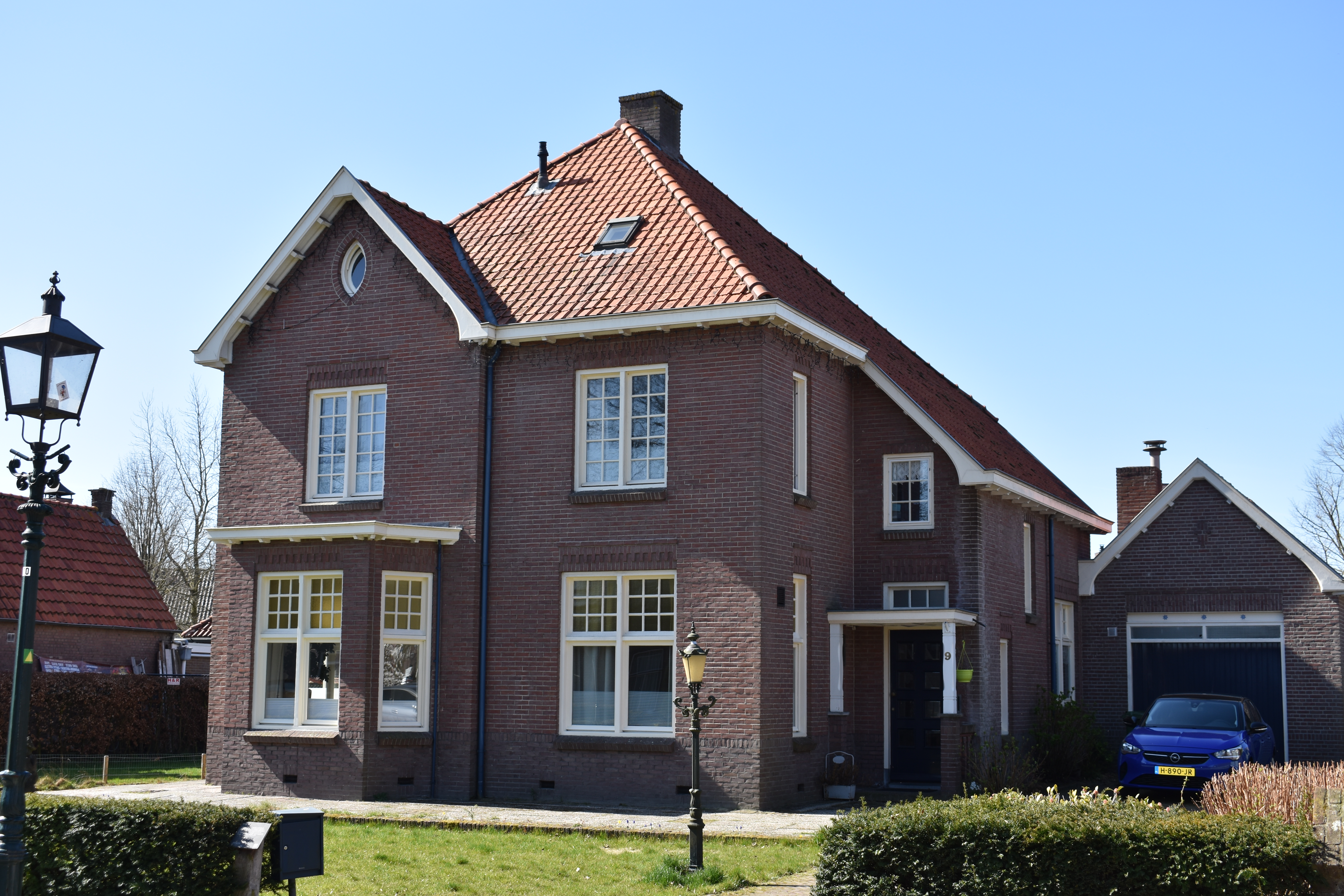
- House in Liempde

- Location in the province of North Brabant in the Netherlands Liempde (Netherlands)
- Coordinates: 51°35′N 5°20′E
- Country: Netherlands
- Province: North Brabant
- Municipality: Boxtel

Area
  - Total: 1.99 km^{2} (0.77 sq mi)
- Elevation: 10 m (33 ft)

Population (2021)
  - Total: 4,080
  - Density: 2,050/km^{2} (5,310/sq mi)
- Time zone: UTC+1 (CET)
  - Summer (DST): UTC+2 (CEST)
- Postal code: 5298
- Dialing code: 0411
- Major roads: A2
- Website: www.liempde.info

Liempde is a village in the Netherlands in the municipality Boxtel. Annually the Flevo Christian music festival is held here. In 2005 the event What the Hack took place in Liempde.

Liempde is situated in the center of the Dutch province North Brabant in the valley of the Dommel. It lies in the center of the triangle formed by 's-Hertogenbosch, Tilburg and Eindhoven. Until the end of the nineteenth century it was a dark and diffuse area. The economy was mostly based on the production of wooden shoes. Today a few of these manufacturers still exist. In the beginning of the twentieth century Philips changed Eindhoven in the 'city of lights'. In Liempde this turned the darkness into a gloom. Each year at second Easter day the people celebrate the 'coming of the gloom' by a manifestation called 'Boeremèrt'. That day the entire village returns to the 'era of the coming of the light'. Storytellers, musicians, old policemen seem to return from their graves. Stories are told about their ancestors—like the famous Neighbour Piet and the unforgettable Jan Pieters—and about the secret cave near the Dommel.

Liempde was a separate municipality until 1996 when it became part of Boxtel.

== Gallery ==
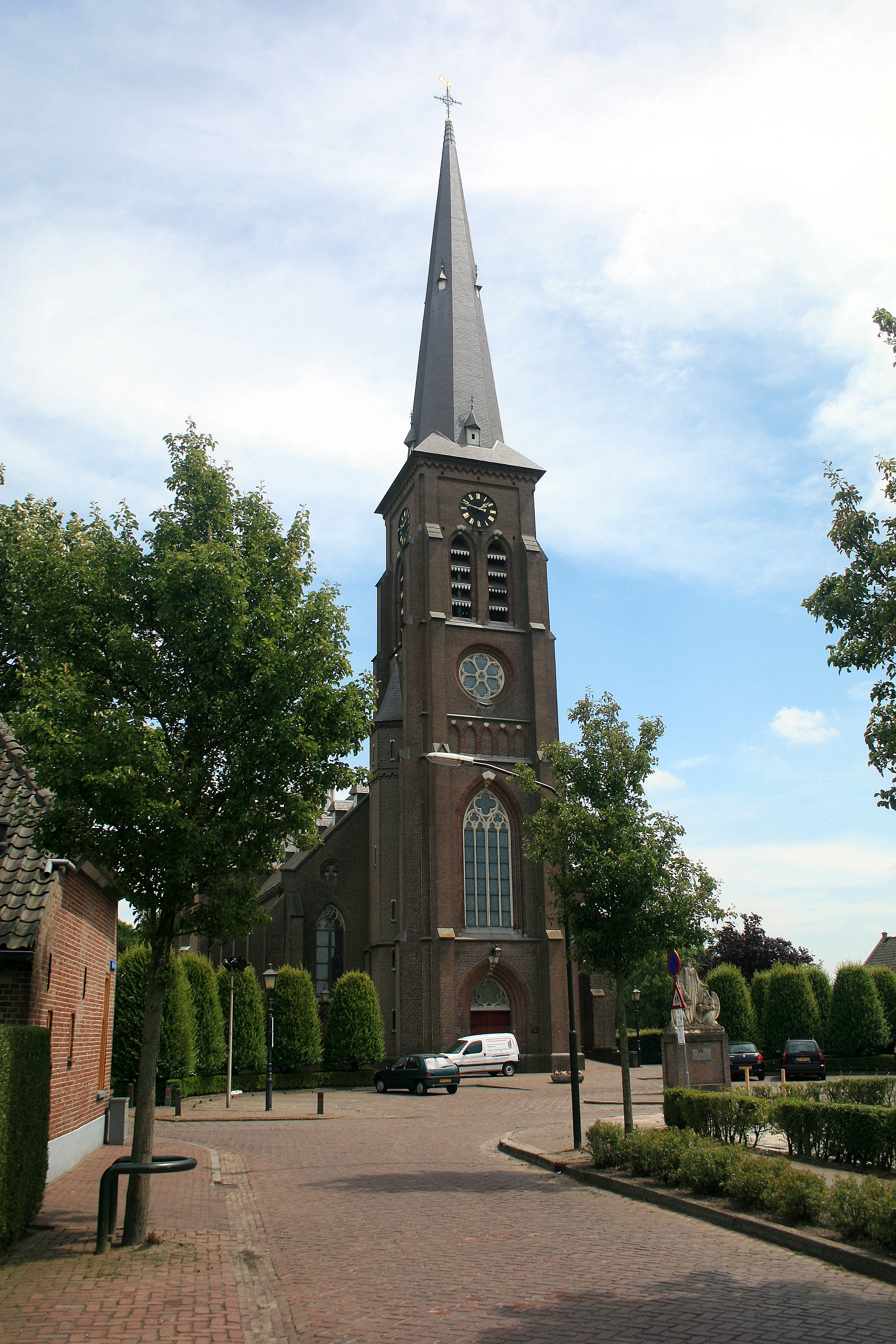
Catholic church

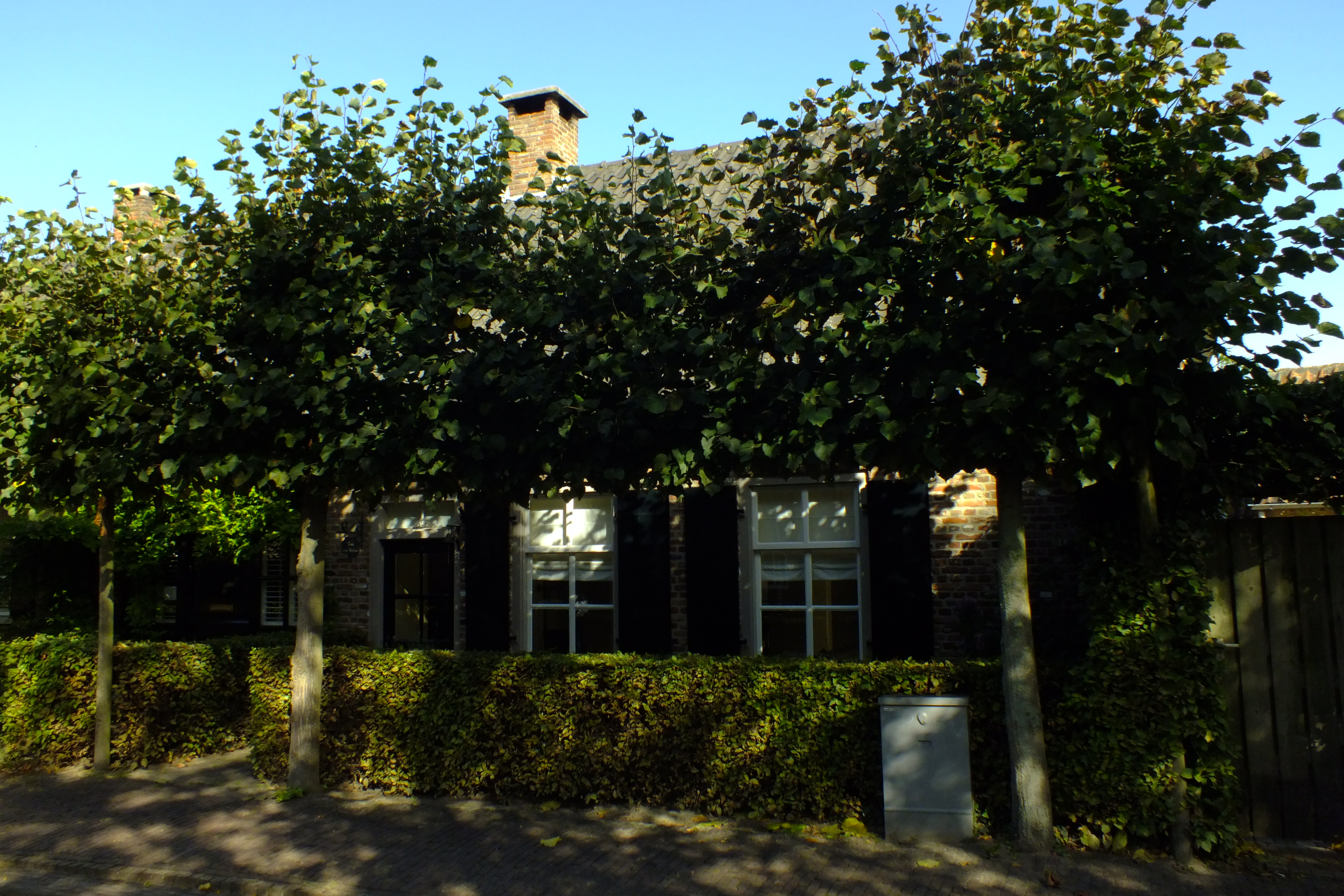
Farm in Liempde

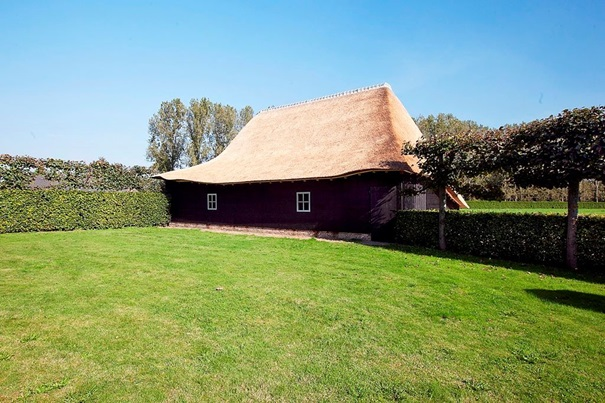
Farm in Liempde

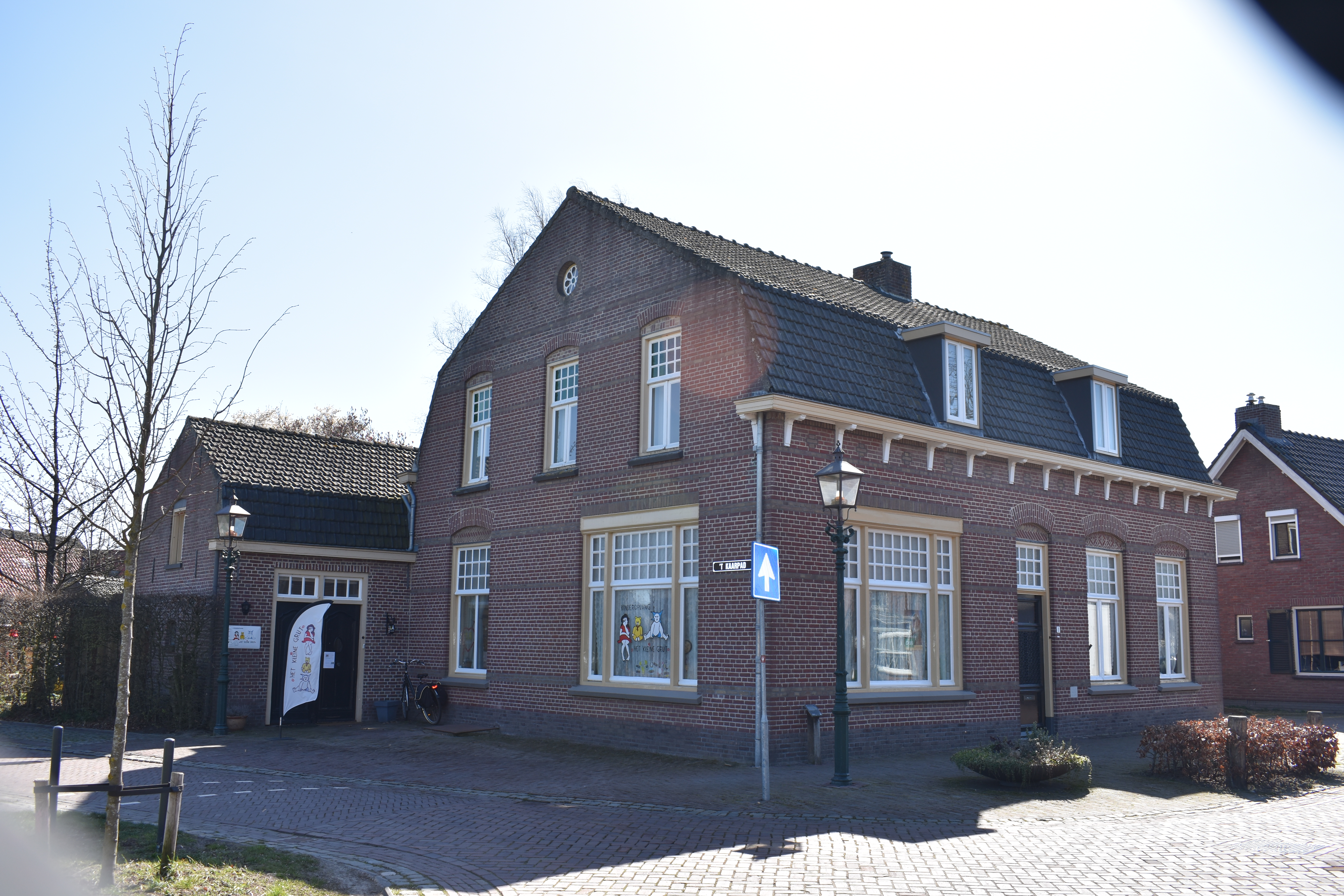
House in Liempde
