= Patrice Riemens =

Dutch activist, politician (born 1950)

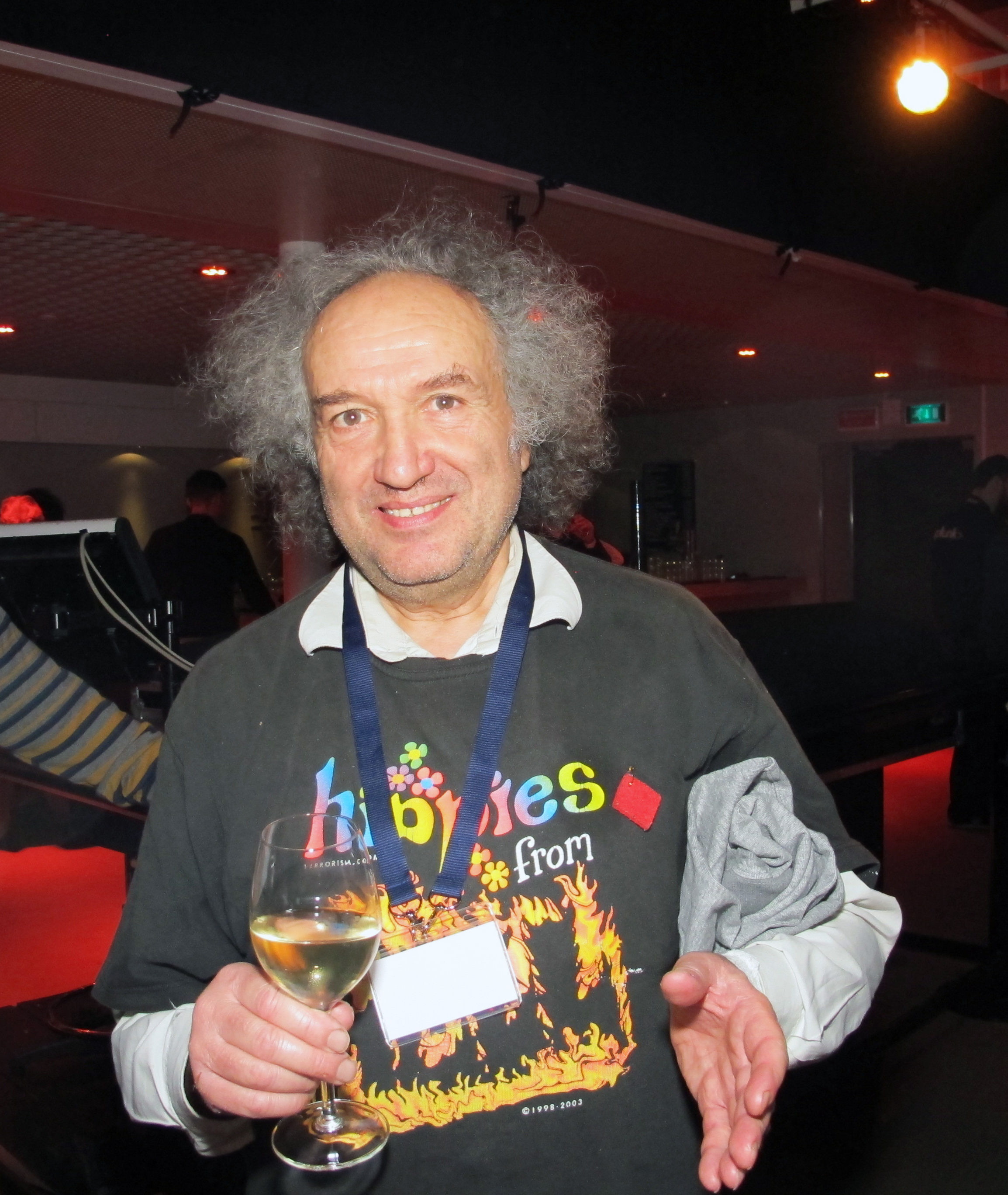
Patrice Riemens

Patrice Riemens (born 1950) is a geographer and currently the Fellow of the Waag Society in Amsterdam. He is a promoter of Open Knowledge and Free Software, and has been involved as a "FLOSSopher" (a 'philosopher' of the Free/Libre and Open Source Software movements) at the Asia Source and Africa Source camps, held in 2005 and 2006 to promote FLOSS among non-governmental organisations. He is a member of the staff of Multitudes.

Riemens' has been described as a "private intellectual (and sometimes internet activist) by choosing". De Waag Center for Old and New Media where he is based, in De Waag, a 15th-century building in Amsterdam and works on the cutting edge of technology, culture, education and industry.
