= Still Hacking Anyway =

Hacker convention in the Netherlands

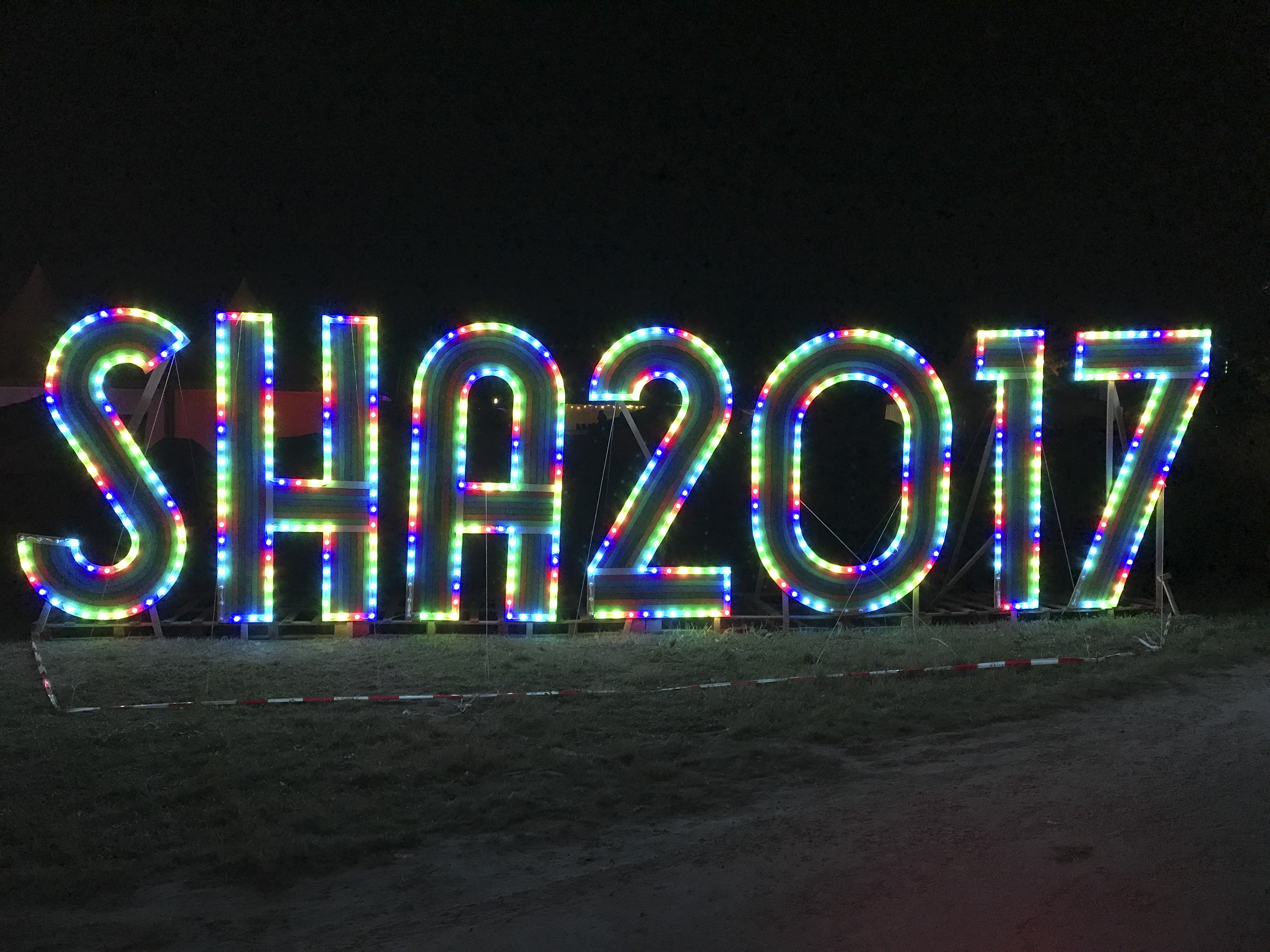
- Genre: Hacker con
- Begins: August 4, 2017
- Ends: August 8, 2017
- Frequency: quadrennial (every 4 years)
- Locations: Zeewolde, Netherlands
- Inaugurated: 1989
- Previous event: Observe. Hack. Make. (2013)
- Next event: May Contain Hackers (2022)
- Attendance: 3300 tickets sold
- Website: https://sha2017.org

Still Hacking Anyway, abbreviated SHA2017 (Note: perhaps to mimic the designators of the Secure Hash Algorithm series of cryptographic hash functions) was a hacker conference and festival in The Netherlands. It is part of the quadrennial hacker camps that started in 1989 with the Galactic Hacker Party in Amsterdam.

The camp took place from 4 to 8 August on a scouts terrain in Zeewolde. At least 3300 hackers and technology minded people from 50 countries participated in workshops and discussions. Participants had Gigabit Ethernet through Datenklos (new chemical toilets with Ethernet switches). A radiostation with FM license and a GSM tower were also built. During the camp, lectures and workshops were held in different tents, including talks from PGP founder Phil Zimmermann and William Binney. Recordings of talks can be found on the streaming portal of the Chaos Computer Club, at https://media.ccc.de/c/SHA2017.
