= Geestmerambacht =

Recreation area in North Holland

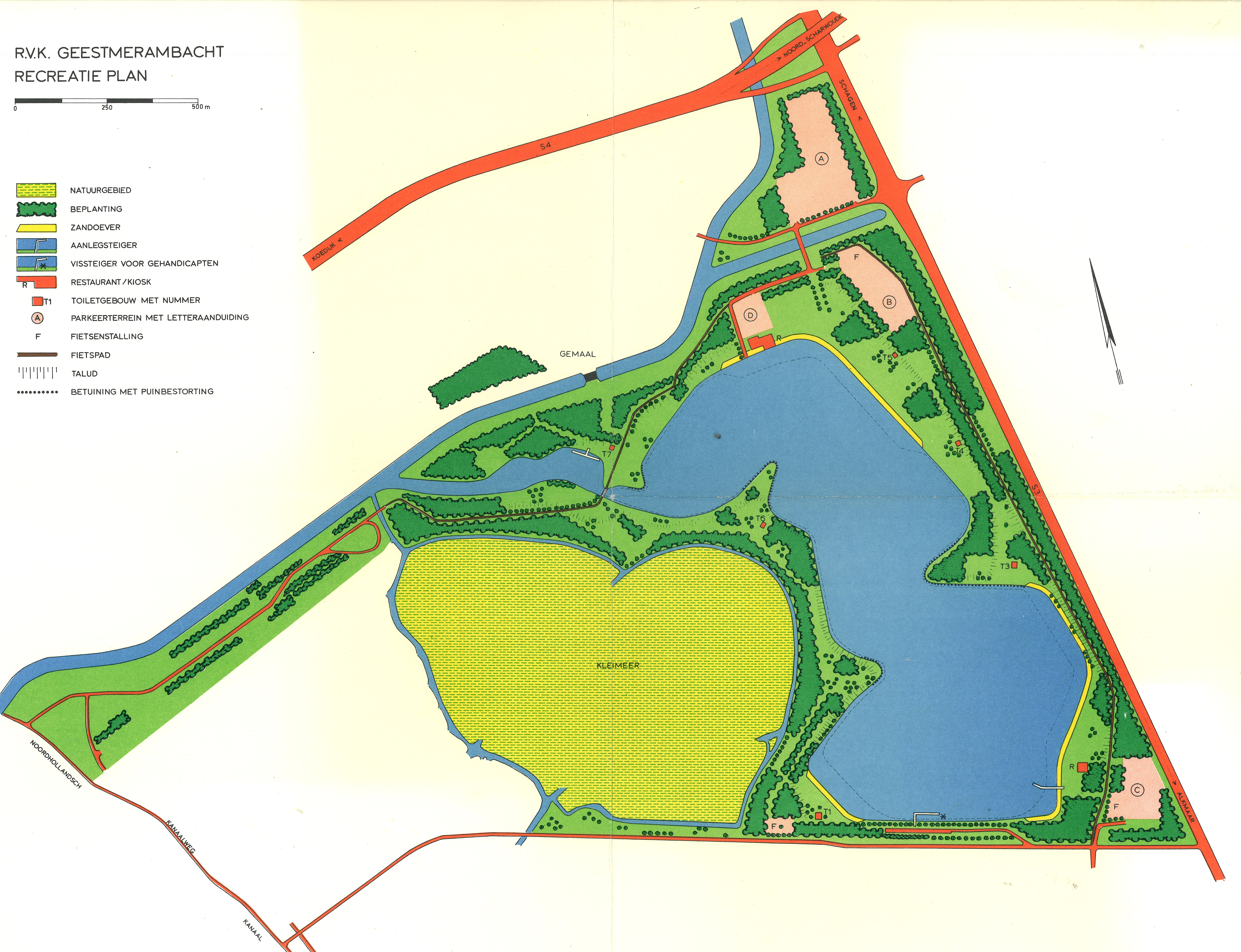
Geestmerambacht recreation plan

Geestmerambacht is a recreation area located on the western side of the municipality of Dijk and Waard in the Dutch province of North Holland.

The area is built around the Summer Delella, a large lake surrounded by meadows and bushes. The area is approximately 200 hectares, including 40 hectares of forest with hiking and biking trails and 75 hectares of bathing water quality. There is room for holding events; annual festivals are Indian Summer Festival and Liquicity. Around the lake there are facilities for relaxation on and by the water, including sandy beaches and sunscreens.

The area is managed by Recreation North Holland NV. The recreation is a partnership based on the Common Regulations Act making this a Dutch inter-municipal public body arrangement, and is governed by the municipalities of Alkmaar, Bergen and Dijk and Waard.

== History ==
The construction of Geestmerambacht took place in the 1960s as part of a land consolidation and because of the need for sand extraction. Groot Geestmerambacht was previously a contiguous area of sailing polders with thousands of islands in which arable farming was operated. Land consolidation created a large-scale modern agricultural area that was accessible by roads. The current recreation area, which was primarily intended for amphibious recreation, lies in the middle of it.

== Recreation ==
The area includes facilities for water recreation, hiking, and mountain biking.
