= Datenklo =

Cubicles for connectivity at hacker camps

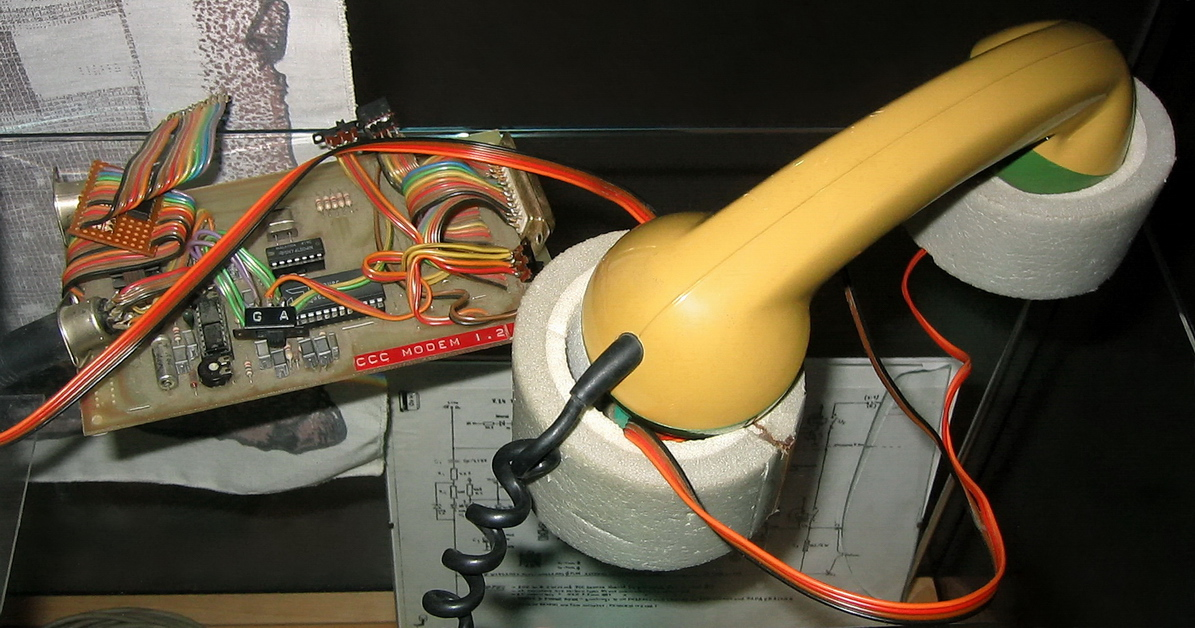
The Datenklo modem

The Datenklo (German; lit. 'data toilet') or CCC-Modem was an acoustic coupler modem in the early 1980s for which the Chaos Computer Club made plans and schematics available. The name refers to the use of readily available toilet plumbing cuffs to fit the telephone receiver.

The meaning of the name changed in the 1990s, when portable toilet cubicles were re-purposed to provide connectivity at hacker camps in Europe.

== History of the modem ==
The original Datenklo was an acoustic coupler modem for self-assembly. Its name was coined with the schematics provided by the Hacker Bible published by the Chaos Computer Club. The goal of this acoustically-coupled device was to avoid prosecution for the (illegal at the time) connection of an unlicensed device to the telephone line. Compared to certified and legal modems of the time, the Datenklo was comparatively cheap and used the existing landline telephone, making it usable even in a public telephone booth.

== Camp infrastructure ==
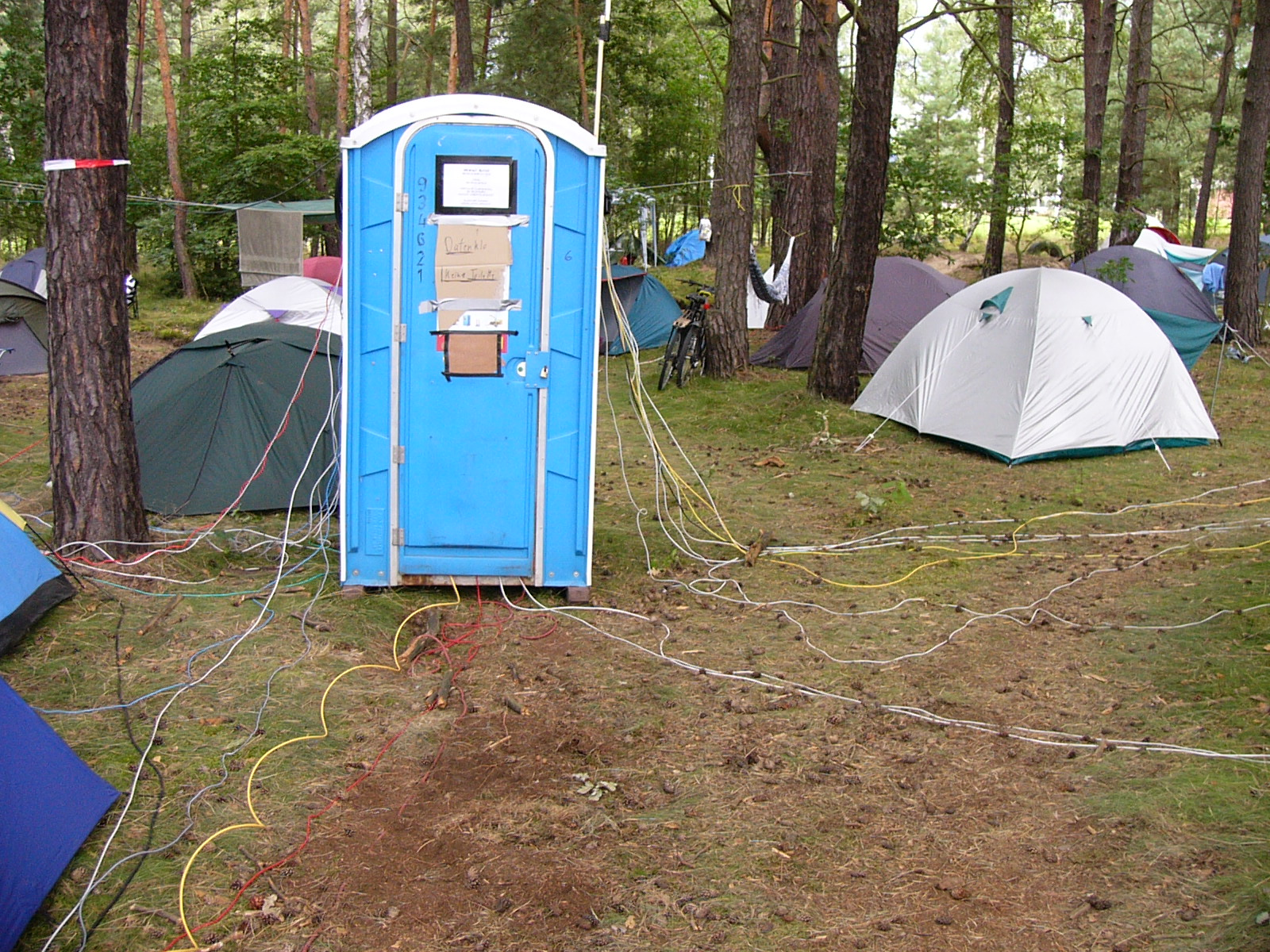
Tents and a "Datenklo" (German, in English "data loo") at the Chaos Communication Camp, Finowfurt 2007

The Datenklo name was subsequently repurposed to describe the use of rented portable toilet cubicles to host communications infrastructure at hacker camps. These re-purposed provide connectivity at hacker camps. This typically includes Wi-Fi and wired communication such as Ethernet. A major event can be served by many data toilets: for example, in 1999 the Chaos Communication Camp had 17 booths.

== Connectivity ==
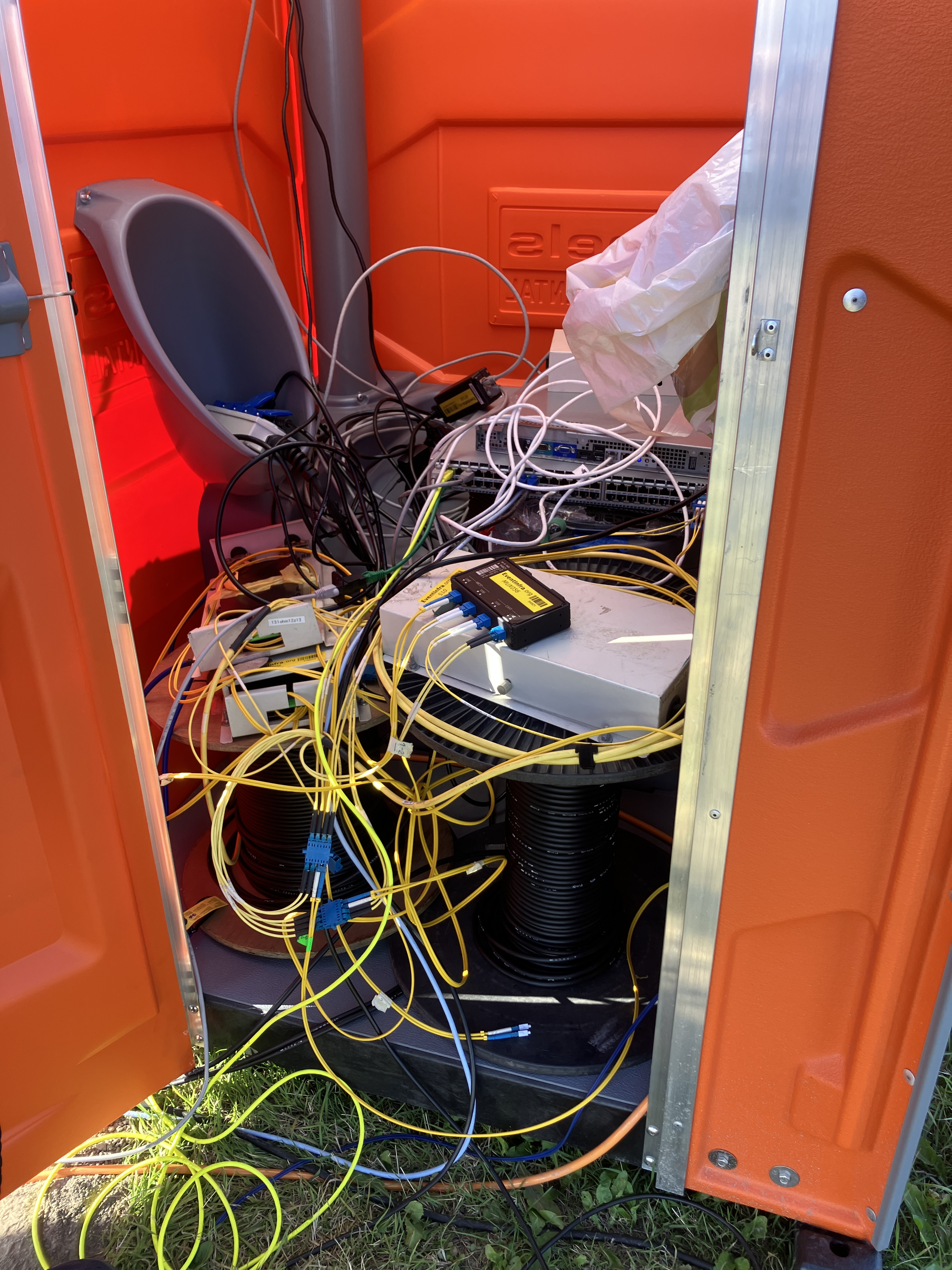
Datenklo interior at WHY2025

A typical Datenklo provides a temporary wiring closet for the networking equipment required to deliver pervasive connectivity to hacker camp attendees. They are considered well suited for the demands of an outdoor camp, since they are lightweight and easy to transport, they offer good ventilation, weather protection and are easily locked. Their size allow housing for the typical 19" rack form factor of network infrastructure gear.

Datenklos are interconnected to create the site network, with hacker camp attendees asked to bring their own cables if they would like a wired connection to their tent: Modern iterations show network status and connectivity through the colours of led stripes mounted on top.

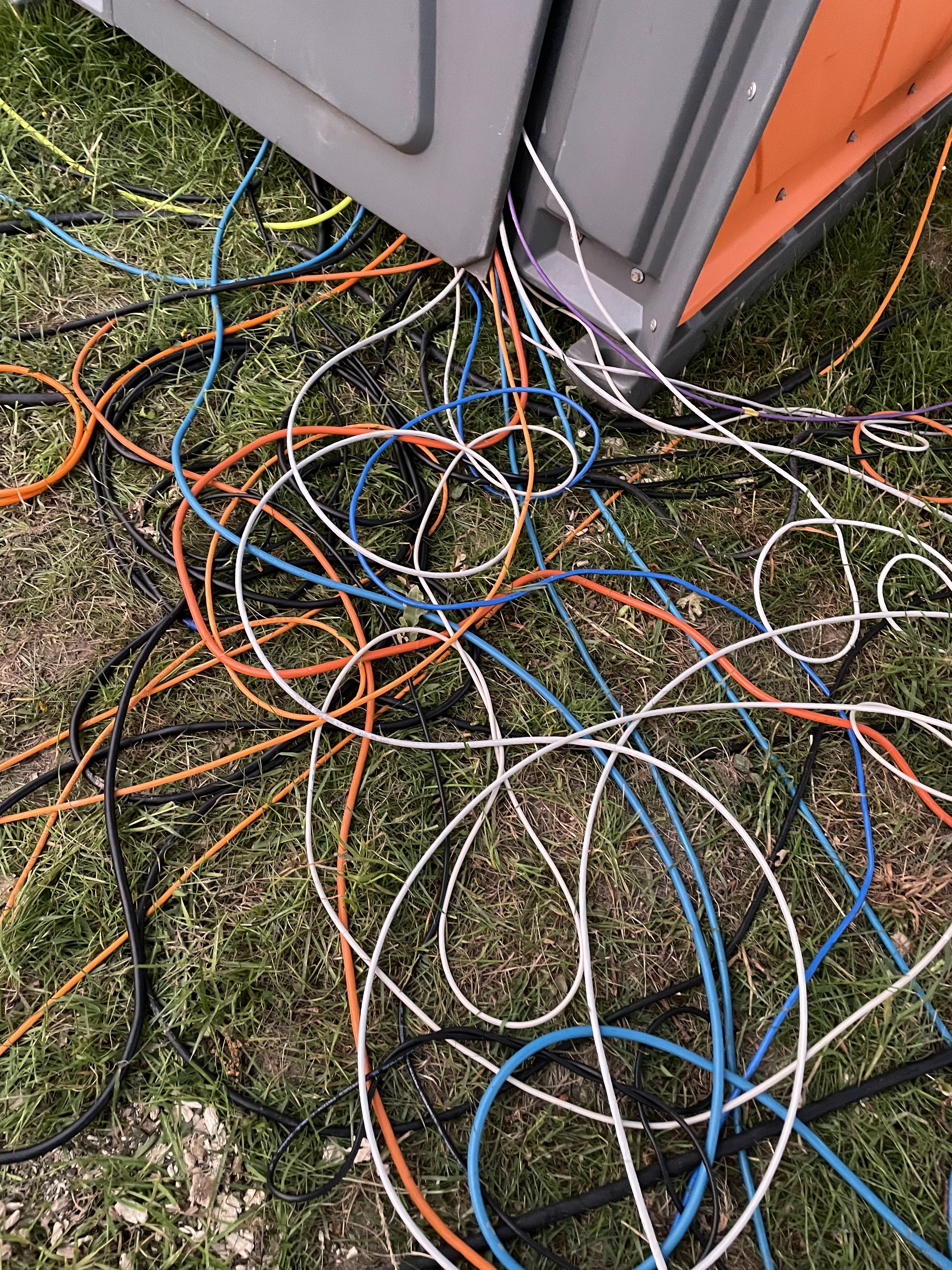
Photo of a Datenklo "data toilet" at Electromagnetic Field 2022 hacker camp

== The role of Angels ==
Hacker camps are generally organized and run by volunteers known as angels, and the Network Operation Centre angels not only create the network as part of site build-up and tear it down afterwards, but also connect attendees' cables to the switches in the Datenklo.

Many other roles exist for angels:

While the most obvious angels to most attendees are the helpers operating the cashdesk, checking wristbands at the doors, or selling drinks at the bars, there are many of tasks to be done "behind the scenes" that are barely noticeable (or only become visible when something goes wrong).

== Back to the future ==
Whilst wireless networking and Internet protocols have become the norm for voice and data communication, the Datenklo provides hacker camp attendees with the opportunity to build and learn about Plain Old Telephone Service (POTS), turning the Datenklo into a "phone box" of sorts:

One of the most popular functions turned out to be faxing, with around 17 attendees bringing a fax machine and 200+ faxes sent, 100 of which went to @EMFFacsimile - a Fax to Twitter Gateway. A couple of attendees also bought Apple Newton PDAs and modems and got rather excited when they faxed between themselves, possibly for the first time in 30 years.

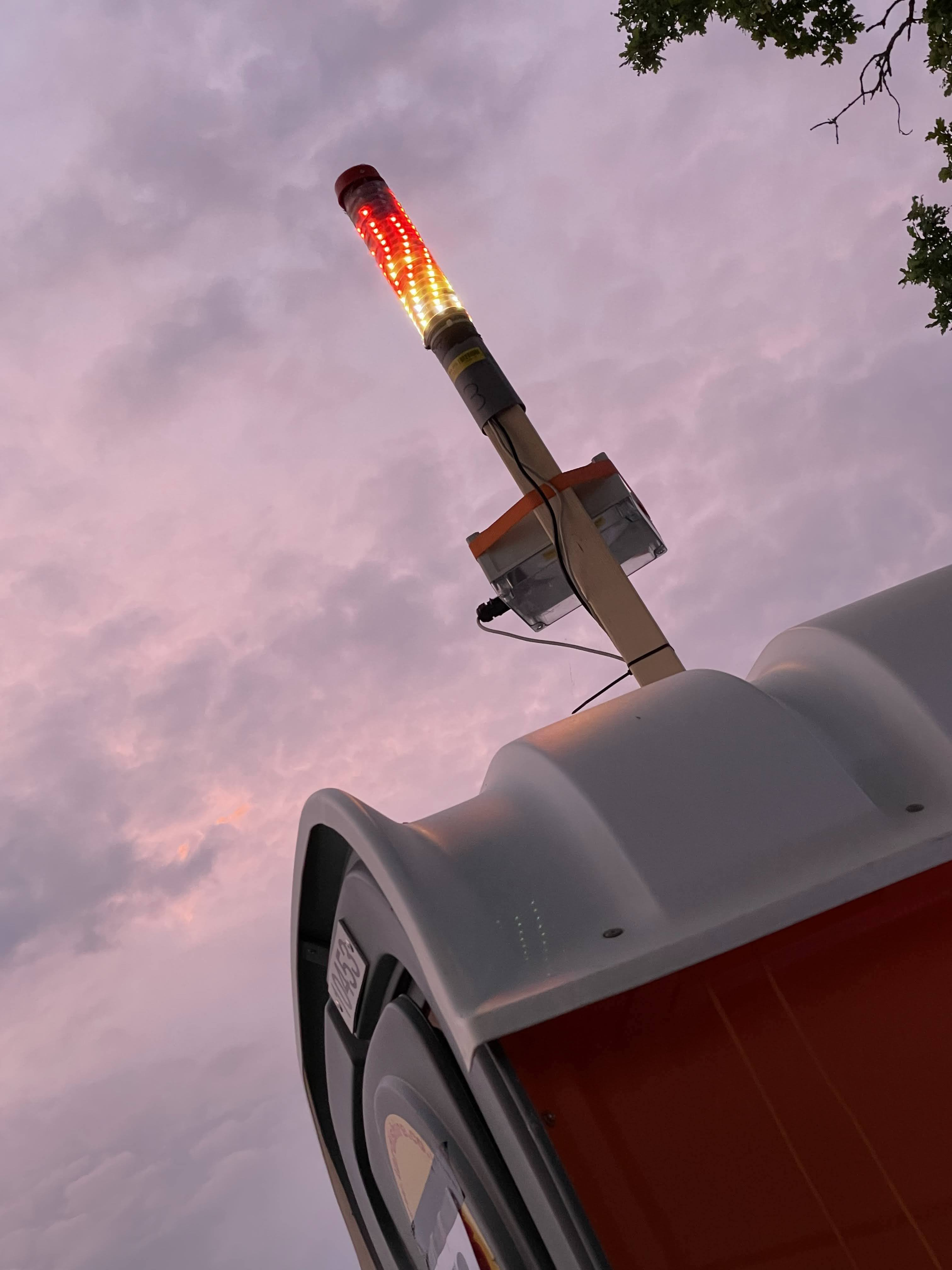
Photo of a Datenklo "data toilet" at Electromagnetic Field 2022 hacker camp

== Sources ==
- Denker, Kai (2014). "Heroes Yet Criminals of the German Computer Revolution". Hacking Europe. History of Computing. London: Springer London. pp. 167–187. doi:10.1007/978-1-4471-5493-8_8. ISBN 978-1-4471-5492-1.
