= Chemical toilet =

Toilet that collects waste in a holding tank and uses chemicals to minimize odors

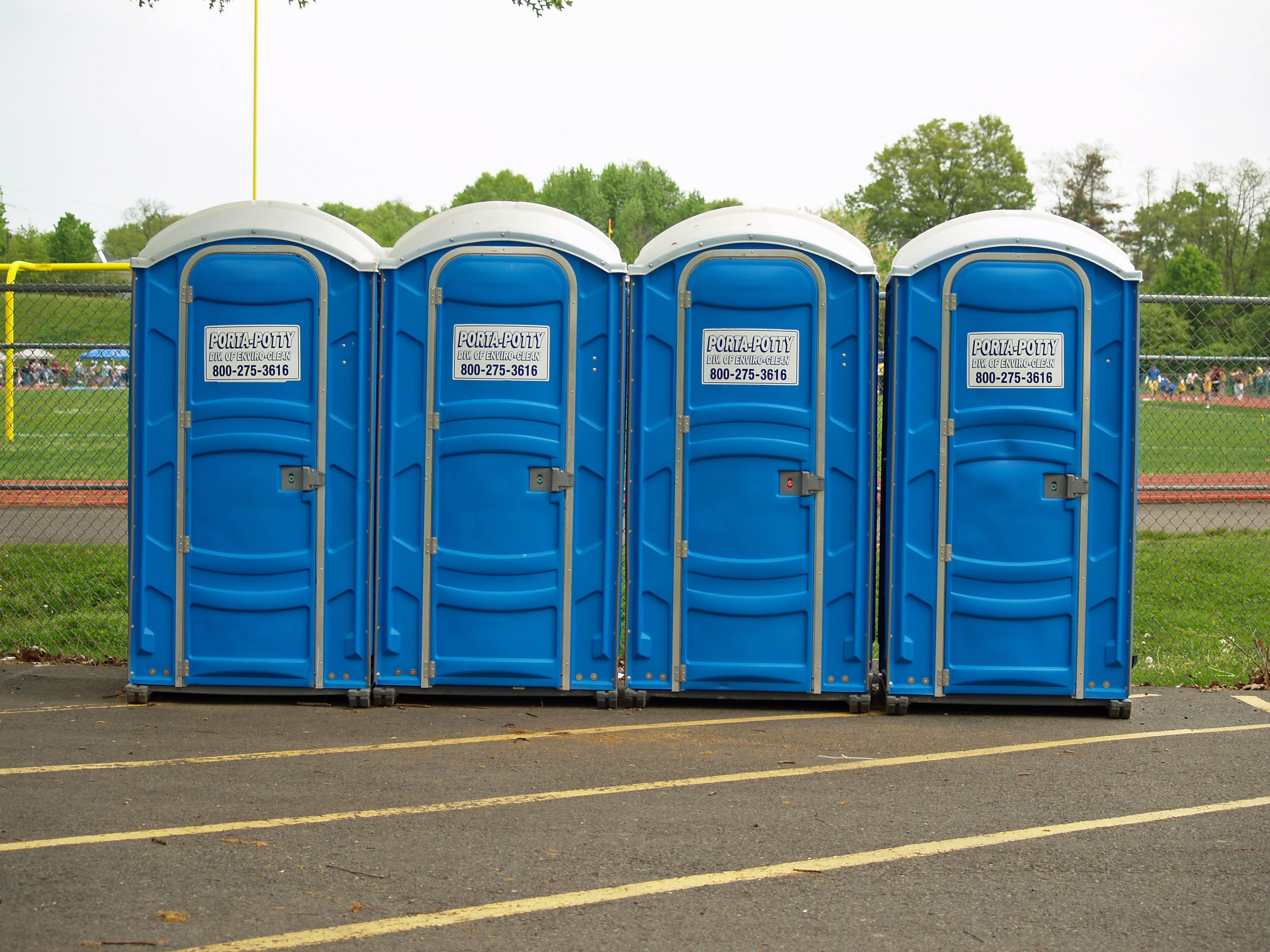
A line of portable chemical toilets

A chemical toilet collects human waste in a holding tank and uses chemicals to minimize odors. They do not require a connection to a water supply and are used in a wide variety of situations. These toilets are usually, but not always, self-contained and movable. A chemical toilet is structured around a relatively small tank, which requires frequent emptying. It is not connected to a hole in the ground (like a pit latrine), nor to a septic tank, nor is it plumbed into a municipal system leading to a sewage treatment plant. When the tank is emptied, the contents are usually pumped into a sanitary sewer or directly to a treatment plant.

The enclosed portable toilets used on construction sites and at large gatherings such as music festivals are well-known types of chemical toilets. As they are usually used for short periods and because of their high prices, they are mostly rented rather than bought, often including servicing and cleaning.

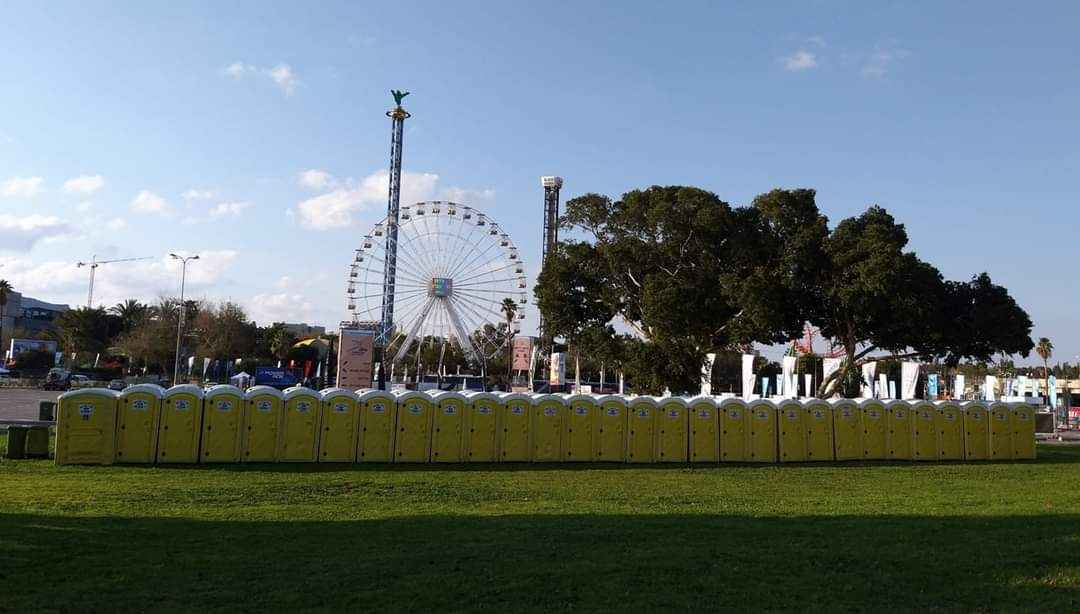
A row of portable toilets in Israel

A simpler, unenclosed, chemical toilet may be used in camping, travel trailers (caravans) and on small boats.

Many chemical toilets use a blue dye in the bowl water. In the past, disinfection was generally carried out by mixing formaldehyde, bleach, or similar chemicals with the toilet water when flushed. Modern formulations are nitrate-based and work biologically.

== Names ==
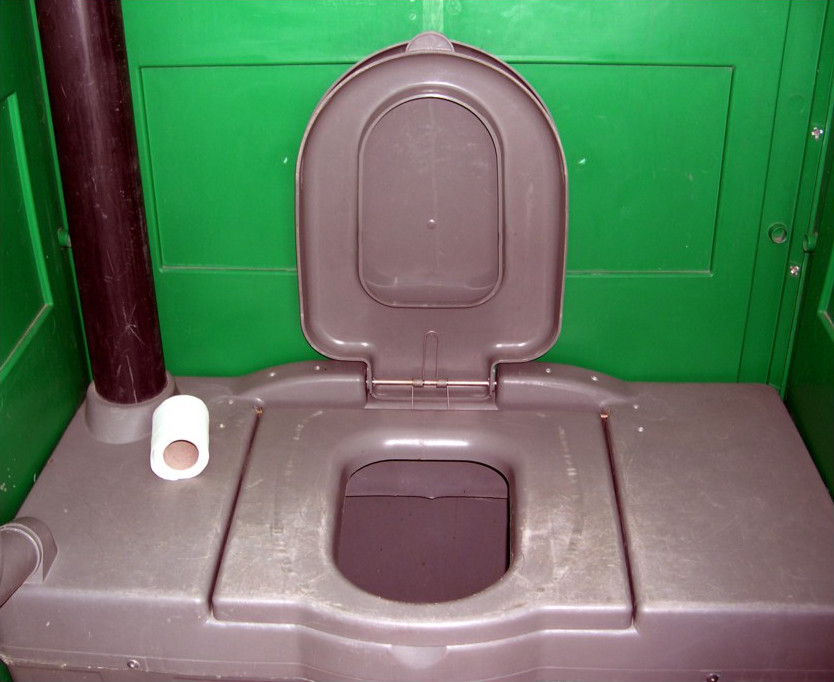
Interior view of a chemical toilet in Baghdad, Iraq

Chemical toilets are a type of portable toilet and are also known by various tradenames, such as Port-a-John and Porta-Potty (American English), Portaloo (British English), honey bucket, the lavatory, or sanican. The last three are the names of companies and "Portaloo" is a British and European Community registered trade mark.

== Designs ==
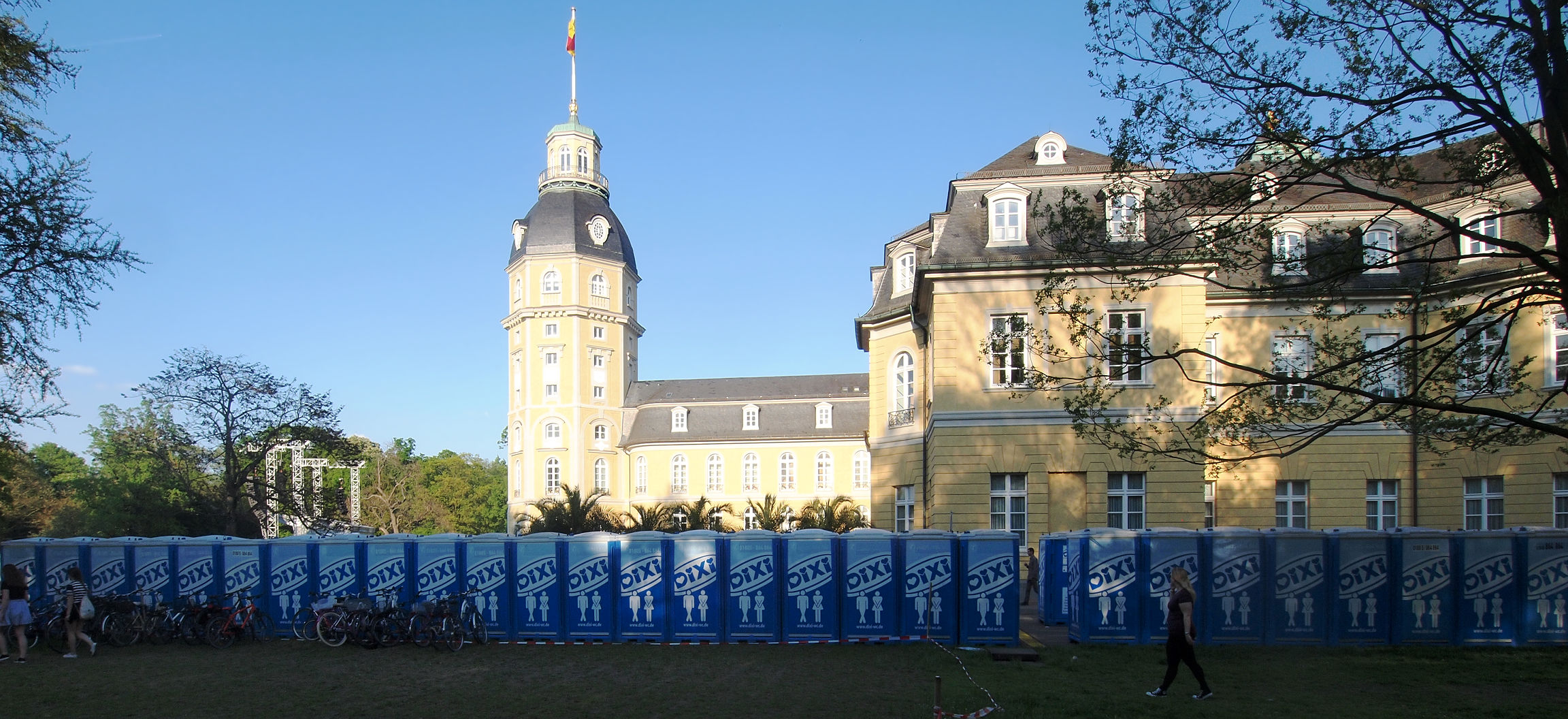
A long row of chemical toilets at Karlsruhe Palace, Germany

Enclosed chemical toilets are often used as a temporary solution, for example on construction sites or large gatherings, because of their durability and convenience. Most chemical toilets have black open-front U-shaped toilet seats with a cover. They are often constructed out of lightweight molded plastic or fiberglass. Most include lockable doors.

While chemical toilet units are typically freestanding structures, their stability is augmented by the weight of the waste tank, which usually contains an empty liquid disinfectant dispenser and deodorizer. They can also be staked down to withstand high winds.

In countries which use squat toilets, portable toilets also come in squat versions, with only the shoes touching a potentially soiled surface. Hybrid toilet designs, where users can squat or swing down a seat to sit on, have not been developed for portable toilets.

Most include ventilation near the top, and a vent pipe for the holding tank. When wind is blowing over the vent pipe, it creates a low pressure area sucking the odor out, and leaving the toilet lid open will reverse the flow of the venting of the tank.

=== Size ===
Chemical toilets are large enough for a single occupant, usually about 110 cm (43 in) square by 210 cm (83 in) high.

Typical specifications:

- Weight: 90–110 kg (200–240 lb)
- Width: 1,166 mm (45.9 in)
- Depth: 1,215 mm (47.8 in)
- Height: 2,316 mm (91.2 in)
- Door height: 1,975 mm (77.8 in)
- Door width: 639 mm (25.2 in)

A smaller version would be 1 meter square (39 inches). A version for people with disabilities would be at least 1,422 mm (56.0 in) by 1,524 mm (60.0 in), with a door width of at least 813 mm (32.0 in).

=== Variations ===
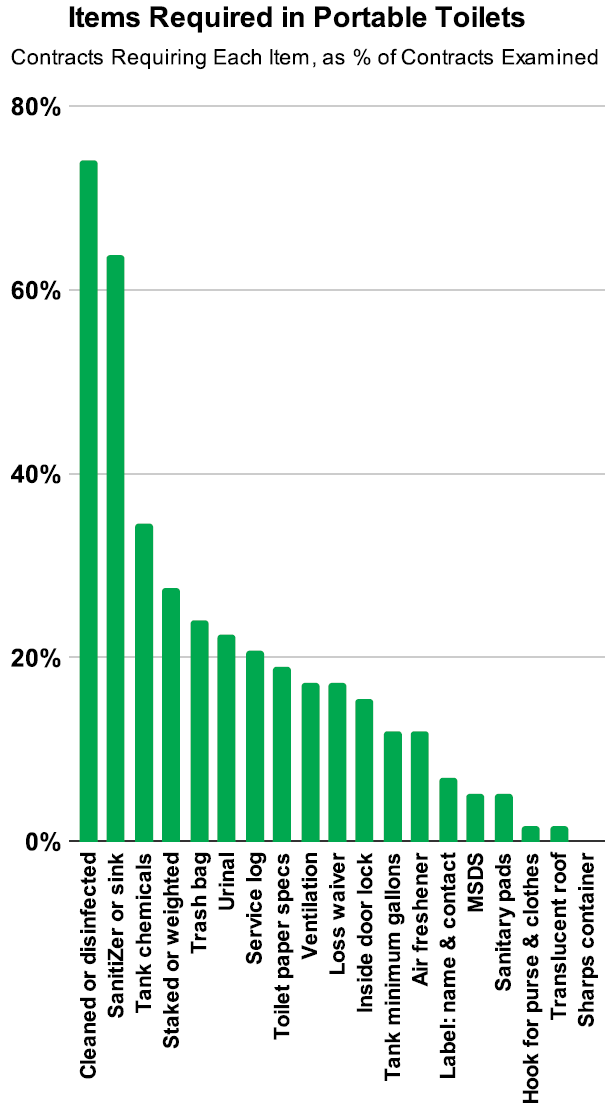
Items required in contracts for portable toilets

Models can include a urinal, to keep urine away from the seat, air fresheners, a translucent roof for light, a hook to keep purse, tool belt, or jacket off the floor, and antibacterial hand sanitizer dispensers or sinks with soap and paper towels. It has become common for portable toilets to be paired with a separate hand washing station. These sink stations provide a foot pump to dispense non-potable water to wash one's hands with provided soap dispensers or hand sanitizer stations after using the toilet, along with paper towels. Some toilets have a dispenser for menstrual products and trash receptacles for menstrual and incontinence products and other trash to keep them out of the waste tank.

Government and private standards are minimal and do not require any of these features.

=== Toilet trailers ===
Portable toilets on trailers are known as "toilet trailers". These trailers are typically found in 1–2 toilet configurations with a hand wash ability using either a hand washing station or a plastic barrel full of water. These trailers are often seen on agricultural fields or at road construction sites. These restrooms are ideal for situations where the workers (users) are very mobile. However, this configuration has proven problematic; most modern portable toilet waste tank designs have proven inadequate to deal with the common problem of splash-outs from the waste holding tank while being towed down bumpy roads. Also, when being towed, the high winds blow in from the vents, creating a hurricane effect inside and ejecting any toilet paper rolls from the portable toilet if not secured.

"Luxury" portable toilets also exist. They are typically mounted on large "office-like" trailers or made from converted shipping containers. They contain every amenity that a public toilet would have such as running water, flushing toilet, stalls, urinals, mirrors, lighting, and even air conditioning and hot water in some cases. However, these luxuries come at a price as these trailers typically cost multiple times more than a typical portable toilet to buy or rent. They are commonly found at weddings, high end events/charities, and movie shoots.

The chemical toilets used in film shoots are known as honeywagons.

=== Camping toilets ===
A portable camping toilet has a seat and a small waste tank. Adding a packet of chemicals to the waste tank reduces odors and bacteria, until the waste can be dumped at an appropriate facility. They are used in camping, travel trailers, caravans, and camper vans. They may also be used on small boats which lack a built-in marine toilet.

They are also referred to as "cassette toilet" or "camping toilet", or under brand names that have become generic trademarks. The Oxford English Dictionary lists "Porta Potti" ("with arbitrary respelling") as "A proprietary name for: a portable toilet, as used by campers", and gives mostly American examples from 1968. The OED gives this proprietary name a second meaning, "a small prefabricated unit containing a toilet, designed for easy transportation and temporary installation esp. outdoors".

The other name common in British English is "Elsan", which dates back to 1925. According to the Camping and Caravanning Club, "Today you will often see campsites refer to their Disposal Points as Elsan Disposal Points because of the history and popularity of the brand." The Canal and River Trust uses both brand names, in lieu of any unbranded term.

One colloquialism for these simple toilets is the "bucket and chuck it" system, although in fact they no longer resemble an open bucket (see bucket toilet). These are designed to be emptied into sanitary stations connected to the regular sewage system. These toilets are not to be confused with the types that are plumbed in to the vehicle and need to be pumped out at holding tank dump stations.

== Chemicals ==
Portable chemical toilets typically use a mixture of several different chemicals in the holding tank.

A blue dye is added to conceal the contents of the tank from the user, as well as to provide a visual indicator of capacity. When enough urine and/or feces (yellow to brown) are deposited, the overall mixture takes on a green color which indicates that the tank is full, and should be emptied.

Fragrances and associated surfactants are usually included.

Biocides are added in an effort to control odor by suppressing microbial growth (particularly of gram-positive bacteria). Milder forms include ethanol and quaternary ammonium compounds in low concentration.

A formaldehyde based chemical was used for this purpose in the past, but environmental and health concerns have led to its phase-out in chemical toilets. Formaldehyde is very irritating to the eyes, ears, skin, nose, and throat, and in addition to vapor inhalation, the chemical solution can splash back onto the buttocks of the user when their excrement drops in. Formaldehyde is also highly toxic to aquatic life and can be difficult for wastewater treatment plants to dispose of safely.

In modern chemical toilets, microbial and enzymatic agents are increasingly common. These effectively reduce odor by accelerating digestion and breakdown of the waste, without relying on toxic additives or concealment with fragrances alone. Some can also break down toilet paper as well.

All of the above ingredients may have a limited lifespan (e.g., 7 days), requiring frequent replacement to maintain efficacy.

A much older form of portable toilet chemical is lye. Lye was used during the old "wooden outhouse days" to prevent odors. After a person is done using the portable toilet they would sprinkle a bit of lye into the holding tank. Lye can be dangerously corrosive to skin, and is rarely used today.

== Locations ==
Chemical toilets at a public event in Jersey

Enclosed chemical toilets are frequently seen at outdoor work sites, particularly construction sites, farms, ranches, and camp sites. Large banks of dozens of portable toilets allow for ready sanitation at large gatherings such as outdoor music festivals. Several portable toilets arranged in these large banks are referred to as a 'sitting' of portable toilets.

== Market size ==
In the United States, the chemical toilet industry is a $2 billion a year business with standard models starting at $68 per day at California wildfires or $225 per day in New York City. Luxury restroom trailer units with flushing toilets cost a few thousand dollars delivered a long distance in New York state.

== Advantages ==
Though more expensive than a standard permanent outdoor latrine, portable toilets have several significant benefits mostly related to their portability; as they are self-contained, they can be placed almost anywhere. Portable toilets without enclosures can be carried in cars, and toilets with enclosures can be hauled in the back of pick-up trucks. Some corporations manufacture special trucks for this purpose.

Portable toilets reduce open defecation. With their enclosure, they offer privacy on the toilet. If they lack a sink, they often also lack a trash receptacle which can be useful when people use nonflushable wipes to clean the seat, but they still can be suitable for the need to dispose of used menstrual and incontinence products in privacy. Males often may choose to urinate elsewhere for personal convenience, to avoid germs, to shorten queues, to improve efficiency at night, or to prevent the toilets from filling up too quickly.

== Disadvantages ==
Because portable toilets are not plumbed, they keep the waste inside the tank; this can lead to a sewage smell if the portable toilet is not cleaned properly or is overused. They may also be seen as an eyesore in most communities, some of which prohibit the use of a portable toilet without special permission from the city or municipality.

Another disadvantage is that regular portable toilets are not wheelchair accessible, meaning that disabled people that use wheelchairs may find using portable toilets difficult or impossible. However, most modern companies offer wheel chair accessible portable toilets upon request.

== Society and culture ==
=== Use in outdoor advertising ===
Portable toilets may be used to display outdoor advertising. Some advertisers wrap portable toilets with vinyl material similar to that commonly used on cars and buses.

== History ==
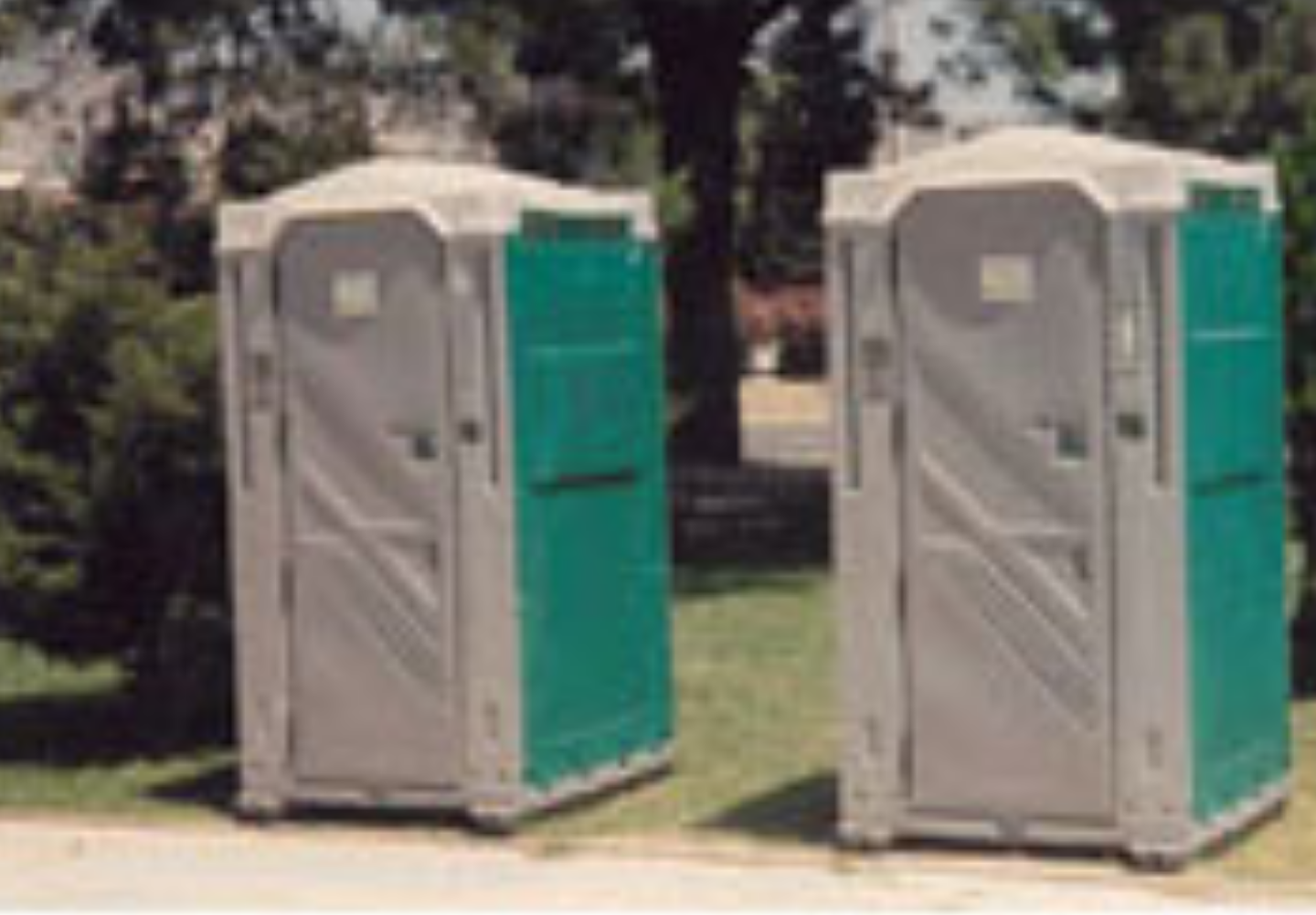
American-produced portable toilets in Greece in 1996

The first US patent for a polyethylene plastic portable toilet was issued in the 1950s to Harvey Heather, the founder of United Sanitation. This "strong box" was a solid, molded, stand-alone chemical toilet. The second US patent for a polyethylene plastic portable toilet was in the 1960s to George Harding, a co-founder of PolyJohn Corporation with Ed Cooper and George Hiskes.

In the mid 1960s PolyJohn was importing these toilets in to the UK under the Portaloo name and by the early 1970s they realized they needed a UK manufacturer of chemicals for their toilets. Working in partnership with Doug Holt & Robert Frazer, the owners of Repclif Chemical Services Ltd now Qualkem Ltd, the Destrol brand was born. Destrol quickly became the main brand with product being sold across the globe, servicing toilets with Destrol Bio-Concentrate & Destrol 6.

Its predecessors include the Victorian thunderbox, the bucket toilet and the pit latrine. The shape of the structure resembles a privy (outhouse), but there is no hole dug beneath it.

== See also ==
- Bucket toilet
- Composting toilet
- Pollee, a portable urinal for females
- Sanitation
