= Oudkarspel =

Farm village in the Netherlands

- Village
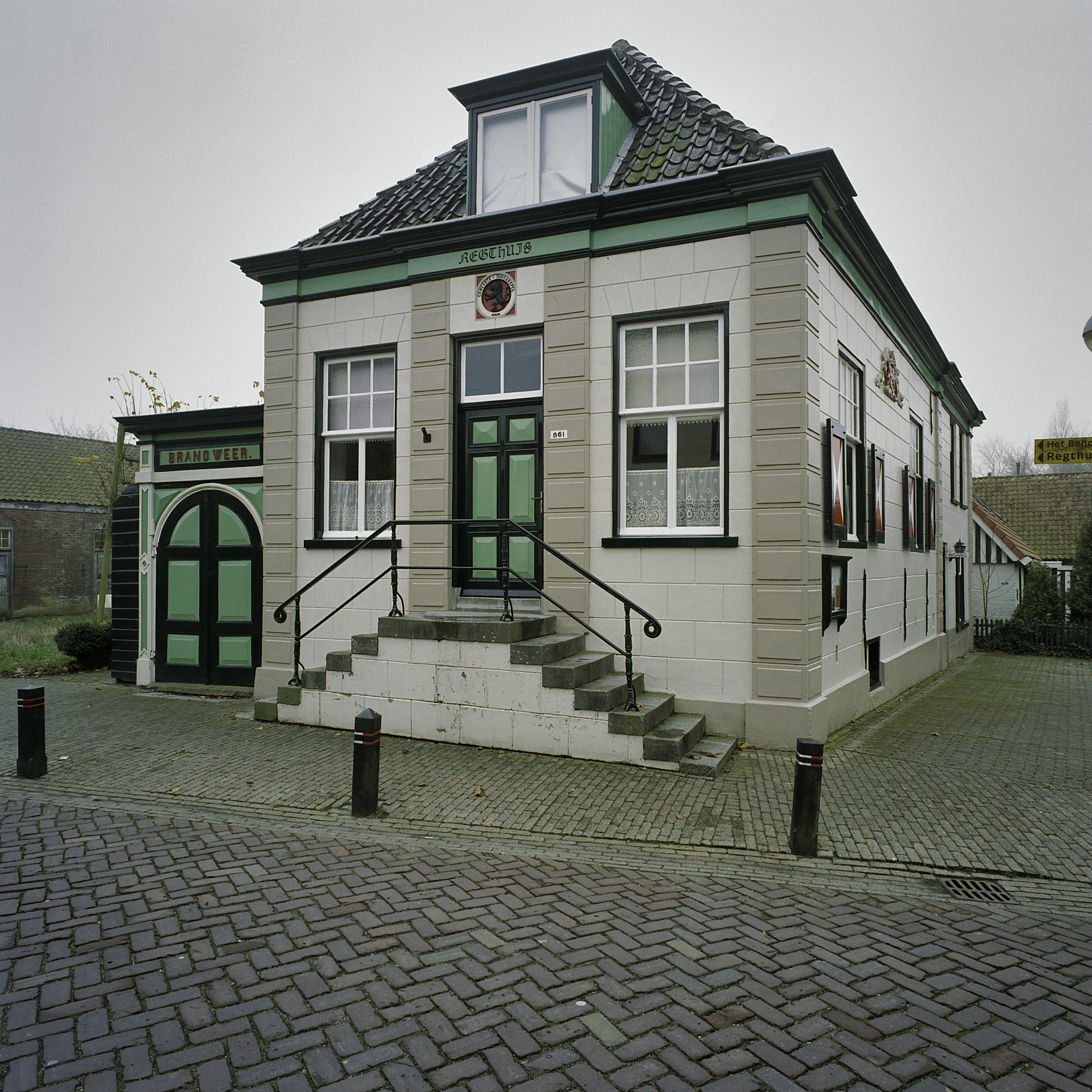
- Former town hall

- Coat of arms

- Location in the Netherlands Location in the province of North Holland in the Netherlands
- Coordinates: 52°42′N 4°48′E
- Country: Netherlands
- Province: North Holland
- Municipality: Dijk en Waard

Area
  - Village: 5.56 km^{2} (2.15 sq mi)
- Elevation: −0.6 m (−2.0 ft)

Population (2025)
  - Village: 3,840
  - Density: 691/km^{2} (1,790/sq mi)
  - Urban: 3,240
  - Rural: 605
- Time zone: UTC+1 (CET)
  - Summer (DST): UTC+2 (CEST)
- Postal code: 1724
- Dialing code: 0226

Oudkarspel is a village in the Dutch province of North Holland. It is located in the municipality of Dijk en Waard, north of Noord-Scharwoude.

== History ==
The village was first mentioned in 1094 as Aldenkercha. The current name means "old parish". Oudkarspel developed in the 11th century a linear settlement along the dike. In 1607, the village became a heerlijkheid and the manor house Oud-Karspel was built around 1640. The estate was damaged by war in 1799 and demolished in 1808.

The Dutch Reformed church is a three aisled basilica-like church. The tower without a spire used to date from the 13th century. In 1969, the church was completely destroyed in a fire, and was rebuilt in a basic style.

Oudkarspel was home to 704 people in 1840. It was a separate municipality until 1941, when the new municipality of Langedijk was created. In 2022, it became part of the new municipality of Dijk en Waard.

== Gallery ==
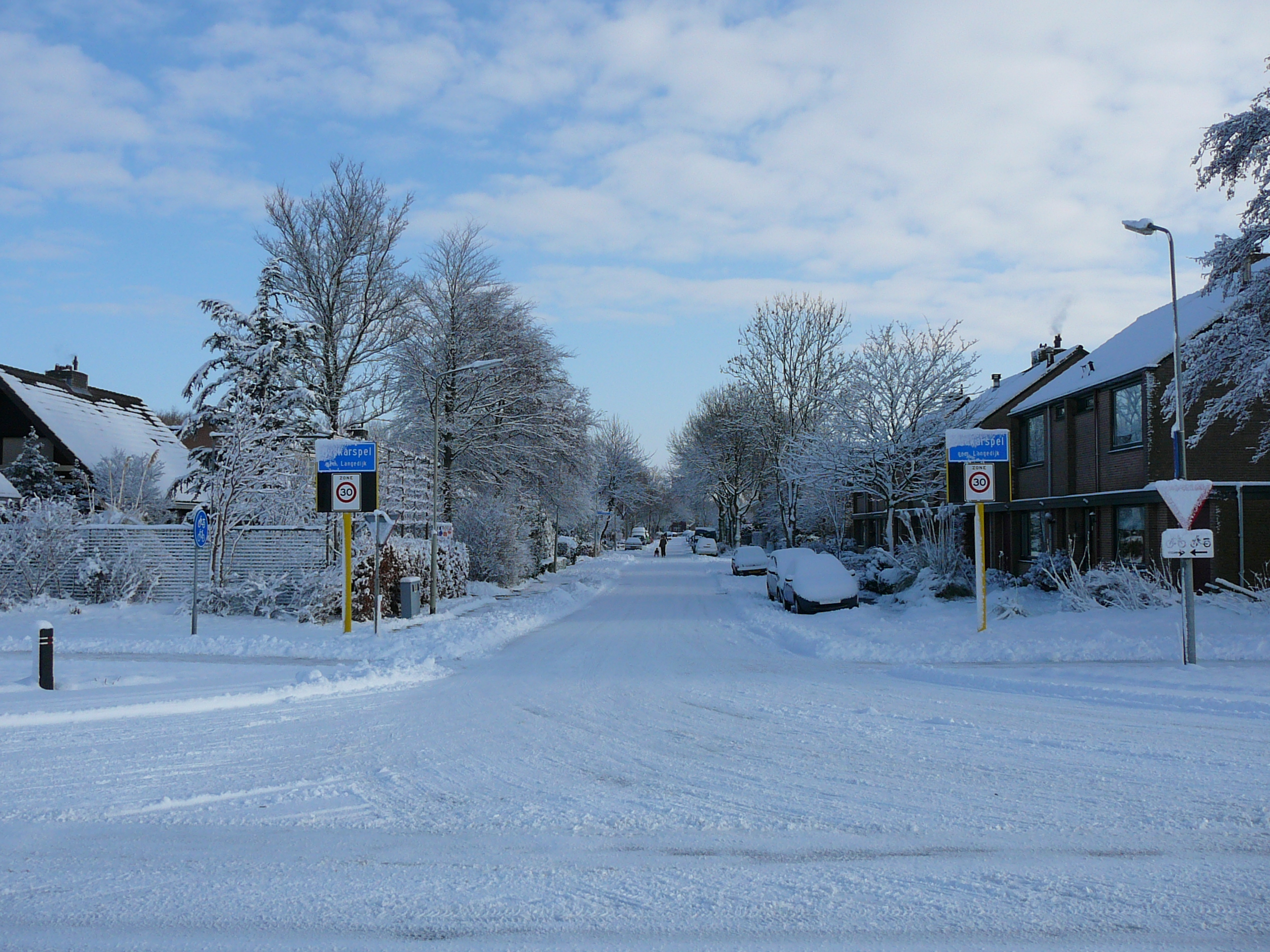
Oudkarspel in winter

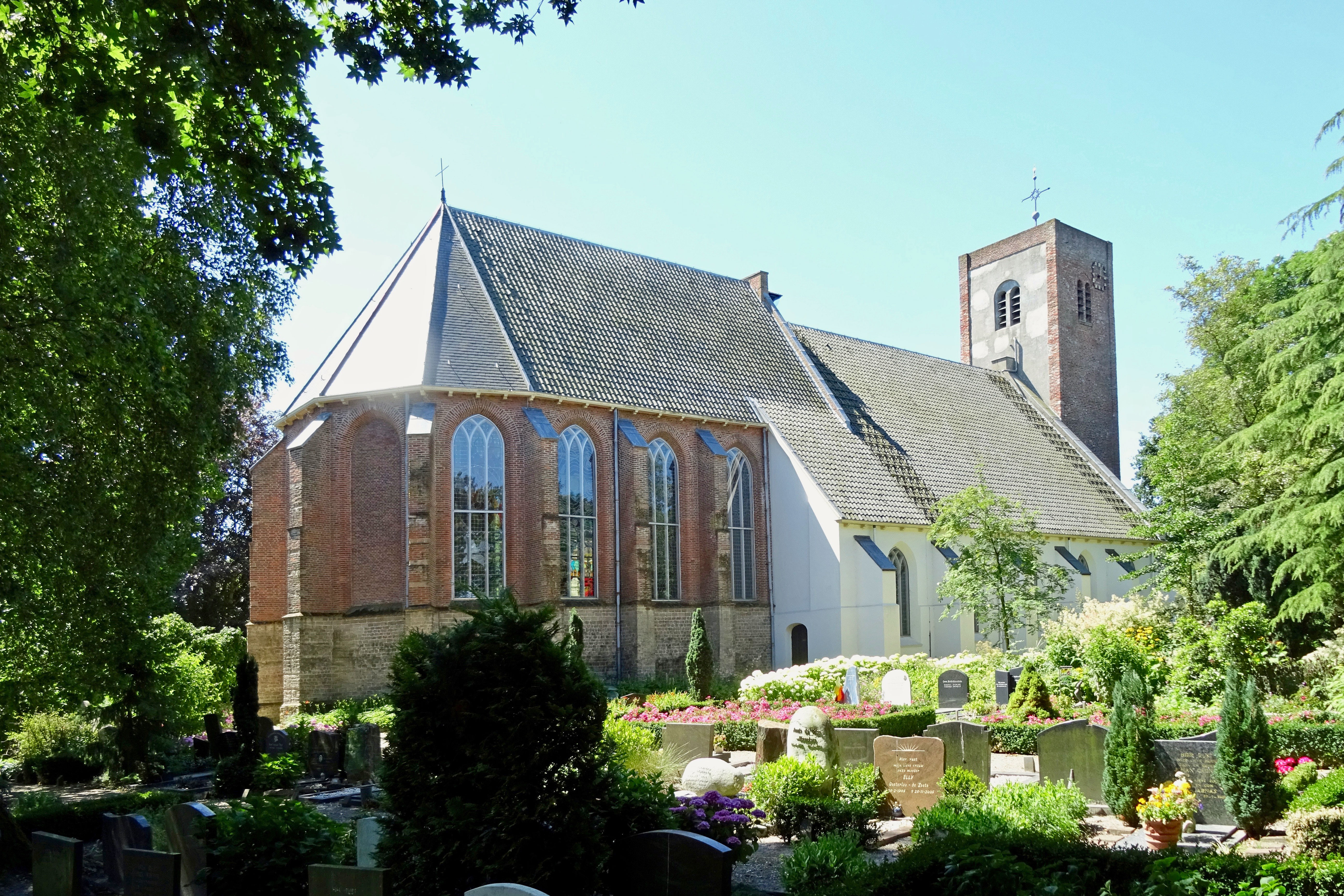
Dutch Reformed church
