= 2025 Middelfart municipal election =

Municipal election in Denmark

← 2021	18 November 2025	2029 →

All 25 seats to the Middelfart municipal council 13 seats needed for a majority
- Turnout: 23,934 (73.7%) ▲2.9%
	First party	Second party	Third party
	A	V	F
Party	Social Democrats	Venstre	Green Left
Last election	11 seats, 40.4%	7 seats, 24.9%	2 seats, 6.7%
Seats won	9	6	2
Seat change	▼2	▼1	0
Popular vote	7,474	5,564	1,883
Percentage	31.8%	23.7%	8.0%
Swing	▼8.6%	▼1.2%	▲1.3%
	Fourth party	Fifth party	Sixth party
	Æ	I	O
Party	Denmark Democrats	Liberal Alliance	Danish People's Party
Last election	Did not stand	Did not stand	1 seat, 4.9%
Seats won	2	2	2
Seat change	▲2	▲2	▲1
Popular vote	1,737	1,625	1,431
Percentage	7.4%	6.9%	6.1%
Swing	New	New	▲1.2%
	Seventh party	Eighth party	Ninth party
	Ø	Å	C
Party	Red-Green Alliance	The Alternative	Conservatives
Last election	1 seat, 4.4%	Did not stand	2 seats, 7.3%
Seats won	1	1	0
Seat change	0	▲1	▼2
Popular vote	795	585	705
Percentage	3.4%	2.5%	3.0%
Swing	▼1.0%	New	▼4.3%
Mayor before election
Johannes Lundsfryd Jensen
Social Democrats
Mayor after election
Anders Møllegård
Venstre

The 2025 Middelfart Municipal election was held on November 18, 2025, in the Danish town of Middelfart, to elect the 25 members to sit in the regional council for the Middelfart Municipal council, in the period of 2026 to 2029. Anders Møllegård from Venstre, would win the mayoral position.

== Background ==
Following the 2021 election, Johannes Lundsfryd Jensen from Social Democrats became mayor for his second term He would run for a third term.

== Electoral system ==
For elections to Danish municipalities, a number varying from 9 to 31 are chosen to be elected to the municipal council. The seats are then allocated using the D'Hondt method and a closed list proportional representation. Middelfart Municipality had 25 seats in 2025.

== Electoral alliances ==
=== Electoral Alliance 1 ===
Party		Political alignment
A	Social Democrats	Centre-left
F	Green Left	Centre-left to Left-wing
M	Moderates	Centre to Centre-right

=== Electoral Alliance 2 ===
Party		Political alignment
C	Conservatives	Centre-right
O	Danish People's Party	Right-wing to Far-right

=== Electoral Alliance 3 ===
Party		Political alignment
I	Liberal Alliance	Centre-right to Right-wing
V	Venstre	Centre-right

=== Electoral Alliance 4 ===
Party		Political alignment
Q	Omsorgsgruppen	Local politics
T	Tværpolitisk Anstændighed	Local politics
Y	Solidarisk ansvar	Local politics
Ø	Red-Green Alliance	Left-wing to Far-Left
Å	The Alternative	Centre-left to Left-wing

== Results by polling station ==
Division	A	B	C	F	I	M	O	Q	T	V	Y	Æ	Ø	Å
Division	%	%	%	%	%	%	%	%	%	%	%	%	%	%
Middelfart V	35.6	2.6	3.1	10.9	7.0	1.7	5.3	0.5	1.7	19.6	1.1	4.6	3.8	2.5
Middelfart Ø	35.0	3.3	2.3	9.6	7.8	0.8	6.6	0.5	1.5	19.7	1.2	5.6	2.8	3.1
Strib	33.1	4.2	5.4	7.8	8.0	1.1	4.2	0.2	1.1	24.4	0.6	3.7	2.6	3.5
Hyllehøj	29.9	2.3	2.4	7.8	10.0	0.6	6.7	0.5	1.5	22.7	1.1	7.8	3.2	3.4
Aulby	24.4	3.8	3.0	7.8	7.4	1.0	6.5	0.5	1.4	29.6	0.9	7.4	3.7	2.8
Nørre Aaby	29.0	1.4	2.5	7.6	5.5	0.4	5.9	0.2	5.9	25.3	0.6	8.5	4.9	2.2
Baaring	27.7	2.5	1.2	5.7	5.8	0.5	6.6	0.4	6.1	28.7	0.5	7.4	5.5	1.4
Ejby Skole Samlingssalen	31.9	1.4	2.6	5.4	5.2	0.5	8.2	0.4	2.2	27.5	0.1	9.5	3.6	1.4
Gelsted	27.9	1.0	5.5	4.1	5.1	0.3	6.7	0.4	1.9	22.9	0.7	18.7	3.1	1.7
Brenderup	30.1	2.3	1.2	6.6	4.2	0.8	5.7	0.3	4.2	30.9	0.3	9.9	2.3	1.0
Fjelsted/Harndrup	26.0	6.6	2.8	4.8	6.8	0.4	7.2	0.1	3.1	26.0	0.7	12.1	1.9	1.6

== Results ==
Party		Votes	%	+/-	Seats	+/-
Middelfart Municipality
A	Social Democrats	7,474	31.77	-8.63	9	-2
V	Venstre	5,564	23.65	-1.24	6	-1
F	Green Left	1,883	8.00	+1.27	2	0
Æ	Denmark Democrats	1,737	7.38	New	2	New
I	Liberal Alliance	1,625	6.91	New	2	New
O	Danish People's Party	1,431	6.08	+1.23	2	+1
Ø	Red-Green Alliance	795	3.38	-1.04	1	0
C	Conservatives	705	3.00	-4.28	0	-2
B	Social Liberals	658	2.80	-0.24	0	0
Å	The Alternative	585	2.49	New	1	New
T	Tværpolitisk Anstændighed	573	2.44	-0.87	0	0
M	Moderates	212	0.90	New	0	New
Y	Solidarisk ansvar	192	0.82	New	0	New
Q	Omsorgsgruppen	91	0.39	-0.23	0	0
Total		23,525	100	N/A	25	N/A
Invalid votes		75	0.23	-0.01		
Blank votes		334	1.03	+0.11		
Turnout		23,934	73.70	+2.85		
Source: valg.dk

== Opinion polls ==
Polling firm	Fieldwork date	Sample size	A	V	C	F	O	Ø	T	B	Q	I	M	Y	Å	Æ	Others	Lead
Epinion	4 Sep - 13 Oct 2025	488	36.3	17.4	5.5	7.6	7.0	3.7	–	1.8	–	7.0	1.5	–	2.7	8.7	0.7	18.9
2024 european parliament election	9 Jun 2024		19.4	16.8	7.8	15.5	6.8	3.6	–	5.9	–	6.9	6.6	–	1.9	8.9	–	2.6
2022 general election	1 Nov 2022		31.5	12.8	5.0	7.4	2.7	2.7	–	2.7	–	7.4	10.6	–	1.9	10.3	–	18.7
2021 regional election	16 Nov 2021		27.5	36.8	7.9	7.1	5.0	4.2	–	4.2	–	1.0	–	–	0.3	–	–	9.3
2021 municipal election	16 Nov 2021		40.4 (11)	24.9 (7)	7.3 (2)	6.7 (2)	4.9 (1)	4.4 (1)	3.3 (0)	3.0 (0)	0.6 (0)	–	–	–	–	–	–	15.5
