= 2021 Middelfart municipal election =

| ← 2017 | 16 November 2021 | 2025 → |

All 25 seats to the Middelfart Municipal Council 13 seats needed for a majority
- Turnout: 22,330 (70.9%) ▼5.9pp
| | First party | Second party | Third party |
|---|---|---|---|
| | A | V | C |
| Party | Social Democrats | Venstre | Conservatives |
| Last election | 14 seats, 48.6% | 6 seats, 22.5% | 1 seat, 3.6% |
| Seats won | 11 | 7 | 2 |
| Seat change | ▼3 | ▲1 | ▲1 |
| Popular vote | 8,867 | 5,463 | 1,597 |
| Percentage | 40.4% | 24.9% | 7.3% |
| Swing | ▼8.2% | ▲2.4% | ▲3.7% |
| | Fourth party | Fifth party | Sixth party |
| | F | O | Ø |
| Party | Green Left | Danish People's Party | Red–Green Alliance |
| Last election | 1 seat, 5.7% | 2 seats, 9.7% | 1 seat, 3.1% |
| Seats won | 2 | 1 | 1 |
| Seat change | ▲1 | ▼1 | 0 |
| Popular vote | 1,478 | 1,066 | 969 |
| Percentage | 6.7% | 4.9% | 4.4% |
| Swing | ▲1.0% | ▼4.8% | ▲1.3% |
| | Seventh party |
| | D |
| Party | New Right |
| Last election | Did Not Stand |
| Seats won | 1 |
| Seat change | ▲1 |
| Popular vote | 894 |
| Percentage | 4.1% |
| Swing | New |
Mayor before election
Johannes Lundsfryd Jensen
Social Democrats
Mayor after election
Johannes Lundsfryd Jensen
Social Democrats

Since the 2007 municipal reform, only the Social Democrats had held the mayor's position in Middelfart Municipality.

In 2017, Steen Dahlstrøm from the Social Democrats, who had been mayor for over 30 years, announced his immediate resignation, and Johannes Lundsfryd Jensen would take over. He would win 14 seats in the 2017 Middelfart municipal election, one more than required for an absolute majority.

For this election however, the Social Democrats would lose 3 seats. Venstre would win 7 seats, the most ever in the four elections after the municipal reform. However parties of the traditional red bloc won 14 seats, and Johannes Lundsfryd Jensen was in pole position to win a second term. It was later confirmed that he would continue as mayor.

== Electoral system ==
For elections to Danish municipalities, a number varying from 9 to 31 are chosen to be elected to the municipal council. The seats are then allocated using the D'Hondt method and a closed list proportional representation. Middelfart Municipality had 25 seats in 2021

Unlike in Danish General Elections, in elections to municipal councils, electoral alliances are allowed.

== Electoral alliances ==
=== Electoral Alliance 1 ===
| Party | | Political alignment |
|---|---|---|
| A | Social Democrats | Centre-left |
| B | Social Liberals | Centre to Centre-left |

=== Electoral Alliance 2 ===
| Party | | Political alignment |
|---|---|---|
| C | Conservatives | Centre-right |
| O | Danish People's Party | Right-wing to Far-right |

=== Electoral Alliance 3 ===
| Party | | Political alignment |
|---|---|---|
| F | Green Left | Centre-left to Left-wing |
| Ø | Red–Green Alliance | Left-wing to Far-Left |

=== Electoral Alliance 4 ===
| Party | | Political alignment |
|---|---|---|
| D | New Right | Right-wing to Far-right |
| V | Venstre | Centre-right |

== Results by polling station ==
H = Omsorgsgruppen
P = PositivPlus
T = Tværpolitisk Anstændighed

| Division | A | B | C | D | F | H | O | P | T | V | Æ | Ø |
| Division | % | % | % | % | % | % | % | % | % | % | % | % |
|---|---|---|---|---|---|---|---|---|---|---|---|---|
| Middelfart V | 40.8 | 3.0 | 7.6 | 3.4 | 9.4 | 1.2 | 3.5 | 0.0 | 3.2 | 22.1 | 0.1 | 5.7 |
| Middelfart Ø | 46.2 | 2.9 | 6.5 | 3.6 | 7.7 | 0.8 | 5.2 | 0.0 | 2.3 | 21.0 | 0.3 | 3.6 |
| Strib | 33.3 | 3.2 | 13.4 | 3.1 | 7.0 | 0.3 | 3.8 | 0.0 | 2.7 | 27.5 | 0.1 | 5.5 |
| Hyllehøj | 40.6 | 2.5 | 6.4 | 5.9 | 5.8 | 0.7 | 5.4 | 0.1 | 3.2 | 25.1 | 0.4 | 4.0 |
| Ejby | 39.8 | 1.9 | 6.5 | 4.1 | 4.5 | 0.6 | 5.4 | 0.3 | 2.8 | 30.2 | 0.1 | 3.9 |
| Baaring | 34.1 | 3.7 | 3.9 | 5.3 | 5.0 | 0.3 | 5.0 | 0.3 | 7.6 | 29.3 | 0.2 | 5.4 |
| Nørre Aaby | 40.9 | 2.7 | 5.6 | 3.0 | 6.3 | 0.4 | 5.6 | 0.2 | 6.5 | 23.9 | 0.5 | 4.2 |
| Aulby | 31.6 | 3.6 | 6.7 | 4.6 | 5.8 | 0.9 | 4.5 | 0.0 | 3.8 | 32.7 | 0.3 | 5.4 |
| Gelsted | 37.2 | 1.7 | 6.8 | 6.4 | 6.8 | 0.3 | 4.7 | 0.2 | 1.9 | 30.8 | 0.2 | 3.2 |
| Brenderup | 49.1 | 3.2 | 5.4 | 3.7 | 4.1 | 0.1 | 5.6 | 0.9 | 1.9 | 22.6 | 0.3 | 3.1 |
| Fjelsted/Harndrup | 42.1 | 7.9 | 6.1 | 5.8 | 3.0 | 0.5 | 8.9 | 0.6 | 2.8 | 19.6 | 0.3 | 2.4 |

== Results ==
| Party | | Votes | % | +/- | Seats | +/- |
Middelfart Municipality
| A | Social Democrats | 8,867 | 40.40 | -8.15 | 11 | -3 |
| V | Venstre | 5,463 | 24.89 | +2.37 | 7 | +1 |
| C | Conservatives | 1,597 | 7.28 | +3.71 | 2 | +1 |
| F | Green Left | 1,478 | 6.73 | +1.08 | 2 | +1 |
| O | Danish People's Party | 1,066 | 4.86 | -4.84 | 1 | -1 |
| Ø | Red-Green Alliance | 969 | 4.41 | +1.35 | 1 | 0 |
| D | New Right | 894 | 4.07 | New | 1 | New |
| T | Tværpolitisk Anstændighed | 726 | 3.31 | New | 0 | New |
| B | Social Liberals | 666 | 3.03 | -0.16 | 0 | 0 |
| H | Omsorgsgruppen | 136 | 0.62 | New | 0 | New |
| Æ | Freedom List | 52 | 0.24 | New | 0 | New |
| P | PositivPlus | 34 | 0.15 | -0.16 | 0 | 0 |
| Total | | 21,948 | 100 | N/A | 25 | N/A |
| Invalid votes | | 75 | 0.24 | +0.07 | | |
| Blank votes | | 307 | 0.97 | +0.16 | | |
| Turnout | | 22,330 | 70.85 | -5.92 | | |
Source: valg.dk
