= Esther Vagning =

Danish pianist (1905–1986)

Esther Nielsen Vagning
- Born: 28 June 1905; Strib-Røjleskov, Funen, Denmark
- Died: 31 December 1986 (aged 81) Copenhagen, Denmark
- Genres: Classical music
- Occupations: Pianist, teacher
- Instrument: Piano
- Years active: 1928–1986

Esther Nielsen Vagning (28 Jun 1905 – 31 December 1986) was a Danish pianist who made an impressive début in the Tivoli Concert Hall in 1928, playing Beethoven's Third Piano Concerto. Over more than 50 years, she performed widely in Denmark and abroad, both as a soloist and accompanist. She also taught at the Royal Danish Academy of Music.

== Biography ==
Born on 28 June 1905 in Strib-Røjleskov in the north west of Funen, Esther Vagning was the daughter of the carpenter Ebbe Nielsen (1860–1953) and Mette Nielsen (1862–1942). In her early childhood, the family including seven children moved to nearby Middelfart. Vagning started to play the piano when she was three, taking lessons from Mary Tauber, a competent teacher in Nørre Åby. In her early teens, she started to accompany silent films in the local cinema. She went on to play with several competent Funen musicians, including the violinists Peder Møller, Leo Hansen and Niels Simon Christiansen, and the opera singer Else Schøtt. When she was 17, she received private lessons from Agnes Adler in Copenhagen. She completed her studies in Paris, France, with the Spaniard Santiago Riera and in Berlin, Germany, under Edwin Fischer.

Vagning made her début playing Beethoven's Piano Concerto No. 3 at the so-called "Young Evening" in the Tivoli Concert Hall in 1928, after rehearsing for only 20 minutes with the orchestra. She became increasingly popular, performing in 1,289 concerts over the next 25 years, of which 49 were abroad, not just in Scandinavia but also in England, France, Belgium, the Netherlands and Switzerland.

She also played as a soloist and accompanist on the radio, including from 1936 to 1944 for the radio choir. She frequently performed in a trio with the violinist Henry Holst and the cellist Erling Bløndal Bengtsson. From 1940, Vagning often played in the Kammermusikforeningen (Chamber Music Society), becoming an honorary member at their 90th anniversary in 1958.

From 1960 to 1975, she taught at the Royal Danish Academy of Music, where she trained many notable pianists, including Jutta Rohard, Merete Westergaard, Elisabeth Westenholz and Dorthe Kirkeskov. Vagning continued to perform at concerts, performing at the 50th-anniversary concert in 1979. Even after moving to an old people's home, she continued to play for the residents.

Esther Vagning died on 31 December 1986 in Copenhagen.
