= Ejby =

Ejby is the name of several small towns and a former municipality in Denmark:

- Ejby Municipality, now included in Middelfart Municipality
- Ejby, Middelfart Municipality
- Ejby, Glostrup Municipality, a suburb in Glostrup Municipality near Copenhagen
- Ejby, Køge Municipality
- Ejby, Lejre Municipality
