= Bertel Møhl =

Danish marine zoologist and physiologist

- Born: 2 January 1936; Copenhagen, Denmark
- Died: 13 September 2017 (aged 81); Hundested, Denmark
- Resting place: Ramløse
- Education: University of Copenhagen
- Children: Three sons
- Scientific career
- Fields: Bioacoustics; Sensory physiology; Marine mammalogy
- Workplaces: University of Copenhagen; University of Guelph; Aarhus University
- Thesis: (1965)
- Doctoral advisor: Torkel Weis-Fogh

Bertel Møhl (2 January 1936 – 13 September 2017) was a Danish marine zoologist and physiologist. He contributed significantly to the understanding of auditory physiology and bioacoustics of bats and marine mammals.

Bertel Møhl was born in Copenhagen in 1936, as oldest son of paleozoologist and taxidermist Ulrik Møhl and potter Felix Møhl (born Elka Lütken Petersen). He studied zoology at University of Copenhagen and graduated in 1965 (Mag.Scient.), worked first at the NATO funded Porpoise Research station in Strib, Denmark, then as postdoctoral fellow with professor Keith Ronald at University of Guelph and finally as associate professor in sensory physiology at Aarhus University, where he remained until his retirement in 2007.

His early work dealt with anatomy and physiology of hearing in true seals, which included the first description of the soft tissue anatomy of the pinniped middle ear, the first audiogram of a pinniped and studies of the electrophysiology of the seal cochlea.

Together with Ken Norris he published a seminal paper in 1983 on the so-called acoustic big-bang theory, in which it was proposed that toothed whales might be able to generate sounds loud enough to incapacitate or even kill their prey. Although the theory is no longer consistent with experimental data, the paper itself served as a significant inspiration for studies in odontocete bioacoustics and in the experimental approach to testing the hypothesis a number of significant findings were made, including the loudest sound pressures ever measured from any animal (from sperm whales); the first odontocete feeding sounds recorded in the wild (narwhals); first experimental evidence for the sound transmission pathway in the sperm whale nose; and the hyperdirectionality of the sperm whale echolocation sound beam.

In the 1970s and 1980s Bertel Møhl concurrently studied biosonar in bats. He was particularly interested in the nature of the detection process and through a series of experiments provided substantial evidence against the at the time dominant theory of coherent signal processing by the bat auditory system.

== Sources ==
- Madsen, P. T., K. Beedholm, J. Tougaard, and M. Wahlberg. 2018. Bertel Møhl 1936–2017. Marine Mammal Science 34:556–562.
- Wahlberg, M., and W. W. L. Au. 2018. Obituary Bertel Møhl 1936–2017. Acoustics Today 14(1):75.
- Bertel Møhl genealogy on www.gruthansen.org
