= Listed buildings in Middelfart Municipality =

This is a list of listed buildings in Middelfart Municipality, Denmark.

Note: This list is incomplete. A complete list of listed buildings in Middelfart Municipality can be found on Danish Wikipedia.

== The list ==
Listing name	Image	Location	Coordinates	Description
Algade 60: Holms Hotel		Algade 60A, 5500 Middelfart	55°30′17.74″N 9°44′0.86″E	Half-timbered house from c. 1600
Henner Friiser House		Brogade 8, 5500 Middelfart	55°30′24.25″N 9°43′37.55″E	Half-timbered house from c. 1575-1600
Nørre Åby Station		Jernbanevej 4, 5580 Nørre Aaby	55°27′36.62″N 9°52′12.33″E	Railway station from 1909 by Heinrich Wenck, consisting of the main building, a warehouse, a toilet building, the wall that connects the three buildings and a timber structure facing the platform
Wedellsborg		Tybrindvej 2, 5592 Ejby	55°22′3.28″N 9°49′12.1″E	Main building from c. 1500 and the late 16th century which was significantly altered in 1706 and 1920
