= Anton Frederik Bruun =

Danish oceanographer and ichthyologist

- Born: 14 December 1901; Jelling, Denmark
- Died: 13 December 1961 (aged 59); Copenhagen, Denmark
- Resting place: Mariebjerg Cemetery, Copenhagen (unmarked grave)
- Education: University of Copenhagen
- Scientific career
- Fields: Oceanography, Ichthyology
- Workplaces: University of Copenhagen

Anton Frederik Bruun (14 December 1901 – 13 December 1961) was a Danish oceanographer and ichthyologist.

Educated at University of Copenhagen (1926) and employed at the Danish Commission for Marine Research (Kommissionen for Danmarks Fiskeri- og Havundersøgelser), where he participated in the third Dana expedition (1928–1930). From 1938 employed at the Zoological Museum of Copenhagen University. In 1945–46 scientific leader of the Atlantide expedition along the coast of West Africa and in 1950–1952 scientific leader of the Galathea deep-sea expedition, which circumnavigated the world.

He became the first president of the Intergovernmental Oceanographic Commission, under UNESCO and was a leading figure in establishing international organisations for the exploration of the seas.

The R/V Anton Bruun (former US presidential yacht USS Williamsburg) was named after him, as was the underwater bioacoustic research facility "Station Oceanographique Anton Bruun", in Strib, Denmark (1962–1983).

The Anton Bruun Medal is awarded every second year by the Intergovernmental Oceanographic Commission at its biannual Assembly.

== Sources ==
- Bruun Condendium
- Online biography
