= Nørre Åby Efterskole =

School in Nørre Åby, Middelfart on Funen, Denmark

Coordinates: 55°27′17.49″N 9°53′20.5″E

Nørre Åby Efterskole is an efterskole located in Nørre Åby, Middelfart on Funen, Denmark.

The efterskole specializes in drama, music, animation, fitness, dance and soccer. It was founded by Olaf Nielsen, when Theodor Jensen left the school in 1886 and the schools attendance rose from 10 to 100 students. The dorms on the school mainly consist of two persons chambers. There is however a few three and four people dorms. Nørre Åby is the town most close to the efterskole.
