= USS Williamsburg =

US Navy gunboat and presidential yacht

Coordinates: 44°05′06″N 9°52′47″E

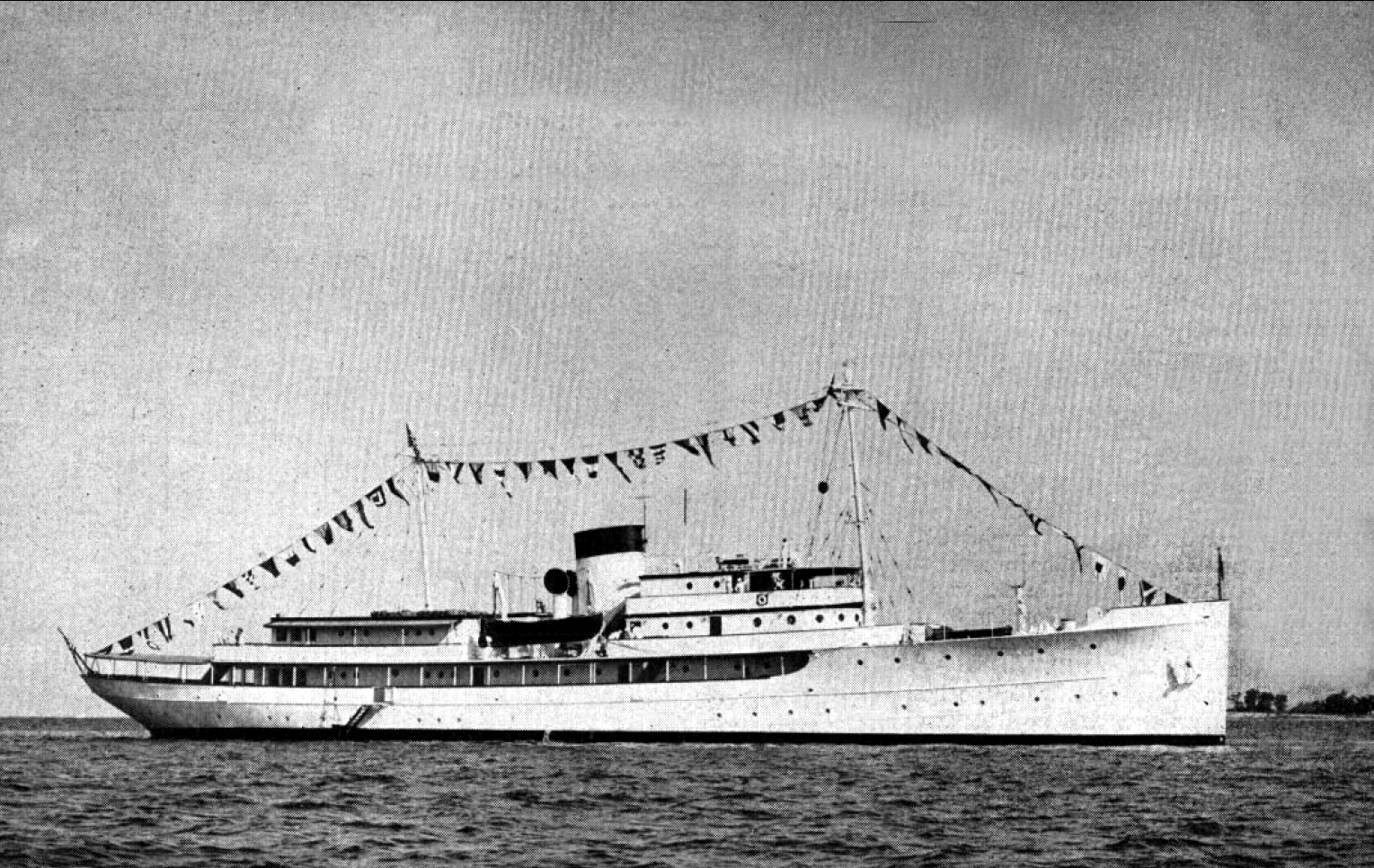
- USS Williamsburg in 1950

History

United States
- Name: Aras
- Owner: Hugh J. Chisholm, Jr.
- Builder: Bath Iron Works
- Laid down: 19 March 1930
- Launched: 8 December 1930
- Acquired: 15 January 1931
- Fate: Acquired by the US Navy, 24 April 1941

United States
- Name: USS Williamsburg
- Namesake: City of Williamsburg, Virginia
- Acquired: 24 April 1941
- Commissioned: 7 October 1941
- Reclassified: Patrol gunboat, 23 June 1941; General communications vessel, 10 November 1945
- Identification: Callsign: NASN; Hull number: PG-56 (23 June 1941) AGC-369 (10 November 1945)
- Decommissioned: 30 June 1953
- Stricken: 1 April 1962
- Fate: Transferred to National Science Foundation, 9 August 1962

General characteristics (in US Navy service)
- Displacement: 1,805 long tons (1,834 t) full load
- Length: 243 ft 9 in (74.30 m)
- Beam: 36 ft (11 m)
- Draft: 14 ft (4.3 m)
- Installed power: 1,100 bhp (820 kW)
- Propulsion: 2 × Winton diesel engines
- Speed: 13.5 kn (25.0 km/h; 15.5 mph)
- Complement: 81
- Armament: 2 × 3 in (76 mm) gun mounts; 6 × .50 in (12.7 mm) caliber Browning machine guns; 2 × .30 in (7.62 mm) caliber Lewis machine guns; 2 × depth charge tracks; 1 × "Y" gun; Small arms; 16 rifles and 10 pistols

United States
- Name: Anton Bruun
- Namesake: Anton Frederik Bruun
- Operator: Woods Hole Oceanographic Institution
- Acquired: 9 August 1962
- Fate: Sold 1971; Scrapped in La Spezia, Italy, in March 2016

USS Williamsburg was a US Navy gunboat. A former private yacht, it also served as a presidential yacht from 1945 to 1953.

== Private yacht ==
The steel-hulled, diesel-powered yacht Aras was laid down on 19 March 1930 by the Bath Iron Works; launched on 8 December 1930, and delivered to wood-pulp magnate Hugh J. Chisholm, Jr., on 15 January 1931, who named it for his wife, the former Sara Hardenbergh.

Aras displaced 1,805 long tons (1,834 t) fully loaded; with a length of 243 ft 9 in (74.30 m); a beam of 36 ft (11 m); and a draft of 14 ft (4.3 m). Her two Winton diesel engines generated 1,100 bhp (820 kW), with a speed of 13.5 kn (25.0 km/h; 15.5 mph).

The US Navy acquired Aras on 24 April 1941 and renamed her Williamsburg. The former pleasure craft entered the Brewer Drydock and Repair Co., of Brooklyn, New York, on 23 June, for conversion into a gunboat.

== US Naval service ==
Williamsburg (PG-56) was commissioned at the New York Navy Yard, on 7 October 1941. Williamsburg was ordered to the Norfolk Navy Yard to complete fitting-out, arriving on 5 November.

As a gunboat, Williamsburg was armed with two 3-inch (76 mm)/50 caliber gun mounts, six .50 in (12.7 mm) caliber Browning machine guns, two .30 in (7.62 mm) caliber Lewis machine guns, two depth charge tracks, one Y-gun depth charge projector, 16 rifles, and 10 pistols. Her crew complement was 81.

After final alterations, the gunboat departed Norfolk on 2 December, touched briefly at Washington, D.C., and eventually arrived at Halifax, Nova Scotia, on 6 December, the day before the Japanese attacked Pearl Harbor.

=== World War II ===
Williamsburg departed Halifax, on 8 December, bound for Iceland; via Hvalfjörður; and reached Reykjavík, later in December 1941. She arrived when the newly established Naval Operating Base (NOB), Iceland, encountered difficulties. Rear Admiral James L. Kauffman, the first commandant of NOB Iceland, had arrived in Reykjavík in the battleship Arkansas shortly after the United States entered the war. He found that no quarters existed ashore for himself or his staff. Moreover, while tentative arrangements had been made to assign a station ship to Reykjavík, the congestion of shipping there and the shortage of space made a permanently pier-moored ship impossible. Therefore, it was necessary to have a ship that could be anchored clear of the docks. The problem was solved when Admiral Kauffman transferred his flag from Arkansas to Williamsburg at Hvalfjörður on 23 December. Since the Army's Port Authority in Iceland was also in need of headquarters at that time, its commanding officer and his staff were also accommodated in Williamsburg.

Rear Admiral Kauffman flew his flag in Williamsburg until the spring of 1942. By then, the ship had been moored alongside the main quay at Reykjavík. She provided Kauffman with a headquarters and served as quarters for the communications personnel and the admiral's staff. When Camp Knox – the naval facility on Iceland – was completed in mid-May, Kauffman hauled down his flag and moved ashore to release Williamsburg for other duties.

The gunboat got underway on 18 May, with a party of Army officers embarked, for an inspection tour of the island of Iceland. Led by Major General Charles H. Bonesteel, the party inspected bases at Akureyri, Dalvík, Búðareyri, and Reyðarfjörður. While making the cruise, the ship escorted the British troop and supply vessel SS Lochnagar to these ports. With the inspection trip completed by the end of May, Williamsburg put to sea to contact the disabled merchantman SS Gemini, reportedly suffering from a damaged propeller and under tow by the British tug Jaunty.

Assisted by a PBY, the gunboat searched for Gemini and Jaunty. Escorted by USCGC Duane (WPG-33) and Babbitt, the tug and merchantman finally hove into sight on 1 June; and Williamsburg fell in as additional escort to Reykjavik. Shifting to Hvalfjörður on 4 June, the gunboat underwent tender repairs alongside Melville into the middle of the month. Returning to Reykjavik, soon thereafter, Williamsburg escorted Pegasus on a coastwise supply mission to Akureyri. While en route, a PBY provided air coverage; the gunboat sank a drifting mine with machine gun fire. She returned to Reykjavík on 20 June.

After transporting a party of Army officers and nurses to Hvalfjörður and back to Reykjavík for an inspection trip and a visit to the battleship Washington, Williamsburg operated on local patrol and convoy escort during July 1942. On 12 July, in the midst of one such mission escorting the liberty ship SS Richard Henry Lee, Williamsburg took on board 28 sealed boxes of gold bullion – valued at approximately $1,500,000 – at Seyðisfjörður, and transported it to Reykjavík, where she turned it over to Washington. Williamsburg was then berthed alongside Melville for tender repairs from 14 to 16 July.

Williamsburg next steamed on Weather Station Patrol "Baker" from 18 to 20 July, and towed two buoys from Reykjavík to Hvalfjörður before returning to her home port on 22 July, remaining there until the end of the month.

Williamsburg again served as a VIP transport the following month, taking a USO troupe to Hvalfjörður, where the entertainers put on two shows on 2 August. Eight days later, the converted yacht got underway for Derry, Northern Ireland, for emergency repairs. Underway on 10 August, she joined the Royal Navy trawlers HMT Paynter, HMT Bredon (T223), and HMS Blackfly (FY 117) in escorting Convoy RU-35 consisting of nine merchantmen. Detached at The Minches on 14 August, Williamsburg proceeded independently through the Irish Sea, and arrived at Derry, later that day. She was then drydocked from mid-August into the second week of September.

Her repairs were completed on 10 September, and the gunboat conducted antisubmarine practices in company with a British submarine on 13 and 14 September before getting underway on 15 September for Iceland. Proceeding again independently, she battled her way through a gale that sprung both depth charge tracks and tumbled three depth charges into the sea as she rolled and pitched violently in the storm's fury. While en route, she received dispatch orders to rendezvous with the merchant vessel Medina and screen her at Höfn, during the cargoman's unloading. The gunboat proceeded ahead without sonar (it had developed a casualty en route) and with both depth charge tracks badly sprung. Having no radar, she experienced difficulty finding her charge before she finally made contact with Medina at Berusford, on 18 September. Both ships started for Reykjanes, soon after that.

Detached from escorting Medina on 19 September, Williamsburg rendezvoused with Uranus and relieved Leary as escort the same day. She convoyed the stores ship to Búðareyri, where Uranus delivered supplies to the Army base there. Underway for Seyðisfjörður, on 22 September, Williamsburg spotted an unidentified four-engined bomber overhead at 08:30 but, due to the mist and rain, could not identify the plane. Word soon came, however, that the plane was indeed an enemy - possibly a Focke-Wulf Fw 200 Condor used for anti-shipping and reconnaissance missions by the Luftwaffe. The plane approached again at 09:45 and once more failed to identify itself. Williamsburg crewed her general quarters stations but lost the plane in the swirling mist and fog. The enemy aircraft never came within the gunboat's range.

At Seyðisfjörður, on 24 September, Williamsburg took on board 15 survivors from the merchantmen SS Wilham Hooper and SS Daniel Morgan, both sunk during the ordeal of Convoy PQ 17 at the hands of German planes and submarines. While en route to Reykjavík, with these mariners, the gunboat sighted two drifters well inside the fjord at Aðalvík and moved closer for a better look. After investigation, Williamsburg continued on her way, having found only two Icelandic fishing trawlers. She arrived in Reykjavík on 29 September.

Shifting to Hvalfjörður on 30 September, Williamsburg underwent repairs alongside Melville from 30 September to 3 October, at last receiving repairs to her damaged depth charge tracks. The gunboat subsequently escorted SS Lochnagar on revictualling missions to Búðareyri, Seyðisfjörður, and Akureyri, before she returned to Reykjavík, later in the month.

Following further coastwise convoy escort runs in November and December, Williamsburg underwent a tender overhaul and availability alongside Vulcan through Christmas of 1942.

Upon completing these alterations and repairs on 3 January 1943, Williamsburg resumed her coastwise convoy escort duties and continued the task through January 1943. After getting underway for New York Harbor, on 7 February, the gunboat touched at St. John's, Newfoundland, en route and was briefly diverted to Argentia, to escort Pontiac. Williamsburg eventually arrived at the Bethlehem Steel docks at Hoboken, New Jersey, on 22 February, to receive an overhaul.

After a month of repairs and alterations, Williamsburg sailed for Norfolk, where, after her arrival on 31 March, she soon became the flagship for Rear Admiral Donald B. Beary, Commander, Fleet Operational Training Command, Atlantic Fleet.

Over the next two years, Williamsburg operated primarily in the Hampton Roads-Chesapeake Bay region, occasionally deploying to Newport, Rhode Island, New York, Florida waters, or Guantanamo Bay, Cuba.

Williamsburg came under the aegis of Commander, Service Force, Atlantic Fleet, on 16 June 1945. On 10 July, she entered the Norfolk Navy Yard for conversion to an amphibious force flagship (AGC). The need for such specialized craft had been realized in the Pacific; with the war with Japan not yet over, Williamsburg was selected for the metamorphosis. The end of the war with Japan – hastened by the atomic bombings of Hiroshima and Nagasaki – resulted in further work being canceled. Instead, Williamsburg's new employment was to be that of presidential yacht, to replace Potomac, the former Coast Guard cutter and a long-time favorite of the late President Roosevelt.

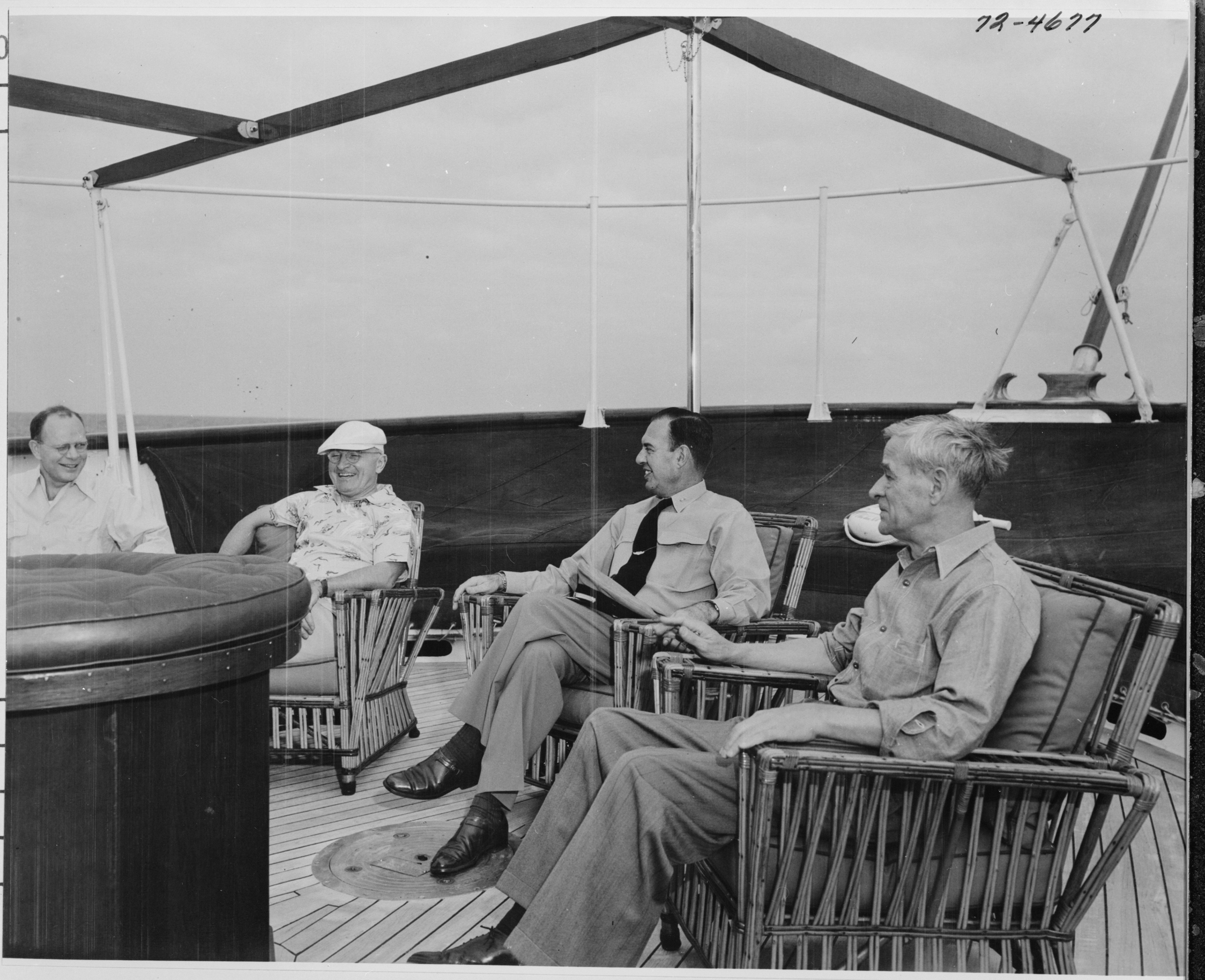
President Truman on the afterdeck of the yacht, USS Williamsburg, during a vacation in Key West, Florida: (left to right) Charles Murphy, Special Counsel to the President; President Truman; Admiral Robert Dennison, Naval Aide to the President; Charles Ross, Press Secretary.

=== Presidential yacht ===
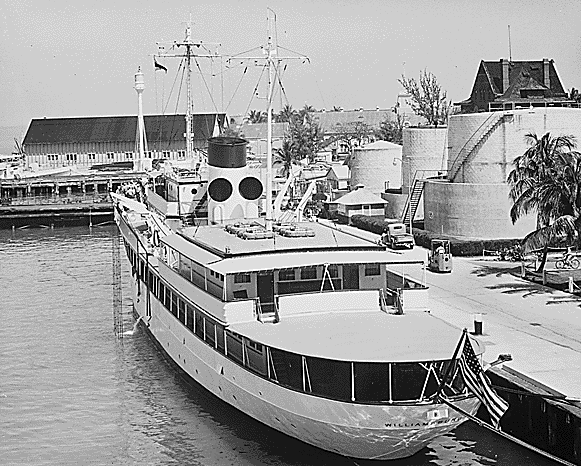
USS Williamsburg, docked at the US Naval Base, Key West, Florida, during President Truman's vacation in 1951

Williamsburg remained at Norfolk into November, undergoing conversion. The ship then sailed for the Washington Navy Yard, where, on 5 November 1945, she relieved Potomac as a presidential yacht and, on 10 November 1945, the erstwhile gunboat was re-designated AGC-369.

In the ensuing years, Williamsburg served two presidents, Harry S. Truman and Dwight D. Eisenhower.

During President Truman's tenure, she embarked such American and foreign notables as Secretary of State George Marshall, President Miguel Alemán of Mexico; and two successive British prime ministers, Winston Churchill and Clement Attlee. During the ship's first tour as a presidential yacht, she cruised the Potomac River and Chesapeake Bay regions, while occasionally venturing into the open sea for cruises to Florida, Bermuda, Cuba, and the Virgin Islands.

President Dwight D. Eisenhower made only one cruise in Williamsburg before ordering her decommissioned. He came on board at Washington, on 14 May 1953, and cruised to Yorktown, Virginia, where he disembarked to visit the ship's namesake, the colonial city of Williamsburg. Re-embarking the Chief Executive at Yorktown later that day, Williamsburg touched at Norfolk, and Annapolis, Maryland, before she returned to the Washington Navy Yard to disembark the President on 18 May.

That proved to be Williamsburg's last cruise as a presidential yacht because President Eisenhower directed that the ship be placed out of commission. Accordingly, she was decommissioned at the Washington Navy Yard on 30 June 1953 and turned over to the Potomac River Naval Command for maintenance and preservation. Subsequently, she shifted to Newport, Rhode Island, and she remained in "special status" from about 2 April 1959. Williamsburg was struck from the Navy list on 1 April 1962.

== National Science Foundation ==
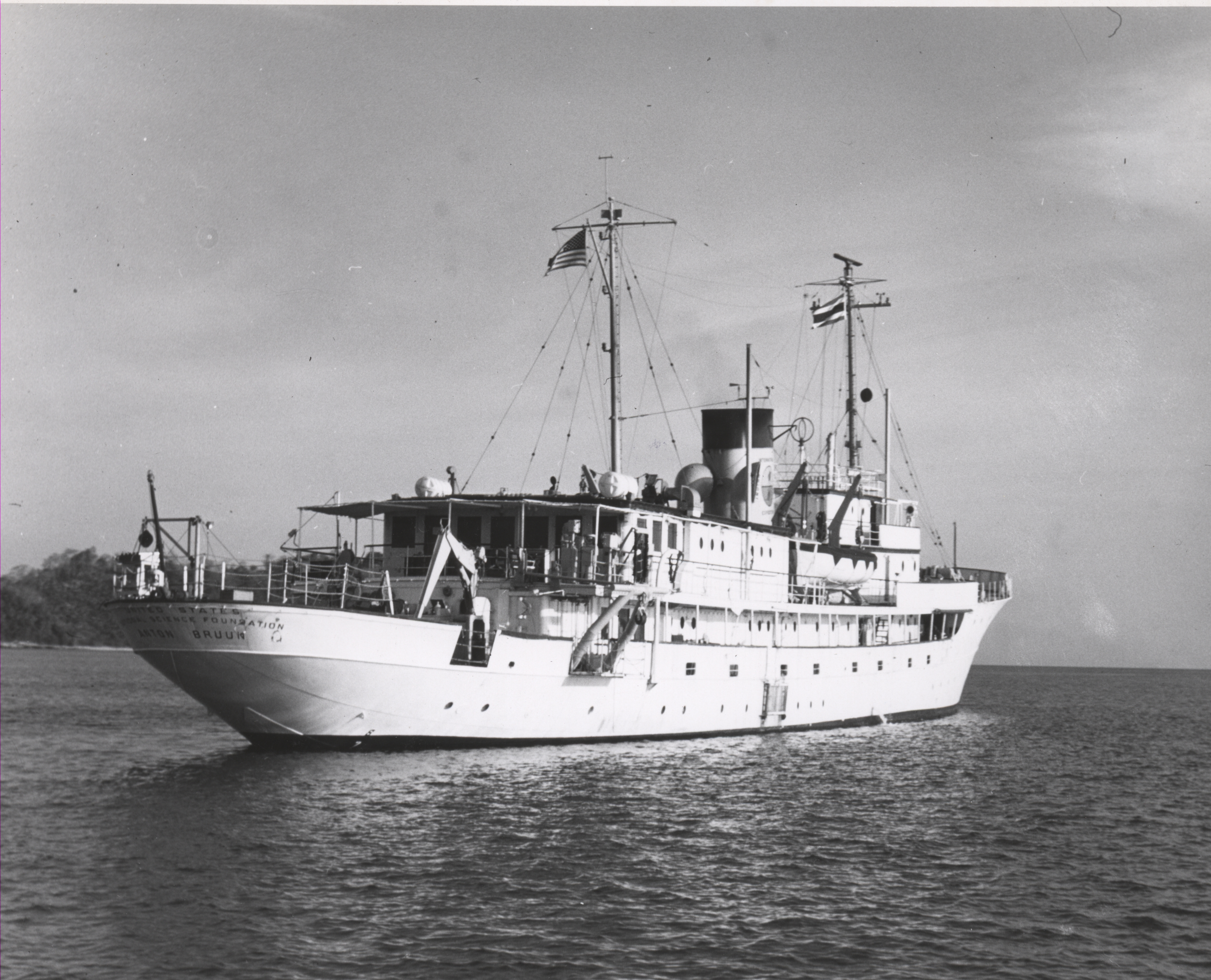
Anton Bruun off the coast of Thailand.

Williamsburg was transferred to the National Science Foundation on 9 August 1962, undergoing a change from a presidential yacht to an oceanographic research vessel at the Woods Hole Oceanographic Institution. During the overhaul, the presidential staterooms and other yacht-like trappings were removed, and special facilities were installed. Among the modifications was a seawater aquarium for preserving live specimens and a lab equipped with microscopes and other instruments for examining and classifying samples of marine life. Two winches and a small crane were fitted for dredging and deep sea work, while a small side deck platform was added to permit long-line fishing. The ship's engines, too, were reconditioned, and her bilge keels were modified to make the ship more stable.

Renamed Anton Bruun, in honor of the noted Danish marine biologist, the ship made ten scientific cruises in the Indian Ocean, conducting broad sample studies of bottom, midwater, and surface life. She caught specimens of plankton; did long-line fishing and trawling in deep water; conducted meteorological observations; and periodically obtained water samples. A multinational assemblage of scientists from the United States, India, Thailand, Brazil, and Pakistan worked on board the ship during this cruise.

Upon the conclusion of the Indian Ocean expedition, Anton Bruun returned to the United States in February 1965. Eight months later, she sailed for the Pacific Ocean to make a series of eight cruises in the Southeastern Pacific Oceanographic Program, conducting biological research in the area of the Humboldt Current and the other regions of the southeastern Pacific. Anton Bruun subsequently continued her oceanographic voyages until 1968.

During that year, while laid up for repairs in a floating drydock, the ship suffered extensive damage when the drydock sank unexpectedly. Anton Bruun was slated to be transferred to the Indian government. Restoration, given the apparent damage suffered in the drydock mishap, appeared uneconomical.

== Subsequent disposition ==
Offered for sale by the Maritime Administration, the former gunboat, presidential yacht, and oceanographic vessel was acquired by a commercial concern whose intention was to use the ship as a combination floating hotel-restaurant-museum to be permanently berthed in Pennsville Township on the Salem River, in New Jersey.

The Williamsburg was towed up the Salem River, where she was placed in a berth originally meant to accommodate a dredge at the former Bright's Marina, renamed the Marlboro Marina. The shallow water depth resulted in the ship firmly grounded in the mud. There the yacht remained in the southern end of Pennsville Township, in Salem County, New Jersey, and for several years after that as a restaurant before being sold to new owners.

In 1993, the former Williamsburg was transferred to Genoa, Italy, for conversion into a luxury cruise ship. These plans were never realized, and the former yacht faced imminent scrapping at La Spezia, Italy, but an urgent appeal to the Italian government saved her. The "USS Williamsburg Preservation Society" was formed to return Williamsburg to the United States for restoration and preservation. Two former White House staffers began a Kickstarter campaign to raise the funds to restore the "Williamsburg" and return her to the U.S. Navy for use by future Presidents; however, the campaign failed to raise the goal of $40 million.

Williamsburg was laid up at the Navy wharf in La Spezia, Italy while offered for sale by Camper & Nicholsons International of Monaco.

The ship sank at her moorings, in La Spezia harbor, in 2015.

On 19 January 2016, the Port Authority of La Spezia authorised the operation for the removal of the ship. Her wreck was scrapped in situ in March.

Williamsburg at La Spezia, Italy, 2008
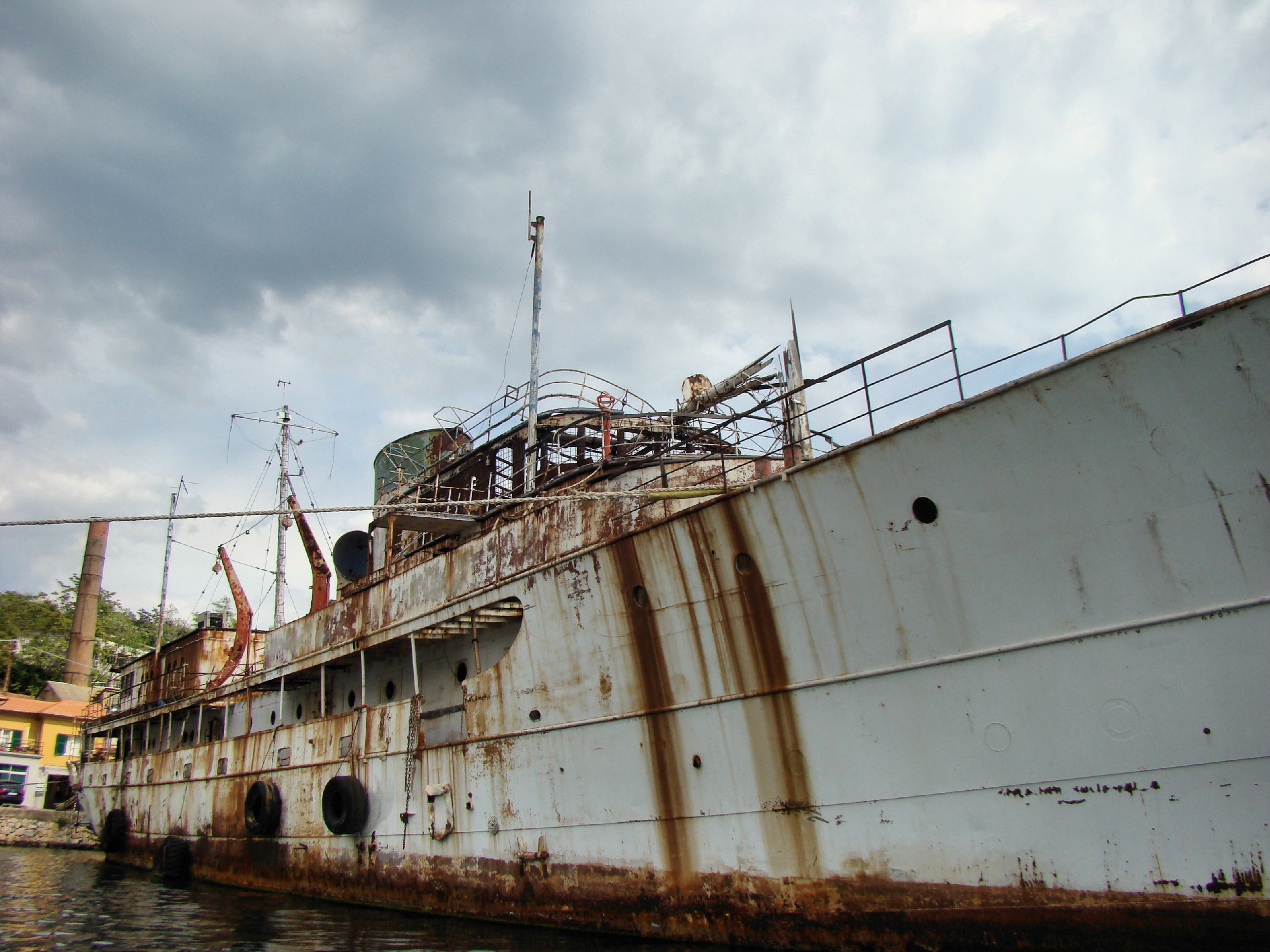

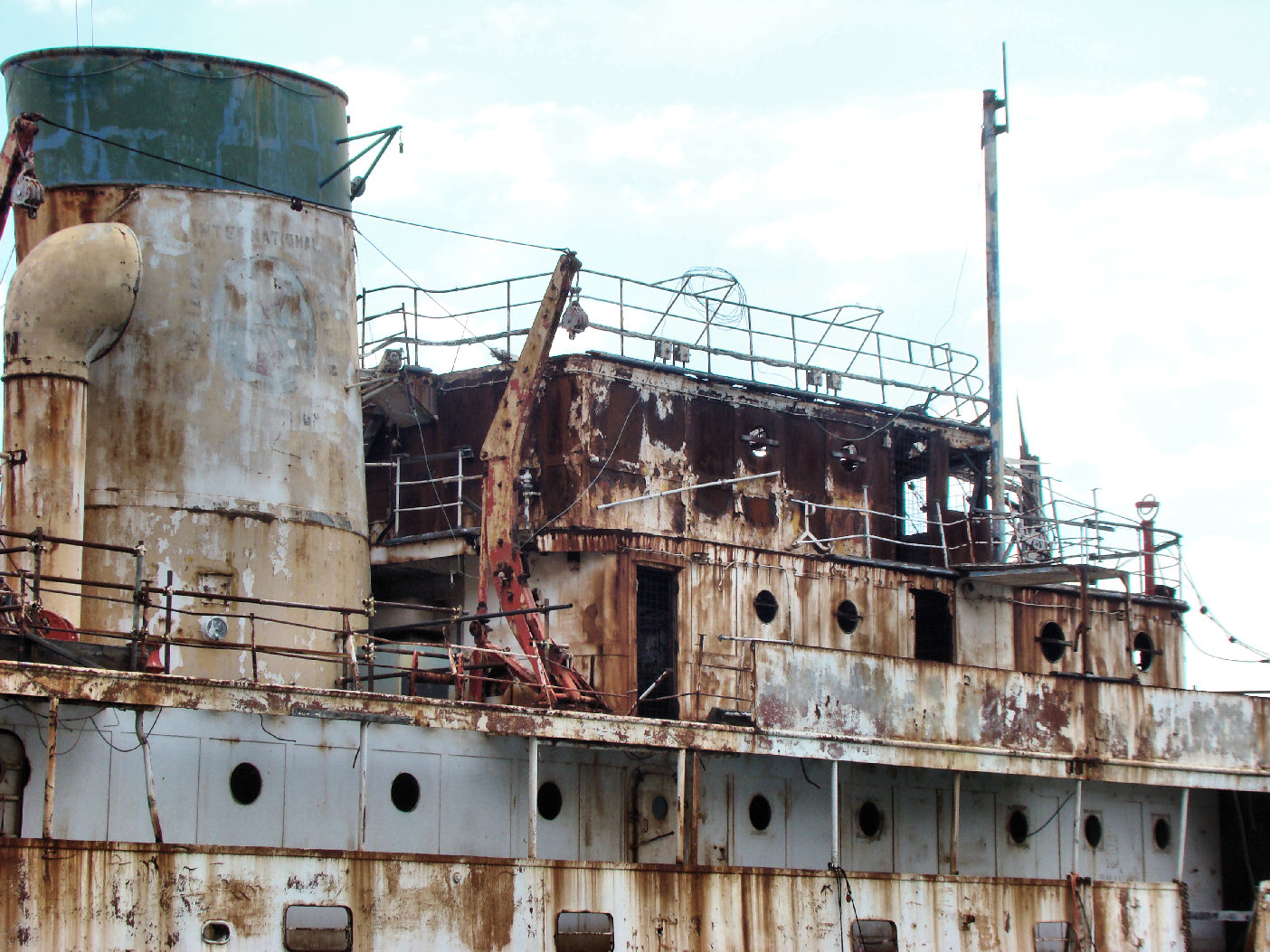

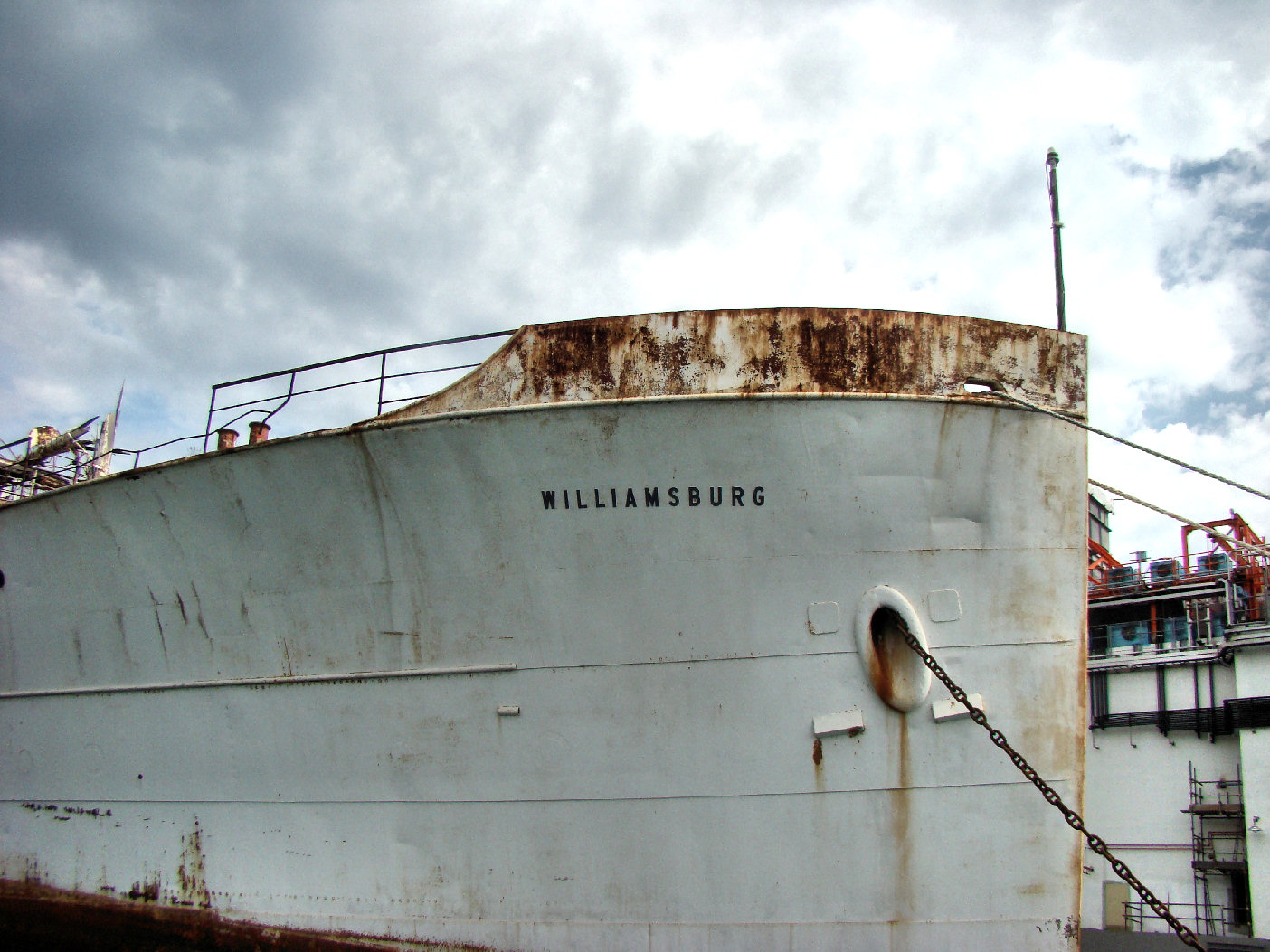

== Awards ==
- American Defense Service Medal
- American Campaign Medal
- European-African-Middle Eastern Campaign Medal
- World War II Victory Medal
- National Defense Service Medal

== Bibliography ==
- Wright, Christopher C. & Harris, Allen C. (1998). "Warship Preservation News". Warship International. XXXV (4): 382–383. ISSN 0043-0374.
