= Strib porpoise research station =

Bioacoustic research facility in Strib, Denmark

Strib porpoise research station was a bioacoustic research facility located in Strib, a small town on the coast of Little Belt, Denmark. The station was formed in 1962 with the official name Station Oceanographique Anton Bruun by the first director René-Guy Busnel (France) and co-worker Willem Dudok van Heel (the Netherlands), in honour of the Danish oceanographer Anton Bruun. Søren Hechmann Andersen joined the station from the start and quickly succeeded Busnel as head of the laboratory. Later he was joined by fellow scientists Bertel Møhl and Mats Amundin. The facilities consisted of net pens in the former ferry harbour and indoor tanks and laboratories. The main focus of research at the station was the bioacoustics of harbour porpoises and involved the first documentation of echolocation in porpoises, first measurements of their hearing, and first recording of their echolocation signals. but also included studies hearing in harbour seals. The station was closed in 1974 and animals and research moved to University of Southern Denmark, where it continued until 1983.
