= Kauslunde =

- Town
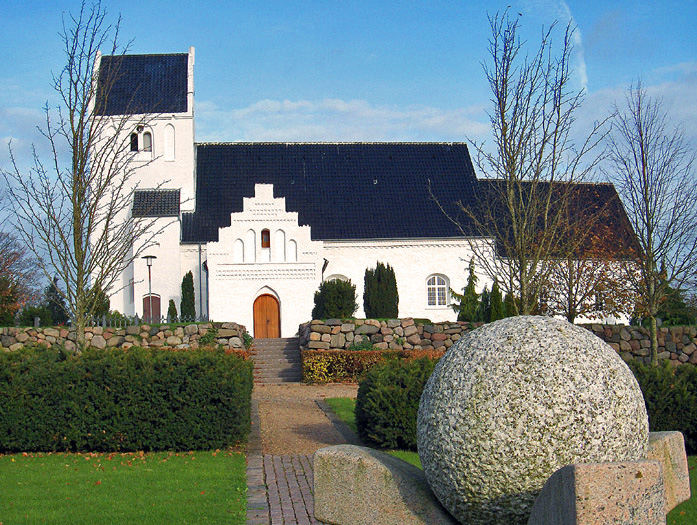
- Kauslunde Church

- Location in the Region of Southern Denmark
- Coordinates: 55°28′51″N 9°48′34″E
- Country: Denmark
- Region: Southern Denmark
- Municipality: Middelfart

Population (2026)
  - Total: 482
- Time zone: UTC+1 (CET)
  - Summer (DST): UTC+2 (CEST)
- Postal code: 5500 Middelfart

Kauslunde is a small railway town located on the island of Funen in south Denmark, in Middelfart Municipality.
