= Søren Absalon Larsen =

Danish physicist

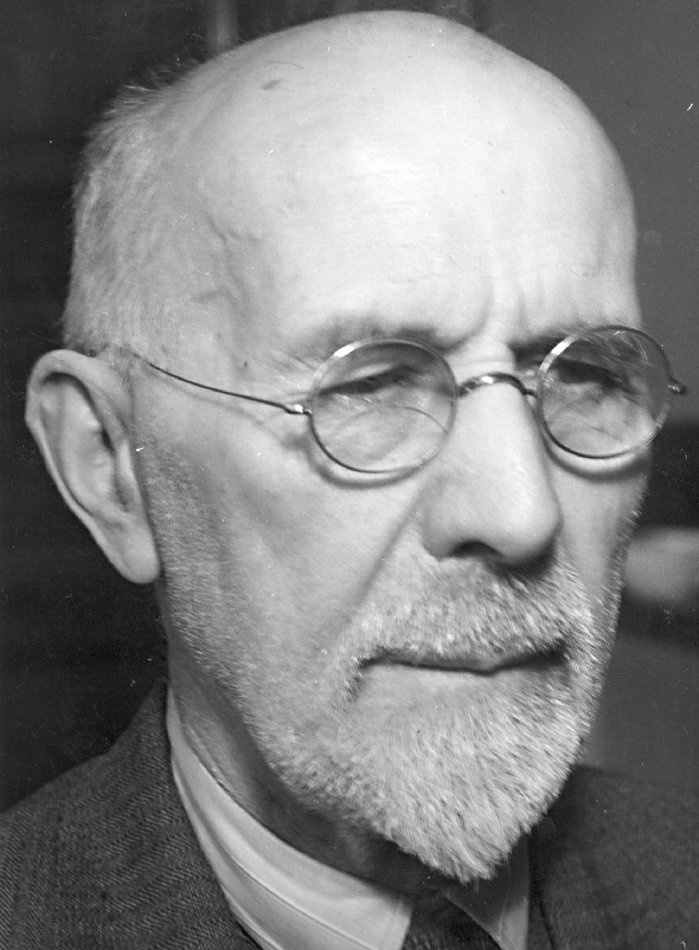
- Søren Absalon Larsen
- Born: 5 April 1871; Nørre Aaby, Denmark
- Died: 2 January 1957 (aged 85); Gentofte, Denmark
- Known for: Larsen effect
- Scientific career
- Fields: Physics, Acoustics
- Institutions: Technical University of Denmark

Søren Absalon Larsen (April 5, 1871 – January 2, 1957) was a Danish physicist who worked in the field of electroacoustics and is best known for giving his name to the Larsen effect.

Absalon Larsen was originally MSc. Philosophy and taught theology, then he began to study physics. He subsequently joined to assist Professor Peter Kristian Prytz in the organization of a new exercise course in electronics for mechanical engineers. He was employed at the Polytechnic college, first as a lecturer, later as a professor of electrical engineering. From 1937 he was chairman of the electrical engineering group under the Danish Academy of Technical Sciences.

More biographical detail exists in the Dansk Biografisk Leksikon and the Nordisk Familjebok, in Danish.

== Family ==
Larsen was the son of farmer and carpenter, later maltster Hans Christian Larsen (1834-1920) and Ingeborg Absalonsen (1833–92).

In 1900, he married Agnes Hedevig Elisabeth Munch (born 11 June 1874 in Haslemere - died 20 September 1953 in Gentofte).

== Education ==
- 1896 - 1897: Assistant Professor K. Prytz (Peter Kristian Prytz, 1851-1929)
- 1898: Copenhagen University gold medal for thesis on Electrical Conductivities of Amalgamates
- 1898 - 1903: Assistant at Polytechnic College Physical Laboratory
- 1903 - 1906: Associate Professor of electrical engineering at the Polytechnic College
- 1906 - 1941: Professor of Electrical Engineering at the Technical University
- 1951: Honorary Doctorate, Technical University of Denmark

== Publications ==
- AC 1 + 2" 1923 (book)
- Messungen von vagabondierenden Stromen in Gas-und Wasserrohren" 1901 (journal article) ~ Measurement of Stray Electrical Current Effects in Gas and Water Pipes.
- A. Larsen, “Ein akustischer Wechselstromerzeuger mit regulierbarer Periodenzahl für schwache Ströme,” Elektrotech. Z., ETZ 32, pp. 284–285, Mar. 1911.
- WorldCat Entries
  - Sagen mod praesten i Vejlby og de sager, der fulgte by Absalon Larsen (Book)
  - Telegrafonen og den Traadløse og Opfinderparret Valdemar Poulsen og P. O. Pedersen by Absalon Larsen (Book)
  - Naturfredning i Frederiksborg amt by Absalon Larsen (Book)
  - Methodical classification of international definitions : A paper read before the special committee on nomenclature, a their meeting in Cologne, March 1913 by Absalon Larsen (Book)
  - Om Radioforstyrrelser og Midler derimod (Book)
  - The Discovery of electromagnetism made in the year 1820 by H. C. Oersted by Absalon Larsen (Book)
