= BornHack =

Annual hacker camp in Funen, Denmark

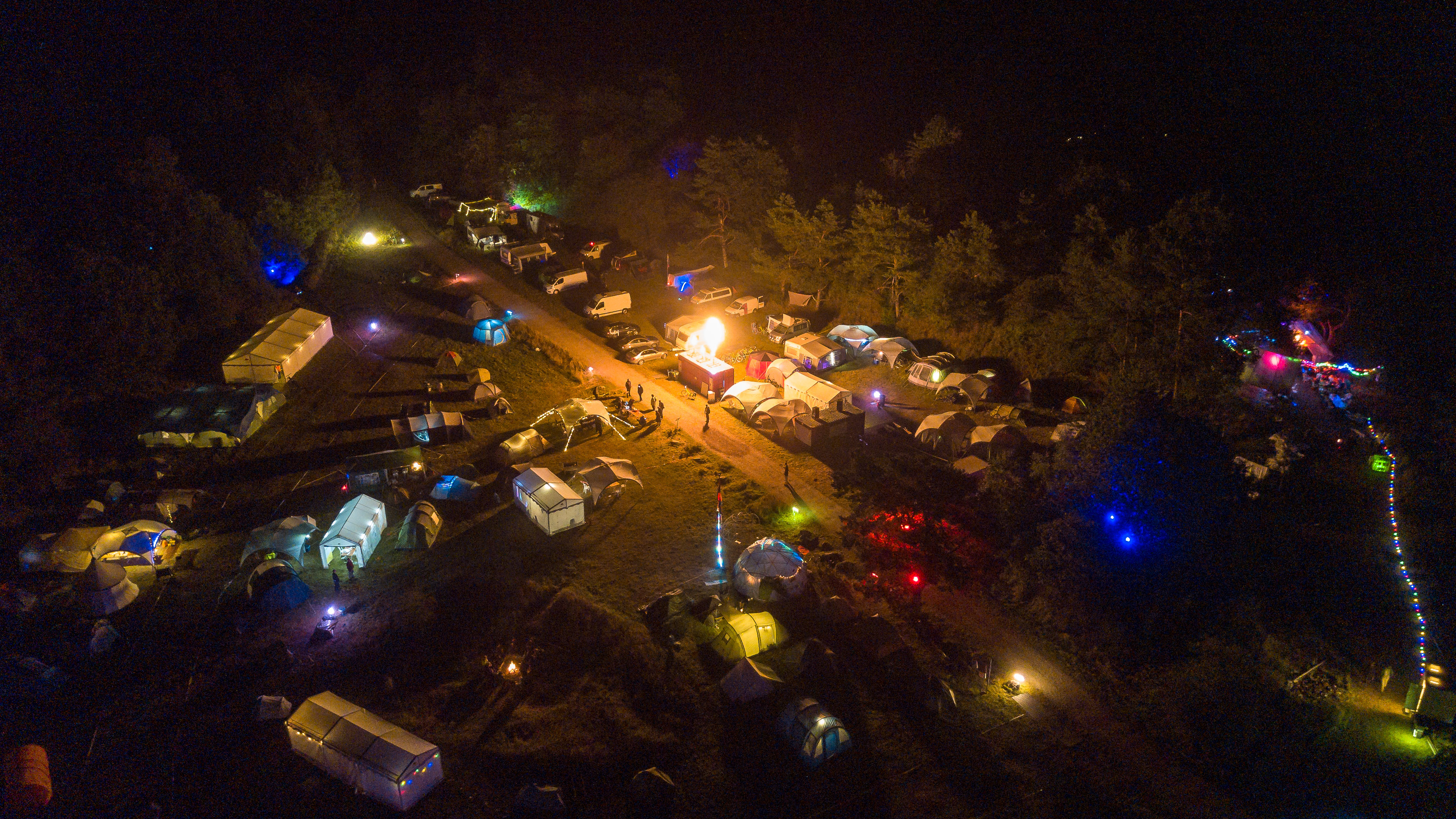
- Drone photo of BornHack 2021 at night
- Genre: Hacker con
- Frequency: Annually
- Locations: Hylkedam, Funen, Denmark (2019-present); Jarlsgård, Bornholm, Denmark (2016-2018)
- Coordinates: 55°23′8.16″N 9°56′20.67″E
- Years active: 9–10
- Inaugurated: 2016
- Previous event: July 16–23, 2025
- Next event: July 15–22, 2026
- Attendance: 222 full week tickets sold in 2022
- Website: bornhack.dk

BornHack (a portmanteau of "Bornholm" and "hack") is an annual hacker camp on the Danish island of Funen, near Gelsted. From 2016 to 2018, it was organized on Bornholm.

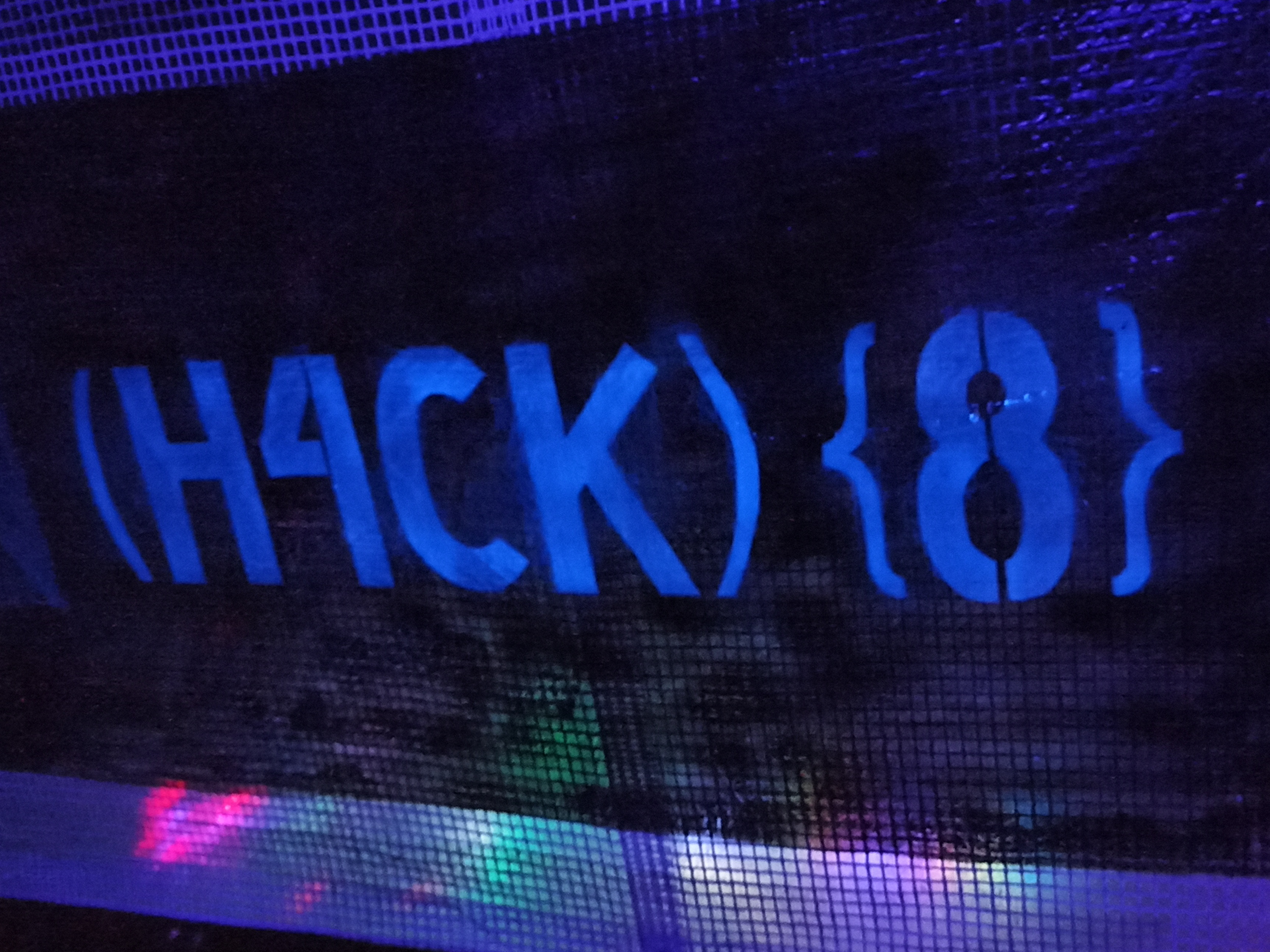
Token created in UV painting and represented as regex at BornHack 2021 for the annual token hunt

== History ==
In 2021, the BornHack electronic badge was based on a perfboard due to the chip shortage. The 2021 camp was also captured in Google Maps' aerial pictures.

In 2022, Thomas Flummer developed a badge based on the RP2040, for which software can be developed in CircuitPython.

During BornHack there is a field specifically designed for loud noise, with a noise barrier made from soil. A Dutch hacker brought an old civil defense siren for testing purposes. Within a few minutes, four separate phone calls were made to the Danish police from houses located a large distance from BornHack.

List of camps
Year	Date	Tagline	Location	Attendance	Badge theme & technology
2025	July 16-23	10 Badges	Hylkedam, Funen, Denmark	TBD	
2024	July 17–24	Feature Creep	Hylkedam, Funen, Denmark	350 full week	
2023	August 2–9	make legacy	Hylkedam, Funen, Denmark	-	NFC Badges; RP2040, NXP PN7150 & 16 MiB SPI flash (CircuitPython support)
2022	August 3–10	black ~/hack	Hylkedam, Funen, Denmark	222 full week tickets, 53 one day tickets	Game On Badge; RP2040, color LCD screen on ST7735S & 16 MiB SPI flash (CircuitPython support)
2021	August 19–26	Continuous Delivery	Hylkedam, Funen, Denmark	250 full week tickets, 70 one day tickets	DIY Badge; free-hand veroboard
2020	August 11–18	make clean	Hylkedam, Funen, Denmark	150 full week tickets	Pixel Scroller; SAMD21, 9x32 LED matrix on IS31FL3731, IR LEDs (CircuitPython support)
2019	August 8–15	A new /home	Hylkedam, Funen, Denmark	-	Star Wars Light Sabre; EFM32HG322, 240x240 pixel IPS LCD on ST7789, IR LEDs, MicroSD card socket
2018	August 16–23	scale it	Jarlsgård, Bornholm, Denmark	-	Bluetooth Radio; EFM32HG322 & nRF51822 BT radio, selection of breakout boards
2017	August 22–29	Make Tradition	Jarlsgård, Bornholm, Denmark	-	Major Bornholm; EFM32HG322 & 128x64 pixel OLED display on SSD1306
2016	August 27 - September 3	Initial Commit	Jarlsgård, Bornholm, Denmark	-	Minor Bornholm; veroboard with component kit

== See also ==
- EMF Camp
- SHA 2017
- CCCamp
