= Jørgen Aabye =

Danish painter (1868–1959)

Jørgen Emil Aabye, born Olsen, (9 June 1868 – 22 June 1959) was a Danish painter. His works were varied widely, ranging from religious art to portraits and landscapes. Above all, he is remembered for his portraits.

== Early life ==
Born near Nørre Aaby on Funen, he was the son of a well-to-do farmer. He began studying painting under Vilhelm Kyhn in Copenhagen before attending the Royal Danish Academy of Fine Arts where he graduated in 1892. He then spent a couple of years at Zahrtmann's School in Copenhagen before completing his studies at J.F. Willumsen's school in Paris. As a student, he travelled widely to Germany, Italy and France. He changed his name from Olsen to Aabye in 1904.

== Career ==
Aabye came under many different influences during his studies. During his travels, he first associated with the Pre-Raphaelites before coming under the influence of Kristian Zahrtmann in Copenhagen and then J.F. Willumsen in Paris. His religious works such as the altarpiece of Christ in the Garden of Gethsemane in Nørre Aaby Church and his paintings of the Annunciation of the Blessed Virgin Mary were inspired by the Pre-Raphaelites or by Carl Bloch. Later he turned to landscapes which have a strong affinity to the work of Cézanne. His finest works are his portraits which display the joy of Naturalism's colour he had learnt from Zahrtmann and Willumsen.

Aabye frequently exhibited at Charlottenborg (starting in 1892). From 1900, for a period of 40 years he spent every summer in Skagen becoming one of the younger generation of Skagen Painters. He spent his last 30 years at the Kunstnerhjemmet (Artists' Home) in Copenhagen. His works include landscapes, interiors, floral paintings, portraits and genre subjects.

== Literature ==
- Hans Buch (2008), Maleren Jørgen Aabye, Middelfart Museum, 226 pages. (in Danish)
