= Båring =

Town in Funen, Denmark

- Town
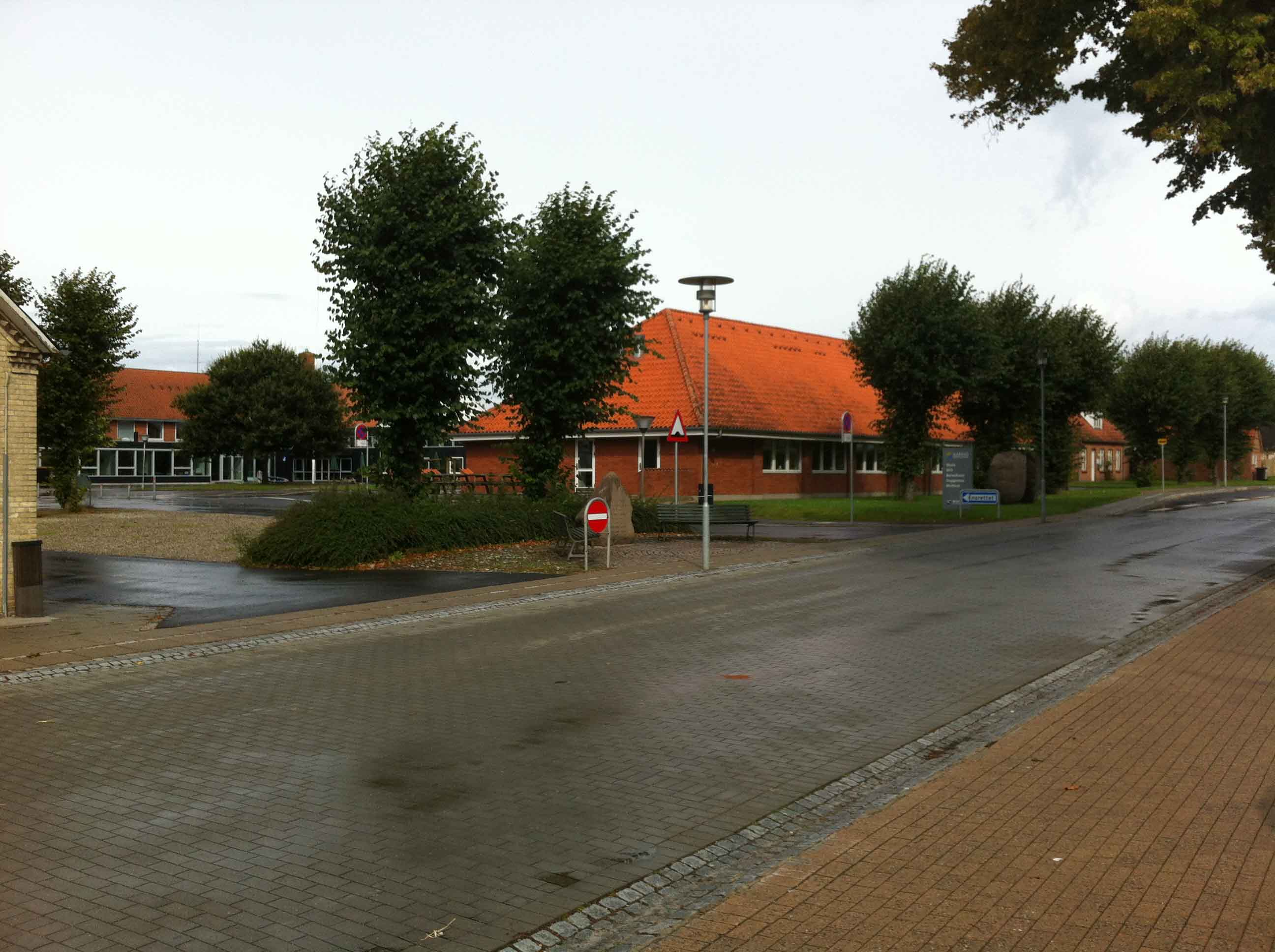
- Båring school

- Location in the Region of Southern Denmark Båring (Denmark)
- Coordinates: 55°29′22″N 9°54′34″E
- Country: Denmark
- Region: South Denmark
- Municipality: Middelfart Municipality

Population (2026)
  - Total: 960
- Time zone: UTC+1 (CET)
  - Summer (DST): UTC+2 (CEST)

Båring is a small town in Middelfart municipality on Funen, Denmark with a population of 960 (1 January 2026). Prior to the Kommunalreformen ("The Municipality Reform" of 2007) it was part of Nørre Aaby municipality, and is situated close to the sea on the north-west coast of Funen.
