= Fænø =

Small Danish island

Coordinates: 55°29′18″N 9°41′37″E

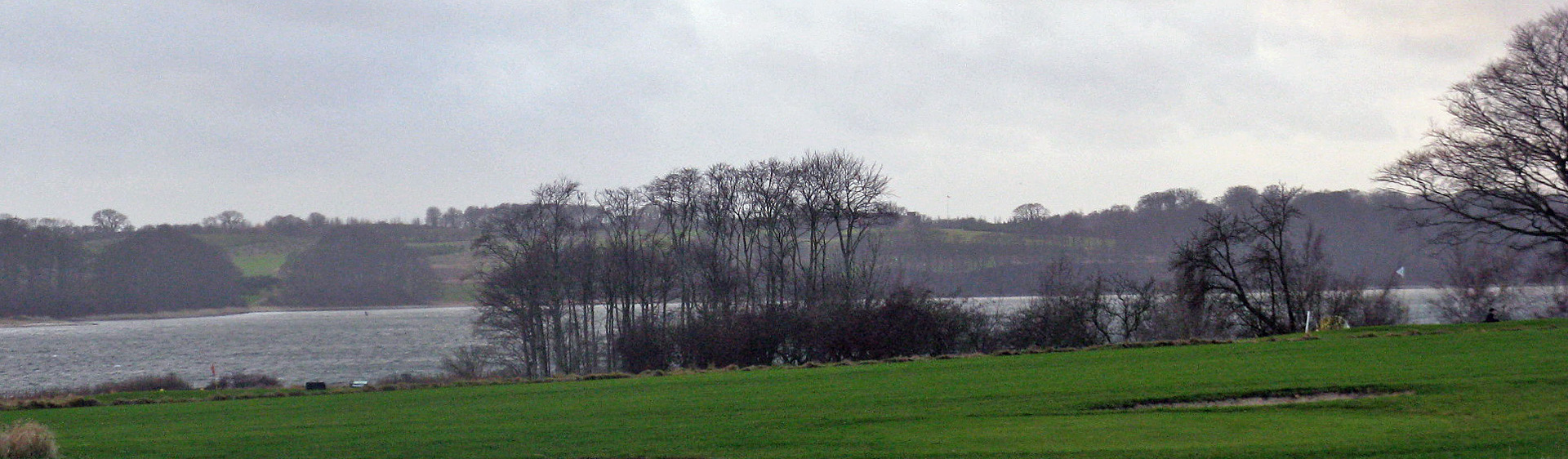
- Fænø seen from Funen

Geography
- Location: Little Belt
- Area: 3.9 km^{2} (1.5 sq mi)

Administration
- Denmark
- Region: South Denmark Region
- Municipality: Middelfart Municipality

Demographics
- Population: 2 (2010)
- Pop. density: 0.51/km^{2} (1.32/sq mi)

Fænø is a small Danish island in the Little Belt off the west coast of Funen in Middelfart Municipality. With an area of 3.9 km^{2}, as of 1 January 2010 it has a population of just 2. Reaching a height of 39 metres above sea level at its highest point, the island is privately owned. Fænøgård, which used to be the island's farm, has now been completely rebuilt in an architecturally modern style. It caters for private parties and has residential facilities. The island is separated from Funen by the 500-meter-wide Fænø Sund and can be reached by private ferry.

== Fænøgård ==
Built in the middle of the 18th century, Fænøgård used to be the island's farmhouse. However, in 2000, Flemming Skouboe, former owner of LM Glasfiber, a Danish windmill firm, purchased the island. He replanted the estate with 700,000 trees and bushes, and put up a three-winged red-brick building designed by schmidt hammer lassen, a Danish architectural firm. Completed in 2005, it houses works by a number of Danish artists including Asger Jorn, Per Kirkeby, P.S. Krøyer, Carl-Henning Pedersen, Christian Lemmerz and Michael Kvium. In addition to the modern manor house, there are also four separate buildings to accommodate guests. The facilities can be used by private groups, for banquets, hunting parties or to experience the island's natural environment.

== See also ==
- List of islands of Denmark
- Middelfart Municipality
