= Gelsted =

- Town
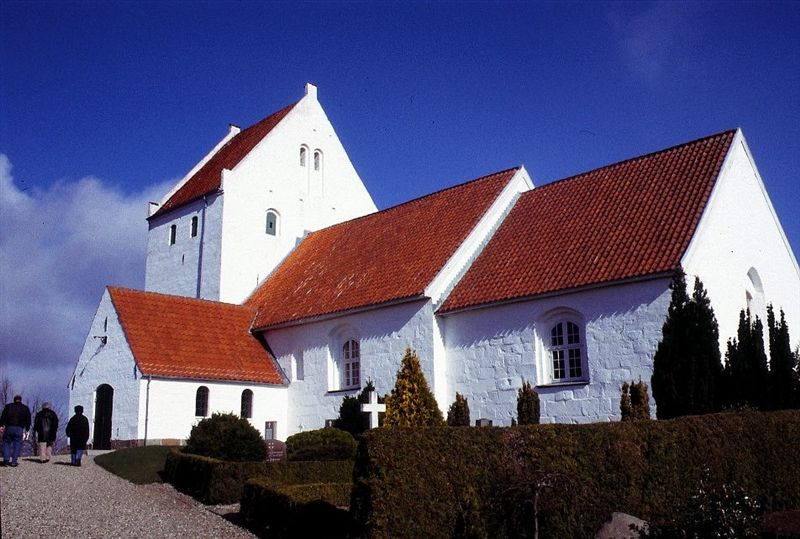
- Gelsted Church

- Location in the Region of Southern Denmark
- Coordinates: 55°23′53″N 9°58′17″E
- Country: Denmark
- Region: Southern Denmark
- Municipality: Middelfart

Area
  - Urban: 1.45 km^{2} (0.56 sq mi)

Population (2026)
  - Urban: 1,676
  - Urban density: 1,160/km^{2} (2,990/sq mi)
- Time zone: UTC+1 (CET)
  - Summer (DST): UTC+2 (CEST)

Gelsted is a small town and parish in northwestern Funen, Denmark. Gelsted is located roughly halfway between Ejby and Aarup, 28 kilometers west of Odense. The parish is located in Middelfart Municipality, and a small portion is located in Assens Municipality, within the Region of Southern Denmark. 1 January 2026 the town had a population of 1,676 and the parish had a population of 2,293 (1 January 2026). Gelsted Church is located on the northwestern outskirts of the town.

The annual BornHack camp has been organized near Gelsted since 2019.

== People ==
- Kirsten Thorup (born 1942 in Gelsted), a Danish author, several of her novels are set in the town.
- Helene Blum (born 1979 in Gelsted) a Danish singer and musician who specializes in folk music
