= Nørre Aaby Municipality =

Former municipality in Denmark

Coordinates: 55°27′N 9°54′E

Until 1 January 2007 Nørre Aaby municipality was a municipality (Danish, kommune) in the former Funen County on the north and west coasts of the island of Funen in southern Denmark. The municipality covered an area of 65 km^{2}, and had a total population of 5,626 (2006). Its last mayor was Hanne Christensen, a member of the Venstre (Liberal Party) political party. The main town and the site of its municipal council was the town of Nørre Aaby. To the north are the waters of Båring Cove (Båring Vig) and beyond that the Kattegat. To the west are the waters of Fem's Cove (Fems Vig) and beyond that the Little Belt.

Part of the former municipality formed a spit of land that juts out into the surrounding waters of the Little Belt. The water between the spit and the main part of the municipality is called Gamborg Fjord. Close to the head of the spit is the island of Fænø, and beyond that the Jutland mainland, all in proximity to each other. The waters to the north of this area are called Snævringen ("The Narrowing"); and to the south as there becomes more room they are called Bredningen ("The Broadening").

Nørre Aaby municipality ceased to exist as the result of Kommunalreformen ("The Municipality Reform" of 2007). It was merged with Ejby and Middelfart municipalities to form an enlarged Middelfart municipality. This created a municipality with an area of 297 km^{2} and a total population of 36,417 (2006). The municipality belong to Region of Southern Denmark.
