= Middelfart =

- Town
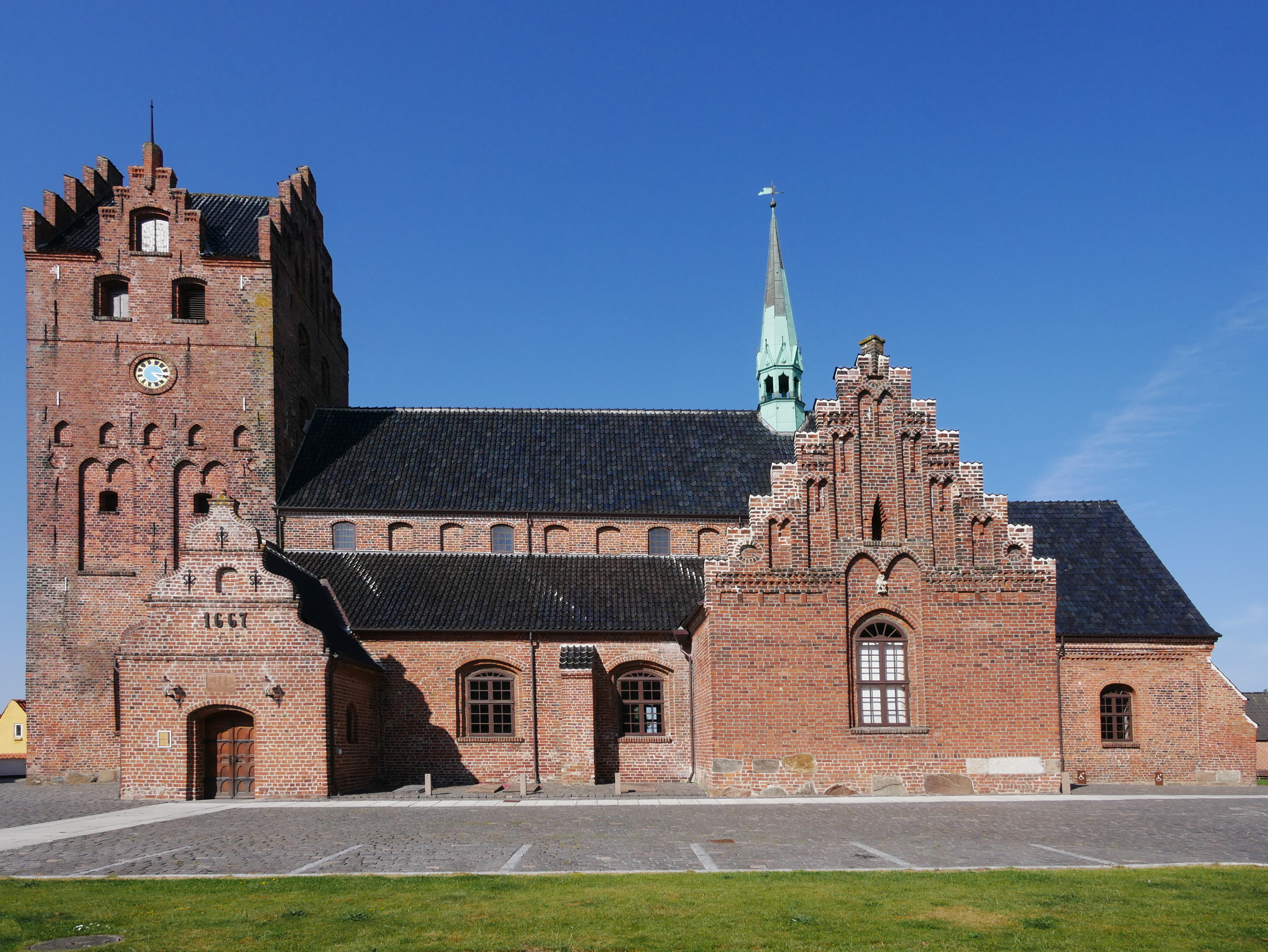
- Saint Nicolaus Church

- Coat of arms

- Location in Denmark Middelfart (Region of Southern Denmark)
- Coordinates: 55°29′55″N 9°44′40″E
- Country: Denmark
- Region: Southern Denmark (Syddanmark)
- Municipality: Middelfart
- First documented: 1231
- City charter: 1496
- Municipal charter: 1970

Area
  - Urban: 11.6 km^{2} (4.5 sq mi)

Population (2026)
  - Urban: 16,958
  - Urban density: 1,460/km^{2} (3,790/sq mi)
  - Gender: 8,167 males and 8,791 females
- Demonym: Middelfarter
- Time zone: UTC+1 (CET)
  - Summer (DST): UTC+2 (CEST)
- Postal code: 5500
- Area code: (+45) 3
- Website: www.middelfart.dk

Middelfart is a town in central Denmark, with a population of 16,958 as of January 2026. The town is the municipal seat of Middelfart Municipality on the island of Funen (Danish: Fyn).

== Etymology ==
The name Middelfart, first recorded as "Mæthælfar" in Valdemar's Census Book in 1231, consists of the old Danish word mæthal meaning 'middle' and far meaning 'way'. This name originally referred to the strait Snævringen ('the narrowing'), which is the narrowest part of the Little Belt, and was subsequently applied to the settlement as well.

== History ==
It is not known when the town was established but it certainly owes its existence to its location at the narrowest point across the Little Belt. The town was granted its first privileges at the end of the 13th century at a time when fishing played an important role in addition to its ferry link to Snoghøj in Jutland. From the Middle Ages the town appears to have specialized in catching harbour porpoises. In the 16th century cattle export was also significant.

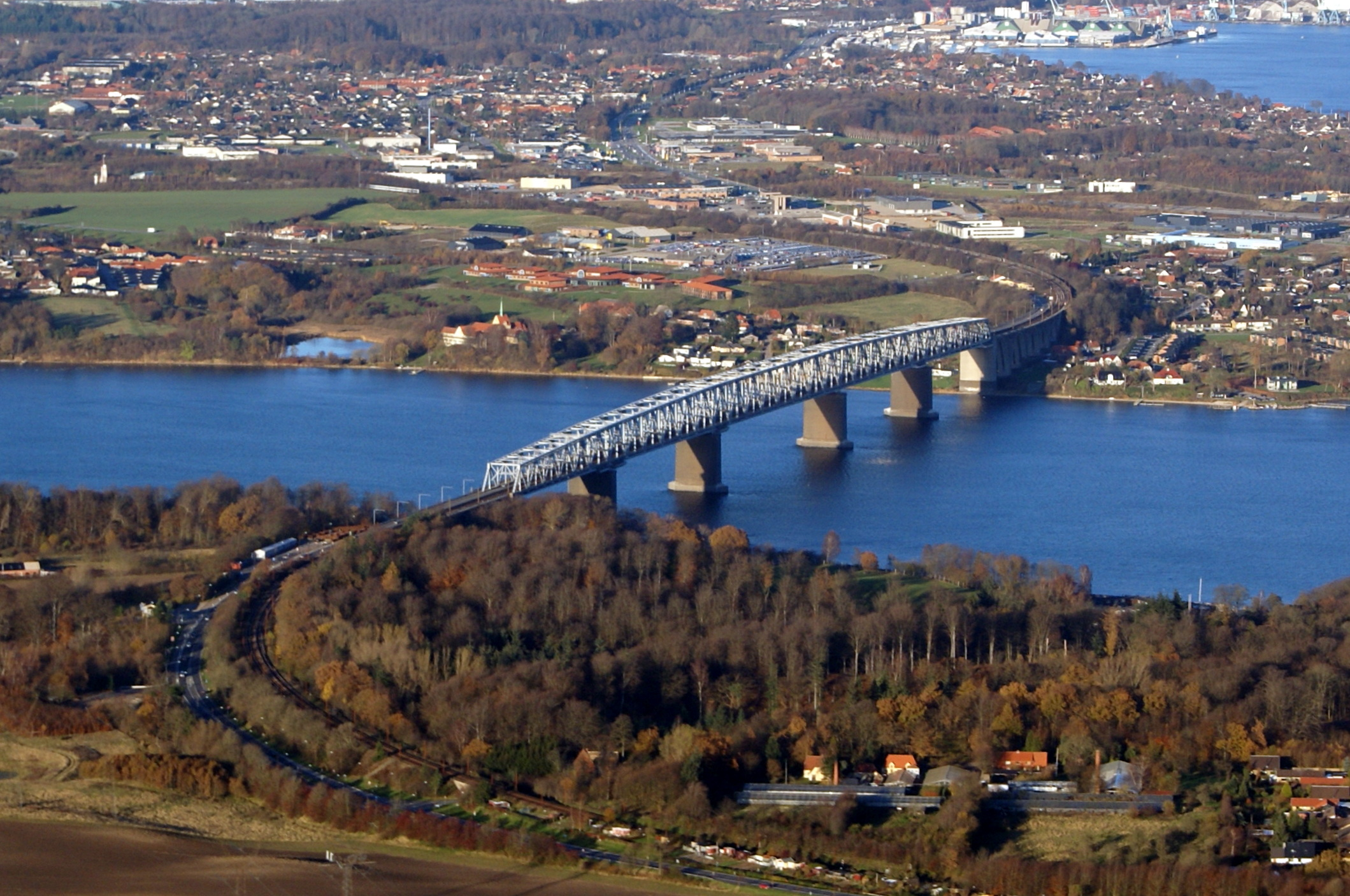
The Old Little Belt Bridge just northwest of Middelfart

After the Swedish Wars in the 17th century the town suffered from losing its foreign export privileges and from competition from Fredericia on the other side of the belt, which not only had a ferry link to Strib but levied customs duties on traffic through the Little Belt. In the 18th century income from porpoise catches diminished but in the 19th century, with the establishment of its own harbour in 1836, conditions improved thanks in particular to the growing trade in agricultural products from the surrounding areas. From the mid-19th century small industries started to develop, especially the iron foundry. The rail link between Middelfart and Nyborg opened in 1865, bringing added prosperity despite the fact that it connected with the ferry from Strib rather than the one from Middelfart.

By the beginning of the 20th century, the iron foundry, with about a hundred workers, was the town's main industry. After the first Little Belt Bridge was completed in 1935 Middelfart became an important hub for traffic between Jutland and Funen. The population grew from 2,345 in 1880 to 11,056 in 1950 but in the second half of the 20th century the rate of growth declined. In 1970 a motorway bridge to Jutland was opened and in 2007 Middelfart became the seat of an expanded municipality, which included the former communes of Ejby and Nørre Aaby.

== Economy ==
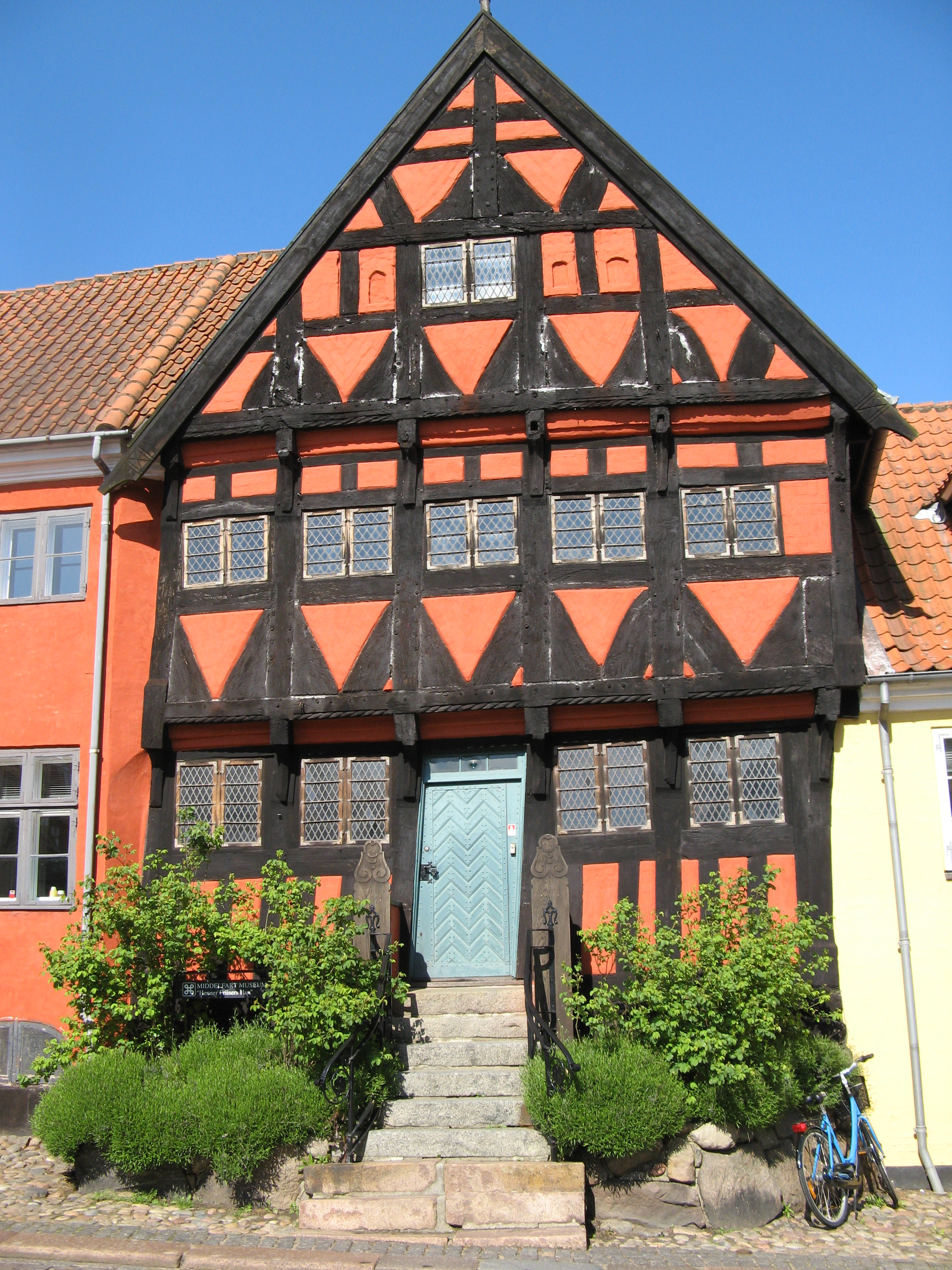
The half-timbered Henner Friiser Hus, now a museum

Middelfart Municipality had a population of 37,685 in January 2014.

From the Middle Ages until the end of the 19th century the local fishermen were also whale hunters in winter. The only cetacean common in Danish waters is the harbour porpoise (Phocoena phocaena). The whale hunters linked their boats across the rather narrow Little Belt and by beating the sea with sticks and branches they directed the migrating porpoises to low water areas where they could be slaughtered. As the whale blubber was used for lamps, indoors and outdoors, the arrival of electricity made whale hunting uneconomical. In the winter of 1854–55, 1742 whales were caught, but a normal winter's catch would be half that or even less. In the 20th century the hunt was resumed during the two world wars. Two memorial stones now stand where the hunters landed the whales and where blubber was prepared.

== Transportation ==
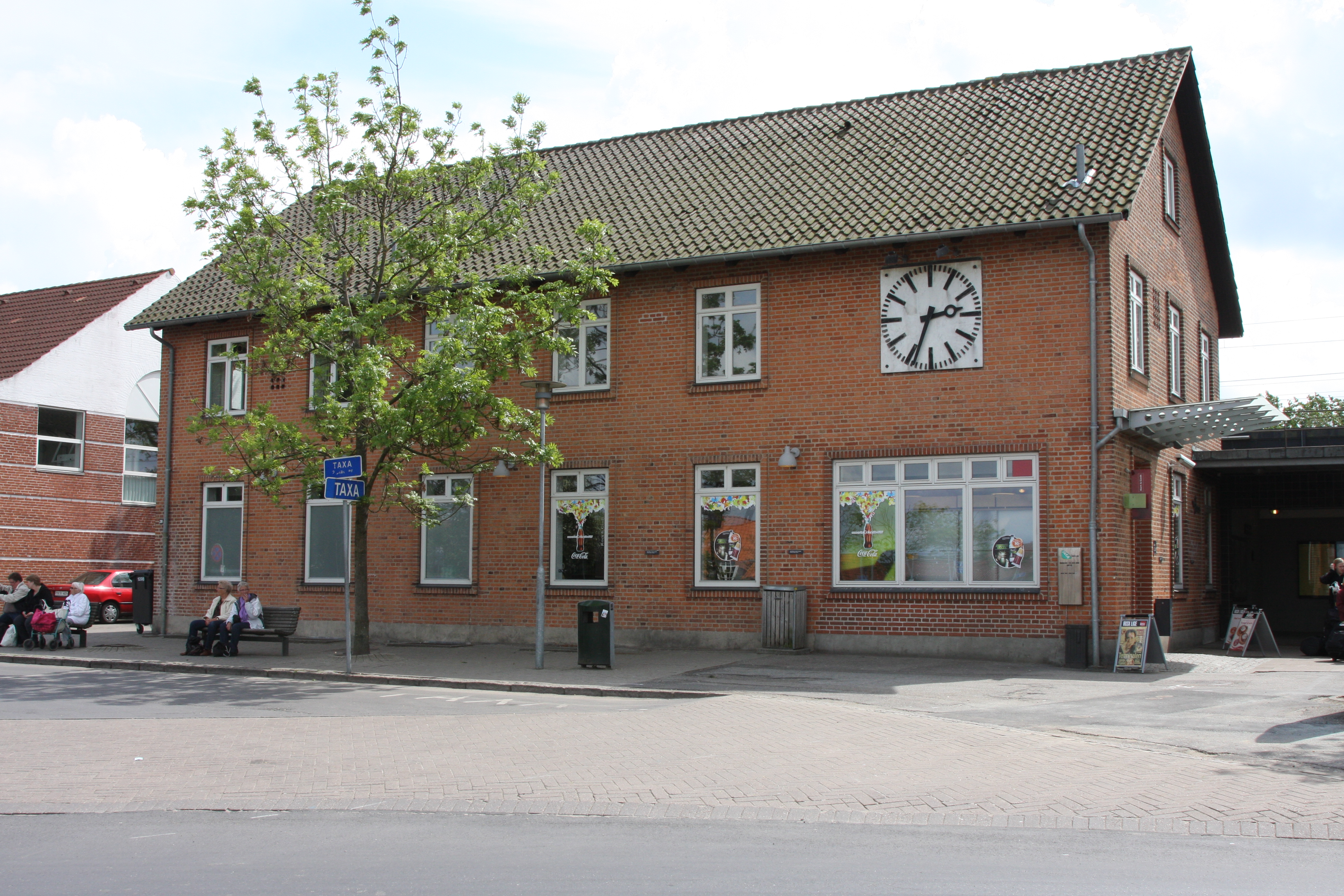
Street facade of Middelfart railway station.

Middelfart is served by Middelfart railway station which is served by the passenger rail service between Copenhagen and Jutland. It is located on the Copenhagen–Fredericia/Taulov Line which connects the Danish capital, Copenhagen, and the Jutland peninsula by way of the islands of Zealand and Funen. It offers direct InterCity services to Copenhagen, Odense, Aalborg, Aarhus and Esbjerg as well as regional train services to Fredericia and Odense.

Gammel Havn (Old Harbour) dates from the 1830s. At the beginning of the 20th century, it was extended and deepened to the east.

== Landmarks ==
Middelfart Church, dedicated to St Nicholas, is located close to the harbour at the end of Algade. Built in several stages, it has a Late Romanesque chancel, a tower first constructed in the 14th century and a nave with aisles from the late 15th century. The richly carved altarpiece is from 1650.

Henner Friiser Hus, a half-timbered house on Brogade dating from around 1575, is now part of Middelfart Museum and contains exhibitions related to the history of the town. Restoration work on the building was completed in March 2014.

The Kulturøen (literally, "Culture Island") Cultural Centre contains the public library, a cinema, a restaurant, a café and the tourist office.

== Sport ==
Middelfart is home to football team Middelfart G&BK. Middelfart played host to the 1998 UCI World Cyclocross championships.

== Notable people ==
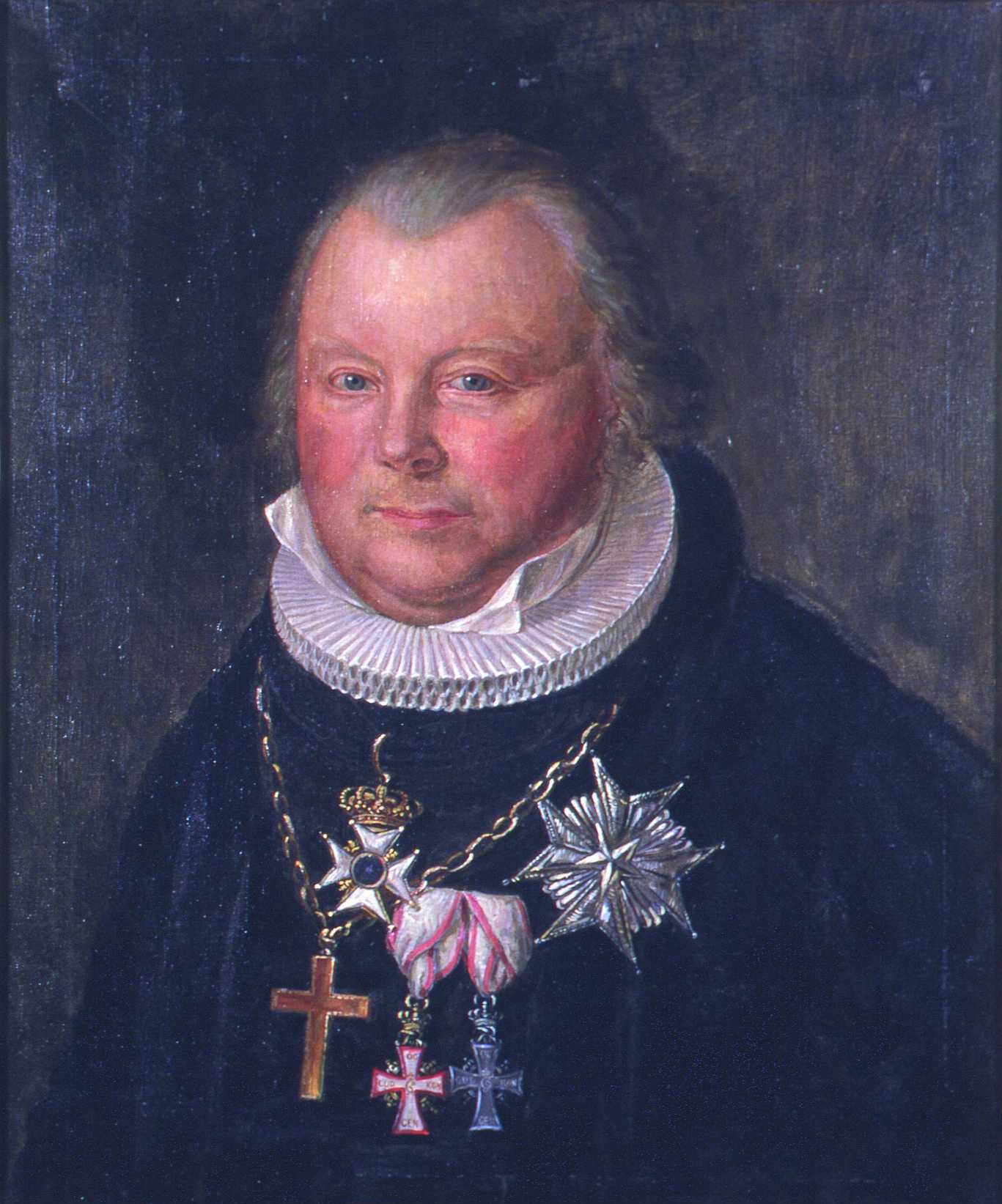
Frederik Julius Bech, 1814

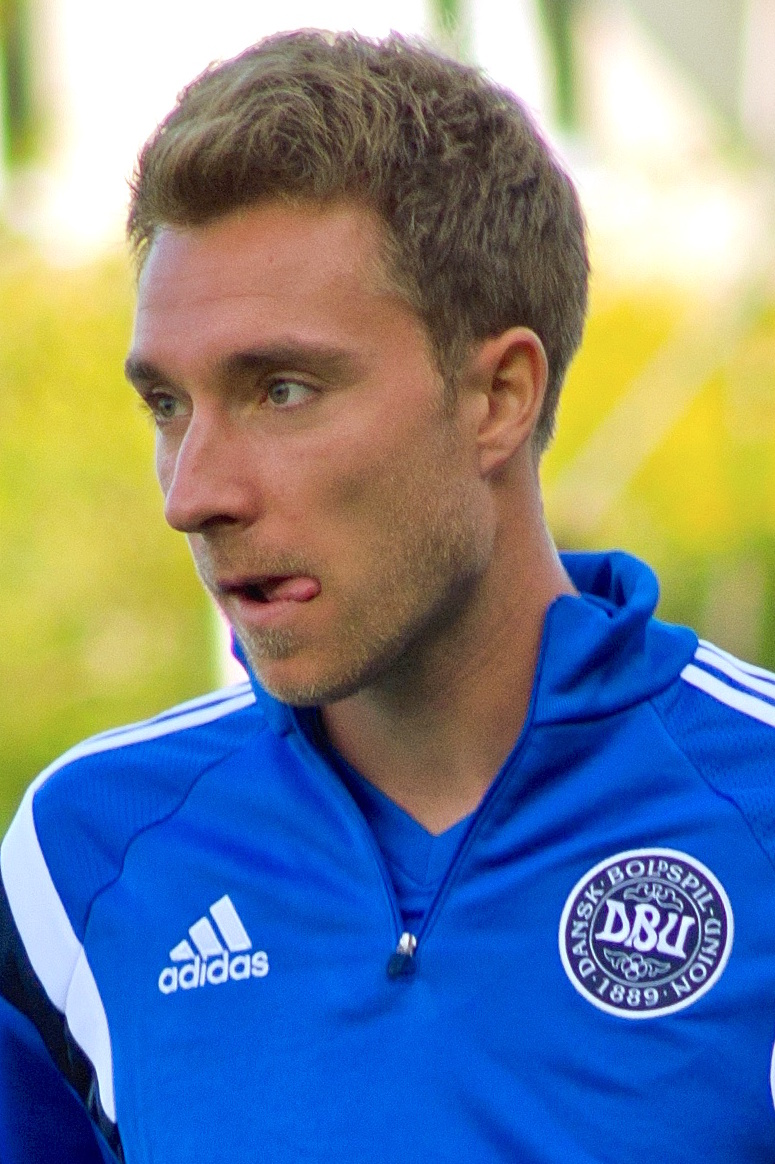
Christian Eriksen

- Frederik Julius Bech (1758 in Middelfart – 1822) was a Danish-Norwegian theologian and politician
- Frida Schmidt (1849 in Middelfart – 1934) a Danish teacher, suffragist and a pioneering activist for the Danish Women's Society
- Christian Schrøder (1869 in Middelfart – 1940) a film actor, screenwriter and director
- John Wittig (1921 in Middelfart – 1987) a Danish film actor
- Poul Ove Jensen (born 1937 in Kauslunde) a Danish architect, particularly of bridges
- Pernille Weiss (born 1968 in Gamborg, Middelfart) a Danish politician, and businesswoman; MEP and CEO of Archimed
- Kristian Jensen (born 1971 in Middelfart) is a Danish politician and government Minister
- Lonnie Kjer (born 1972 in Middelfart) a Danish singer, represented Denmark in the Eurovision Song Contest 1990
- Michael Eggert (born 1975 in Middelfart) an entrepreneur in the rental market
- Else Schøtt (1895–1989), opera singer

=== Sport ===
- Christian Eriksen (born 1992 in Middelfart) a footballer
- Rasmus Falk (born 1992 in Middelfart) a footballer, with 260 club caps
- Rasmus Quist Hansen (born 1980 in Middelfart), a rower, gold and bronze Olympic medallist
- Søren Madsen (born 1976 in Middelfart) rower, bronze medallist at the 2000 Summer Olympics
- Jan O. Pedersen (born 1962 in Middelfart) former speedway rider, 1991 World Champion

== Twin towns – sister cities ==
Middelfart is twinned with:

- Oskarshamn, Sweden
