= Ejby Municipality =

Former municipality in Denmark

Coordinates: 55°025′047″N 9°055′045″E

Until 1 January 2007 Ejby Municipality was a municipality (Danish, kommune) in Funen County on the north and west coasts of the island of Funen in southern Denmark. The municipality included the island of Brandsø, covered an area of 163 km^{2}, and had a total population of 10,046 (2005). Its last mayor was Claus Hansen, a member of the Venstre (Liberal Party) political party. The main town and the site of its municipal council was the town of Ejby.

The municipality was created in 1970 by a kommunalreform ("Municipality Reform") that combined the following parishes: Balslev, Brenderup, Ejby, Fjelsted, Gelsted, Harndrup, Husby, Ingslev, Tanderup, and Ørslev.

Ejby municipality ceased to exist as the result of Kommunalreformen ("The Municipality Reform" of 2007). It was combined with existing Middelfart and Nørre Aaby municipalities to form an enlarged Middelfart Municipality. This created a municipality with an area of 297 km^{2} and a total population of 36,113 (2005). The municipality belongs to the Region of Southern Denmark.

== Attractions ==
- Fun Park Fyn (Fyns Sommerland)
- Gelsted Marked
- Tybrind
- Wedellsborg
