= Nørre Aaby =

- Town
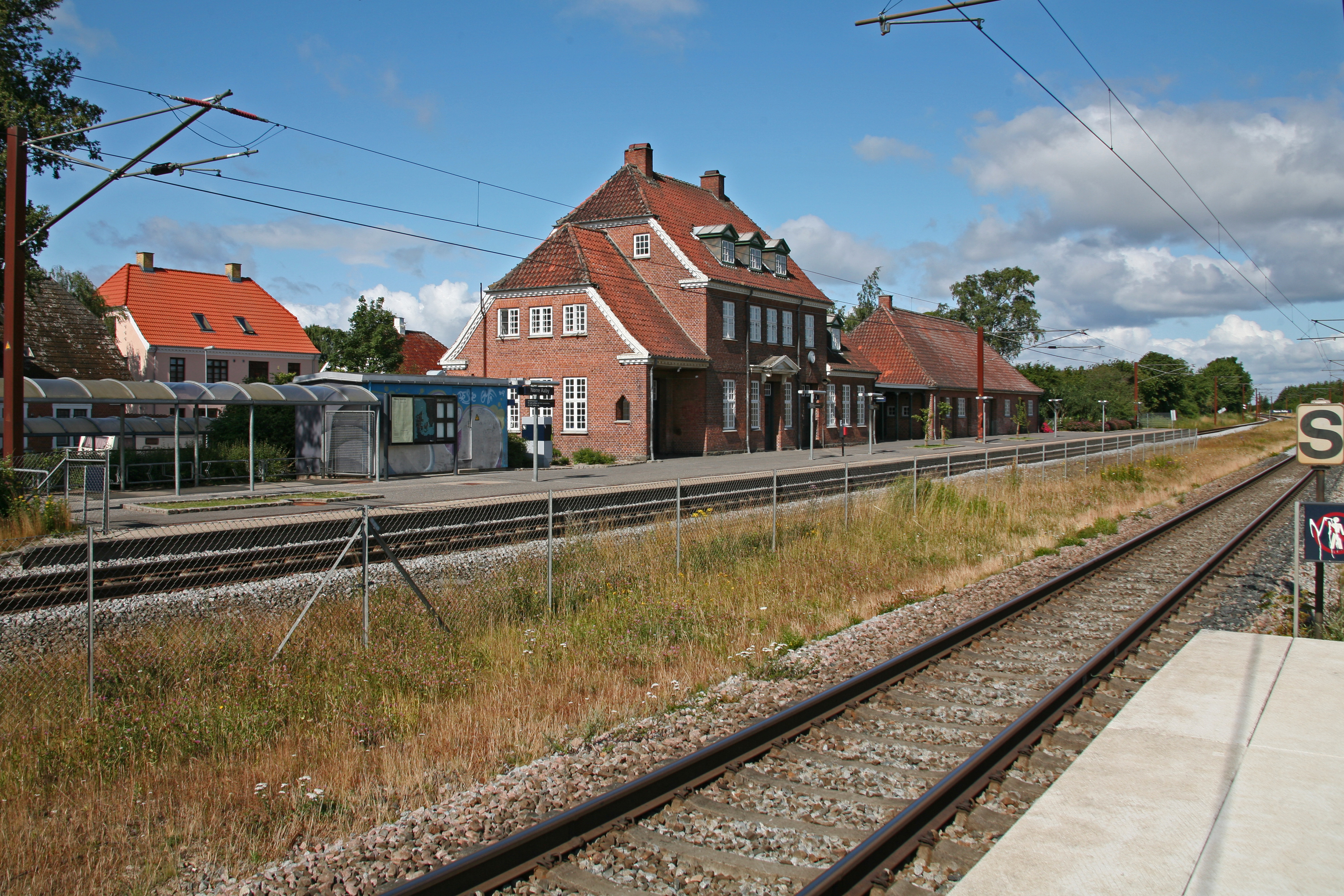
- Nørre Aaby railway station

- Location in Denmark Nørre Aaby (Region of Southern Denmark)
- Coordinates: 55°27′28″N 9°52′39″E
- Country: Denmark
- Region: Southern Denmark
- Municipality: Middelfart

Area
  - Urban: 2.3 km^{2} (0.89 sq mi)

Population (2026)
  - Urban: 3,129
  - Urban density: 1,400/km^{2} (3,500/sq mi)
  - Gender: 1,518 males and 1,611 females
- Time zone: UTC+1 (CET)
  - Summer (DST): UTC+2 (CEST)
- Postal code: DK-5580 Nørre Aaby

Nørre Aaby is a town in central Denmark, located in Middelfart Municipality on the island of Funen. Until Kommunalreformen ("The Municipality Reform" of 2007) it was the site of the municipal council of the now former Nørre Aaby Municipality.

The town is most known for the great number of efterskoler located around the town: Viby Efterskole, Båring Efterskole, Vesterdal Efterskole, Nørre Åby Efterskole and Eisbjerghus Efterskole.

The population of Nørre Aaby is 3,129 (1 January 2026).

Nørre Aaby is served by Nørre Aaby railway station located on the railway line across Funen.

== Notable people ==
- Jørgen Aabye (1868 in Nørre Aaby – 1959) a Danish painter of religious art, portraits and landscapes
- Søren Absalon Larsen (1871 in Nørre Aaby – 1957) a Danish physicist who worked on electroacoustics gave his name to the Larsen effect
