= Middelfart Municipality =

Middelfart Municipality Middelfart Kommune (Danish)
- Municipality
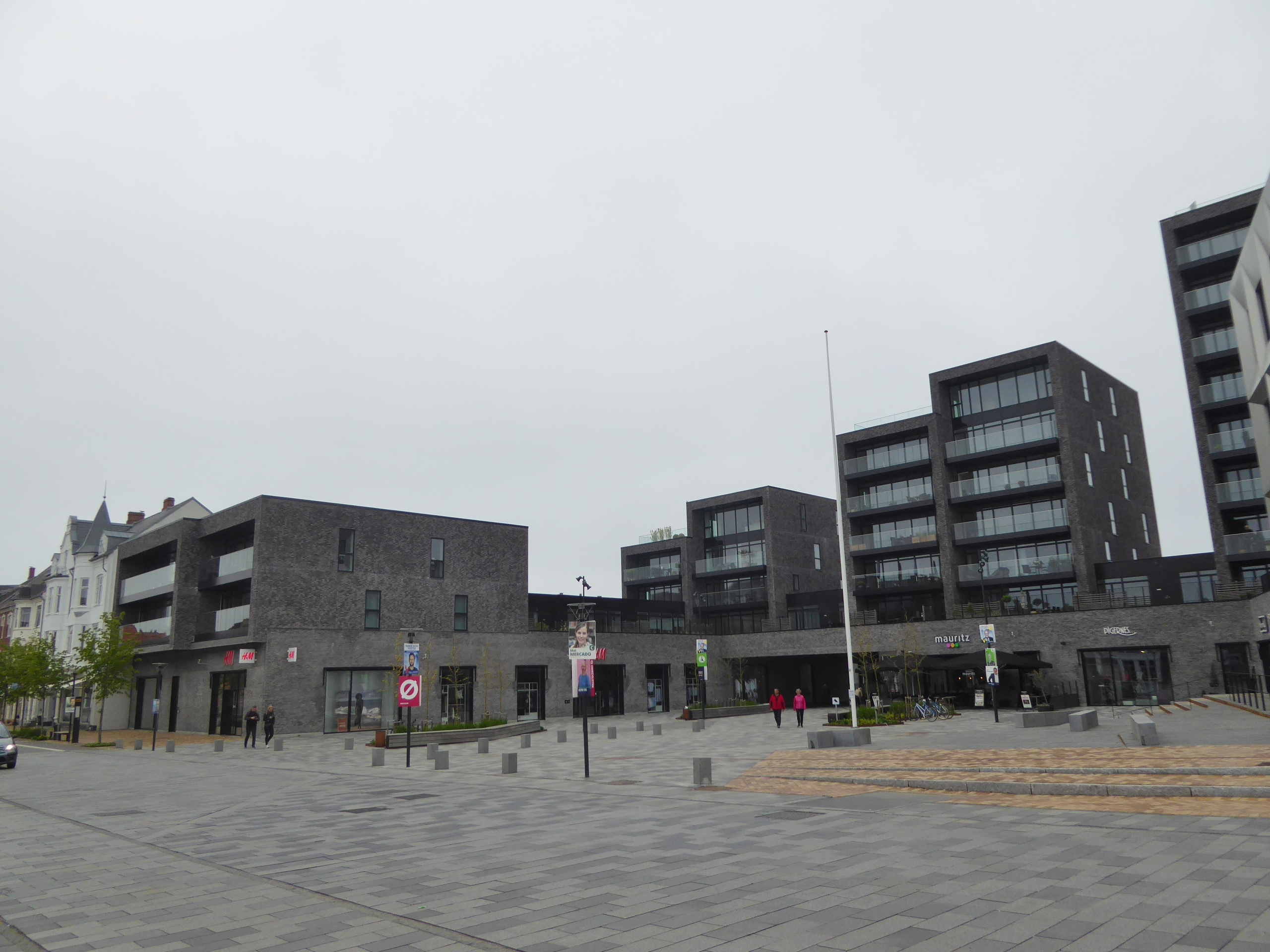

- Coat of arms

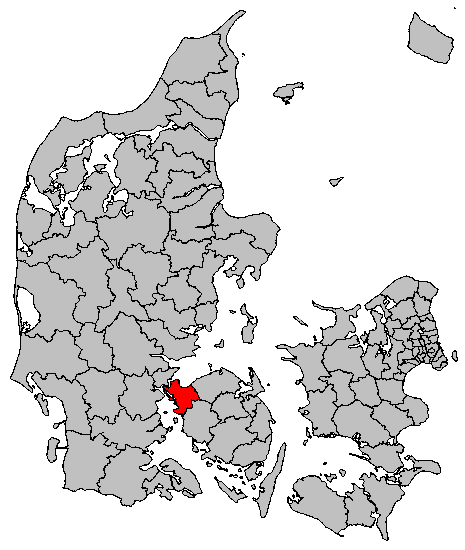
- Location in Denmark
- Coordinates: 55°30′N 9°45′E
- Country: Denmark
- Region: Southern Denmark
- Established: 1 January 2007

Government
  - Mayor: Anders Møllegård

Area
  - Total: 297 km^{2} (115 sq mi)

Population (1. January 2026)
  - Total: 40,625
  - Density: 137/km^{2} (354/sq mi)
- Time zone: UTC+1 (CET)
  - Summer (DST): UTC+2 (CEST)
- Postal code: 5500
- Website: www.middelfart.dk

Middelfart Municipality (Danish: Middelfart Kommune) is a kommune in the Region of Southern Denmark, located on the west coast of the island of Funen in southern Denmark. The municipality covers an area of 297 km^{2} and has a total population of 40,625 (2026). Its mayor is Johannes Lundsfryd Jensen, a member of the Social Democrats (Socialdemokraterne) political party. The main town and the site of its municipal council is the town of Middelfart.

The Snævringen ("The Narrowing"), is the strait that separates the island of Funen from the Jutland mainland in this area, where the two lie very close to each other, often less than 1.5 km apart. Snævringen is an extension of the Kattegat, and begins near the cities of Fredericia and Middelfart. To the south of the municipality is Fænø Strait (Fænø Sund), which separates Funen from the municipality's island of Fænø.

On 1 January 2007 Middelfart municipality was, as the result of The Municipal Reform, merged with Ejby and Nørre Aaby municipalities to form an enlarged Middelfart municipality.

The municipality is part of Triangle Region and of the East Jutland metropolitan area, which had a total population of 1.378 million in 2016.

== Locations ==
Middelfart	16,000
Strib	4,700
Nørre Aaby	3,000
Ejby	2,100
Gelsted	1,700
Brenderup	1,400
Båring	940
Harndrup	620
Kauslunde	520

== Economy ==
Companies headquartered in the municipality include United Shipping & Trading Company.

== Politics ==
Middelfart's municipal council consists of 25 members, elected every four years. The municipal council has seven political committees.

=== Municipal council ===
Below are the municipal councils elected since the Municipal Reform of 2007.

Election	Party								Total seats	Turnout	Elected mayor
Election	A	B	C	F	H	O	V	Ø	Total seats	Turnout	Elected mayor
2005	12	1	2	1	1	1	7		25	73.1%	Steen Dahlstrøm (A)
2009	11	1	2	3		2	6		25	69.2%	Steen Dahlstrøm (A)
2013	11	1	2	1		3	6	1	25	77.0%	Steen Dahlstrøm (A)
2017	14		1	1		2	6	1	25	76.8%	Johannes Lundsfryd Jensen (A)
Data from Kmdvalg.dk 2005, 2009, 2013 and 2017

== Sources ==
- Municipal statistics: NetBorger Kommunefakta, delivered from KMD aka Kommunedata (Municipal Data)
- Municipal mergers and neighbors: Eniro new municipalities map
