= Strib =

Town in Denmark

- Town
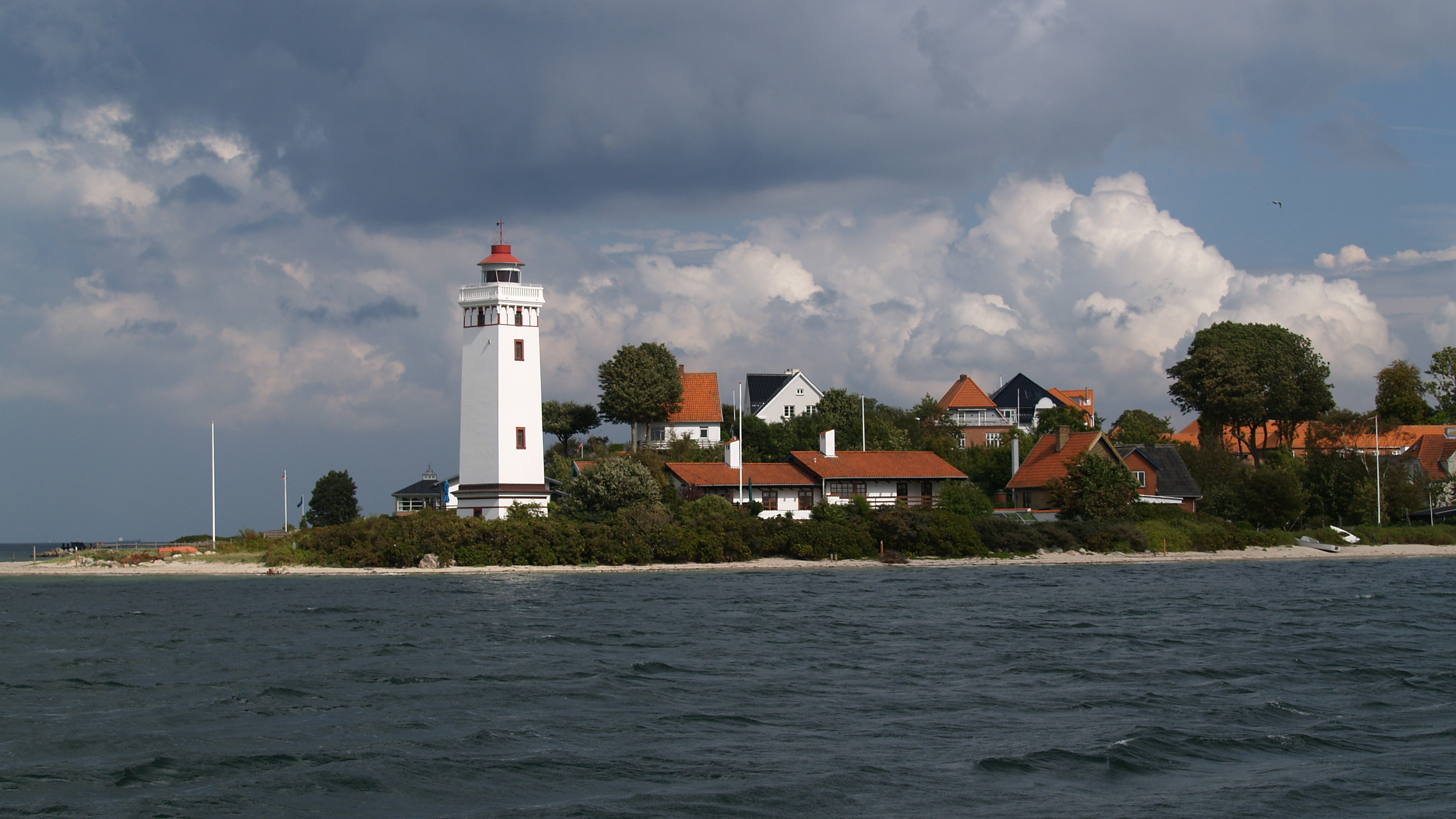
- Strib lighthouse at the northern entrance of the Little Belt, Denmark

- Location in Denmark Strib (Region of Southern Denmark)
- Coordinates: 55°32′15″N 9°46′21″E
- Country: Denmark
- Region: Southern Denmark
- Municipality: Middelfart

Area
  - Urban: 3.4 km^{2} (1.3 sq mi)

Population (2026)
  - Urban: 5,285
  - Urban density: 1,600/km^{2} (4,000/sq mi)
  - Gender: 2,585 males and 2,700 females
- Time zone: UTC+1 (CET)
  - Summer (DST): UTC+2 (CEST)
- Postal code: DK-5500 Middelfart

Strib is also the nickname of the Minneapolis Star Tribune

Strib is a town in Region of Southern Denmark, Denmark, with a population of 5,285 (1 January 2026). The closest large towns are Middelfart and Fredericia. The town lies at an altitude just a few meters above sea level on the island of Funen. Strib is the second wealthiest parish in Denmark outside the Greater Copenhagen area in terms of household income.

Strib has an excellent marina, a modern sports center, and good shopping opportunities. Strib's main landmark is an old white lighthouse. Fishing, swimming and surfing are popular pastimes in Strib. Sea trout and cod are found year-round near the old lighthouse. Rainfall in Strib averages about 610mm (24 in.) per year, with September being the wettest month and April the driest. Strib has a temperate, maritime climate, with an average of seven to ten days of precipitation per month, and has many overcast days each year.

== History ==
The town of Strib has been in existence for approximately 350 years. Four years after nearby Fredericia had been fortified, and the beginnings of the fortification of Strib, these two towns controlled the movement between Jutland and Funen. The people managed to build a rampart on the island, to protect from attacks. Three bastions were also built, but the building of the rampart was given up for unknown reasons.

The next time Strib appears in history is when the railroad over Funen was finished in 1866. The settlers in the area were building a ferry port commenced operations. As the traffic increased and the town grew, around 1900 Strib became a fashionable place to spend summer vacations. Beach hotels appeared, music pavilions, and large villas, which were built along the cliffs on the north side of the peninsula.

The good summer life lasted until World War I. In the Fredercia fort a lot of hardship arose, because the people were not allowed to build outside the walls for many years. It was almost natural that the people went to Strib and started a building boom on both sides of Vestergade (Western Street) from around 1910 to 1920.

The town was considered a ferry-town until the opening of the first Little Belt Bridge in 1935. After the bridge opened, development almost came to a standstill. This economic stagnation lasted from about 1935 to 1950. The depression of the 1930s came to an end at the start of World War II. In the 1960s and 1970s and up until the present, Strib has developed much more. From 1962 to 1974 the abandoned ferry harbour housed the porpoise research station, one of the earliest research facilities in the world where the physiology and bioacoustics of harbour porpoises and harbour seals were studied. Today, the town is primarily a town of commuters, since there are not a lot of jobs or industry.

== Notable people ==
- Esther Vagning (1905 in Strib-Røjleskov – 1986) a pianist, performed widely in Denmark and abroad for over 50 years
- Ole Bjørnmose (1944 in Odense - 2006 in Strib) a football player, spent 11 seasons in the Bundesliga with SV Werder Bremen and Hamburger SV.
- Søren Kragh Andersen (born 1994 in Strib) a Danish cyclist, winner of stage 14 and 19 of the Tour de France 2020
