= Ejby, Middelfart =

Ejby
- Town
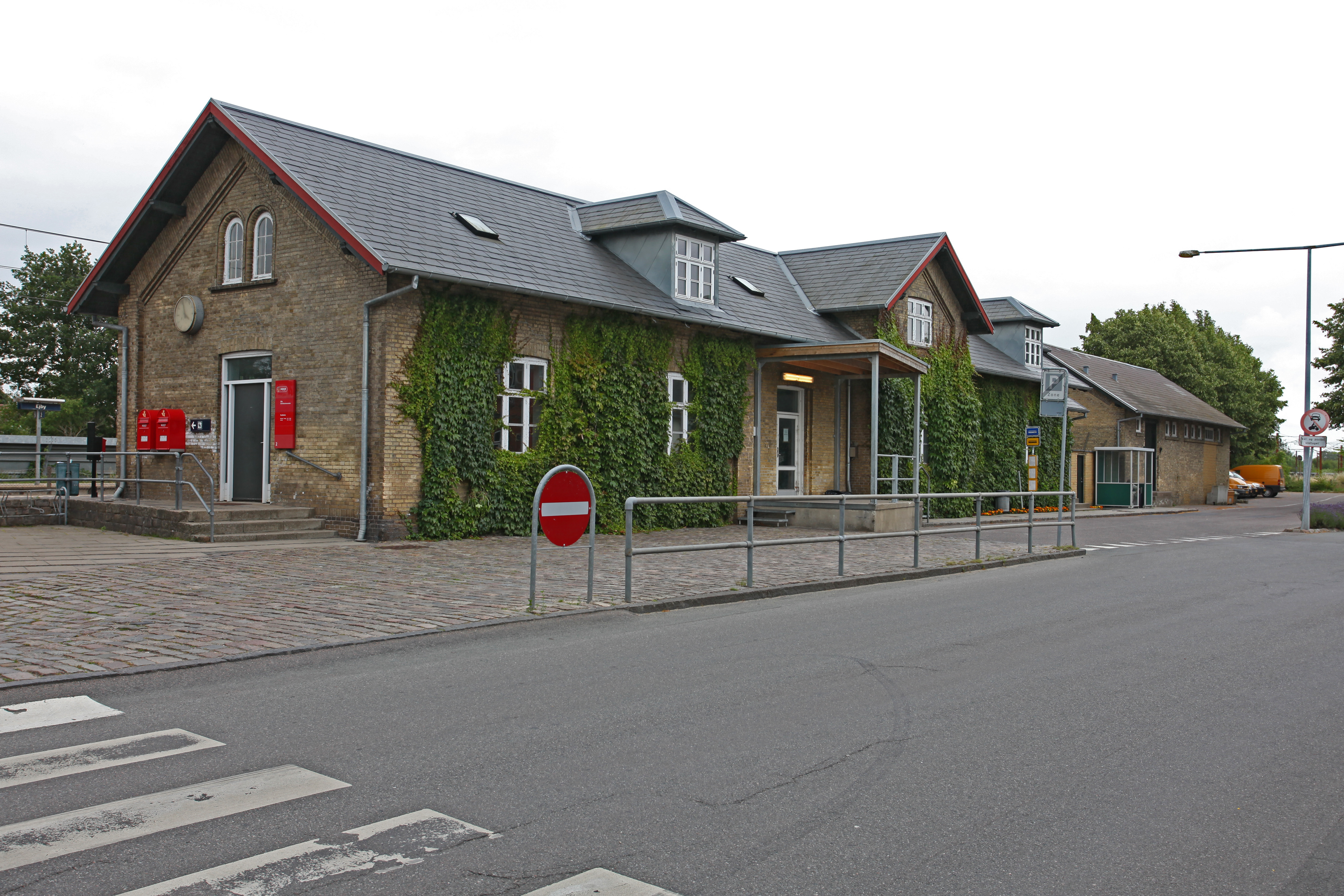
- Ejby railway station

- Location in Denmark Ejby (Region of Southern Denmark)
- Coordinates: 55°25′40″N 9°55′50″E
- Country: Denmark
- Region: Southern Denmark
- Municipality: Middelfart

Area
  - Urban: 1.95 km^{2} (0.75 sq mi)

Population (2026)
  - Urban: 2,181
  - Urban density: 1,120/km^{2} (2,900/sq mi)
- Time zone: UTC+1 (CET)
  - Summer (DST): UTC+2 (CEST)
- Postal code: DK-5592 Ejby

Ejby is a small railway town in Middelfart Municipality. It lies between Odense station and Middelfart station, on the island of Funen, Region of Southern Denmark, Denmark. It has a population of 2,181 (1 January 2026).

Until 1 January 2007, Ejby was the municipal seat of the former Ejby Municipality.
