= Hilsum =

Hilsum is a surname. Notable people with the surname include:

- Cyril Hilsum (1925–2026), British physicist and academic
- François Hilsum (1929–2020), French political activist and journalist
- Ian Hilsum (born 1981), English cricketer
- Karen Burt (née Hilsum; 1954–1997), British engineer and campaigner
- Lindsey Hilsum (born 1958), English television journalist and writer
