= Amnesty International UK Media Awards 1997 =

The Amnesty International UK Media Awards 1997 were first hosted by Janet Suzman on 18 June 1997 - Park Lane Hotel, London.

There were 7 awards in 6 categories: National Print, Periodicals, Photojournalism, Radio, Television Documentary and Television News. Two awards were issued in the National Print category.

The overall winner was Lindsey Hilsum, Diplomatic Correspondent for the ITN Channel Four News Team for her body of work over through 1996-97 from Rwanda and the former Zaire (Now Democratic Republic of the Congo)

The year's judges for all categories Keiko Itoh, (Note: At the time of the 1997 Awards, Keiko Itoh was Media Relations Consultant for The World Bank) John Mortimer QC, Norma Johnston, (Note: At the time of the 1997 Awards, Moram Johnston was Communications Director for Amnesty International UK) Sharon Welch, (Note: At the time of the 1997 Awards, Sharon Welch was Director of the London Millennium Festival) Marc Riboud, Cristina Odone and James Naughtie.

Following the awards, Peter Bottomley MP placed an Early day motion before the UK Parliament requesting that parliament agree "That this House notes the importance of the Amnesty International Press Awards, ...recognises that links with victims are usually achieved through the Press and broadcasters; and acknowledges that the search for the truth is sometimes a ticket to jail or worse for journalists."

== Awards 1997 ==
1997
Category	Title	Organisation	Journalists	Refs
National Print; Joint Winners
National Print; Joint Winners	Articles from Afghanistan	The Daily Telegraph	Alex Spillius	
National Print; Joint Winners	“Black Gold Fuels Columbia Killing Machine”	The Observer	David Harrison; Melissa Jones	
Periodicals
Periodicals	“Where Girls are Killed for Going to School”	Marie Claire	Lara Marlowe	
Photojournalism
Photojournalism	“The Highway to Hell”		Gary Knight	
Radio
Radio	“Chocolate Soldier from the USA”	BBC Radio South	Marc Jobst; George Pixley	
Television; Documentary
Television; Documentary	“Rwanda - The Betrayal”	Blackstone Pictures for Channel Four Witness	Lindsey Hilsum; Peter Bate	
Television; News
Television; News	“Women under the Veil”	ITN Channel Four News	Saira Shah	
