= Casio Film Card calculators =

Pocket calculator series

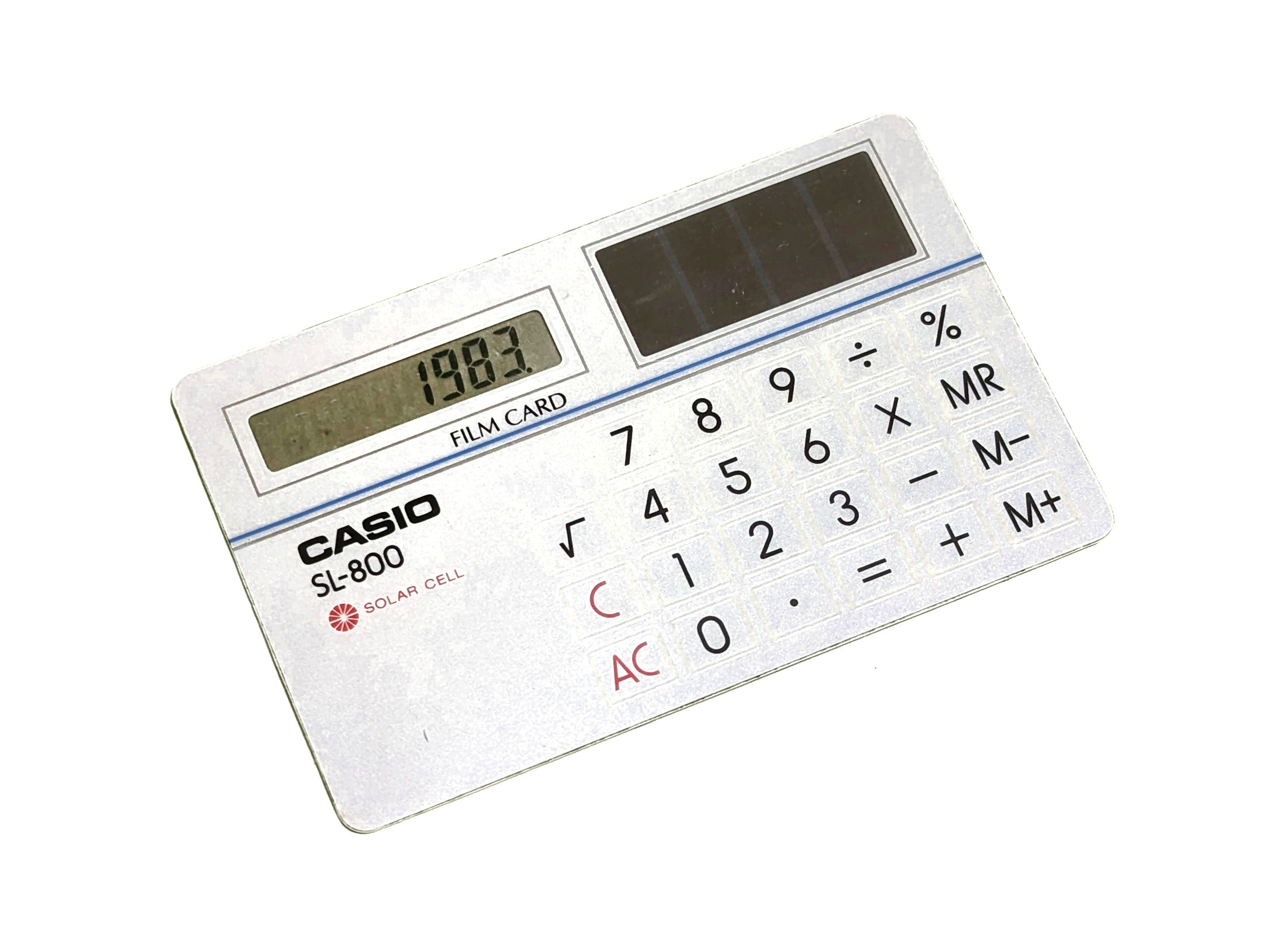
Casio SL-800 Film Card, the thinnest solar powered calculator produced in 1983

Casio Film Card was a series of credit card size ultra-slim solar powered pocket calculators produced in 1980s. Being the thinnest calculators in Casio's Slim Line series it became electronic badge and promotional merchandise branded by banks, luxury brands, airways, railways and other companies.

== Models ==
Data sources: official website, collectors websites.

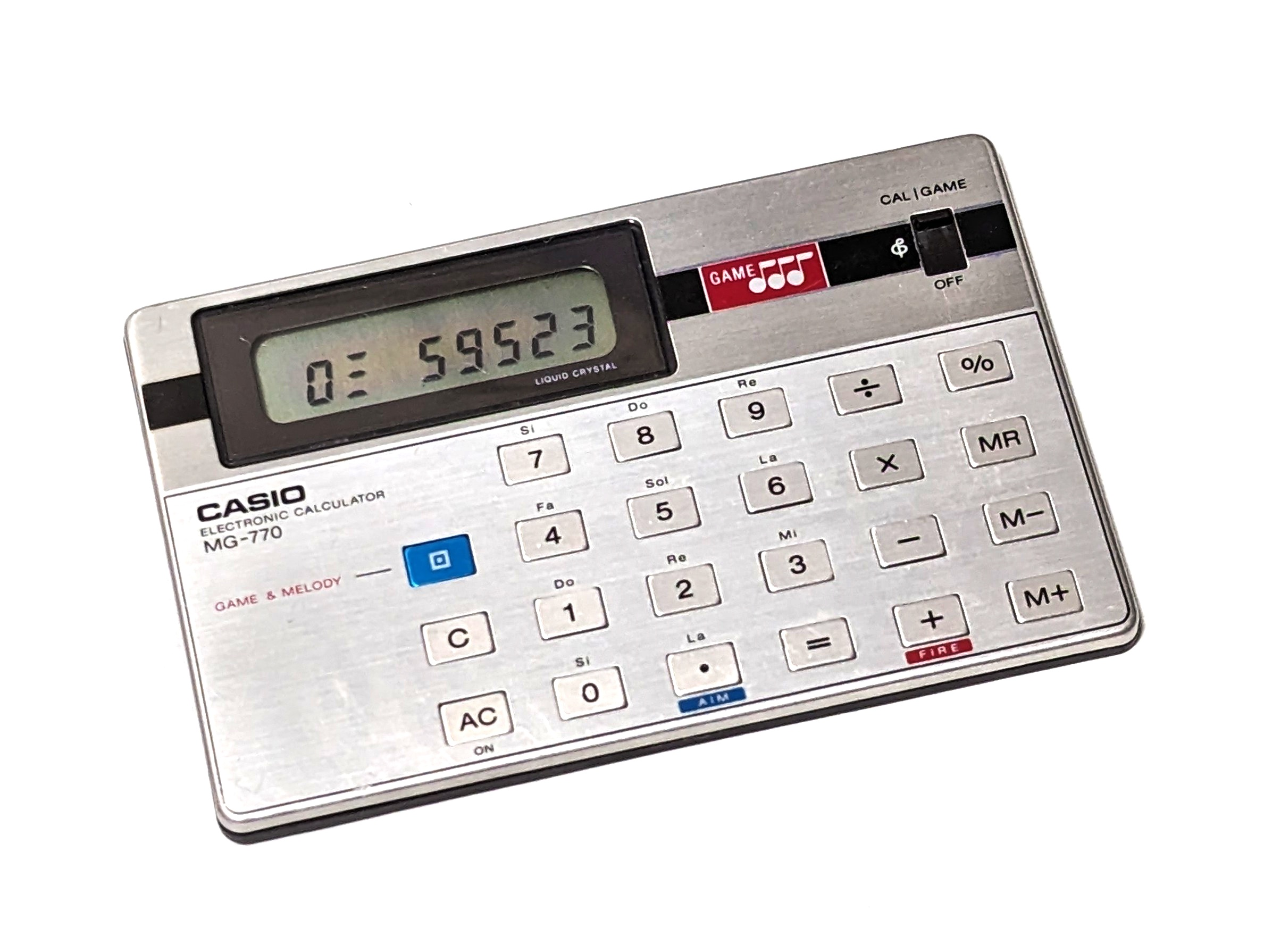
Casio MG-770 Game & Melody (with the "Invaders" game, a number line version of Space Invaders game for calculators)

=== Mini Card ===
The Film Card series was preceded by the Mini Card series introduced in 1978 with the LC-78 Mini Card, a battery powered credit card size basic calculator with only arithmetic, square root, percentage and memory register operations. Most of the models in this series have a metal case in a landscape orientation and low-profile elastomeric keypad with pushing plastic or metal caps, or silicone rubber keypad, also equipped with sliding switches to power on/off and mode switching.

- LC-78 (3.9mm tall; battery powered with CR2032 metal cased mixed with plastic, having sharp edges and corners)
- LC-791/.../797G
- LC-80 (full metal case and keys)
- SL-70/71 (2.0mm tall; SL-71 included the High-Power solar cell)
- SL-701/701G/70G (display with header line indicators, with color or golden plated frame, or fully golden plated)
- SL-702 (the High-Power solar cell)
- SL-720L (full plastic rounded case and buttons in a style of gamepad)
- ST-24 Card Time, PW-60, DC-600 Data-Cal and UC-360 ABC (alarm watches and calendars)
- ML-720 Melody Card and MG-770 Game & Melody (music and game calculators with a built-in melody synthesizer utilized digit input buttons as 11-note MIDI keyboard; this feature add in most of the battery powered calculator models of ML, MG, UC and Lady series, and was enhanced in the VL-Tone series of Casio's digital synthesizers).
- QA-70 Time Face (full plastic rounded with extra quartz clock display)
- DI-100 Travel Dictionary, DI-200 Business dictionary

=== Film Card ===
The Film Card series models commonly are less than 3mm tall ID-1 card size (85.5×54mm) designed in landscape orientation with a flat dustproof and waterproof keyboard with membrane switches, were addition button is double-wide. Casio noted "U.S. Pats. 4,121,284 4,371,923 4,942,516" on its back.

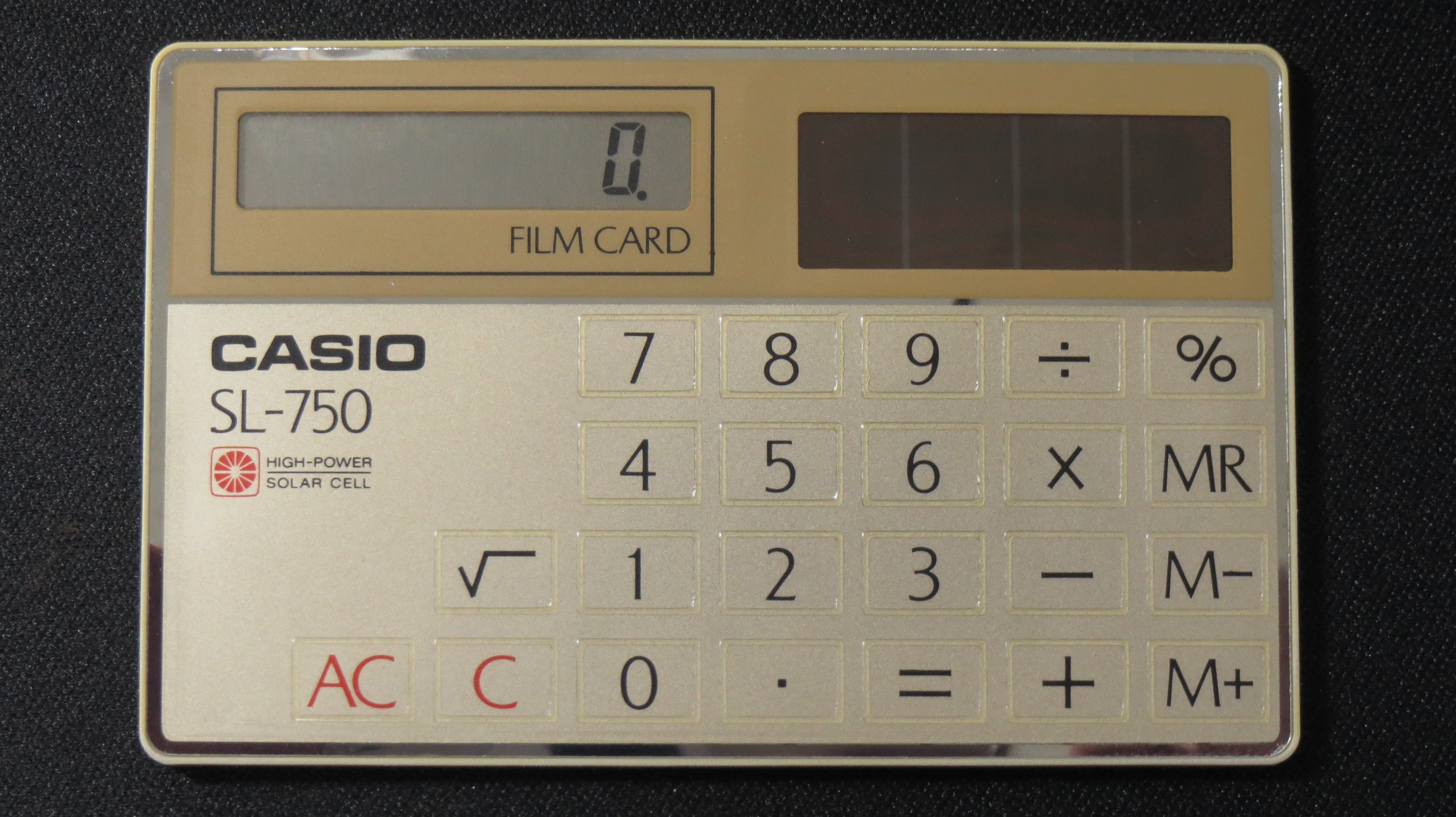
Casio SL-750 (all the same size buttons)

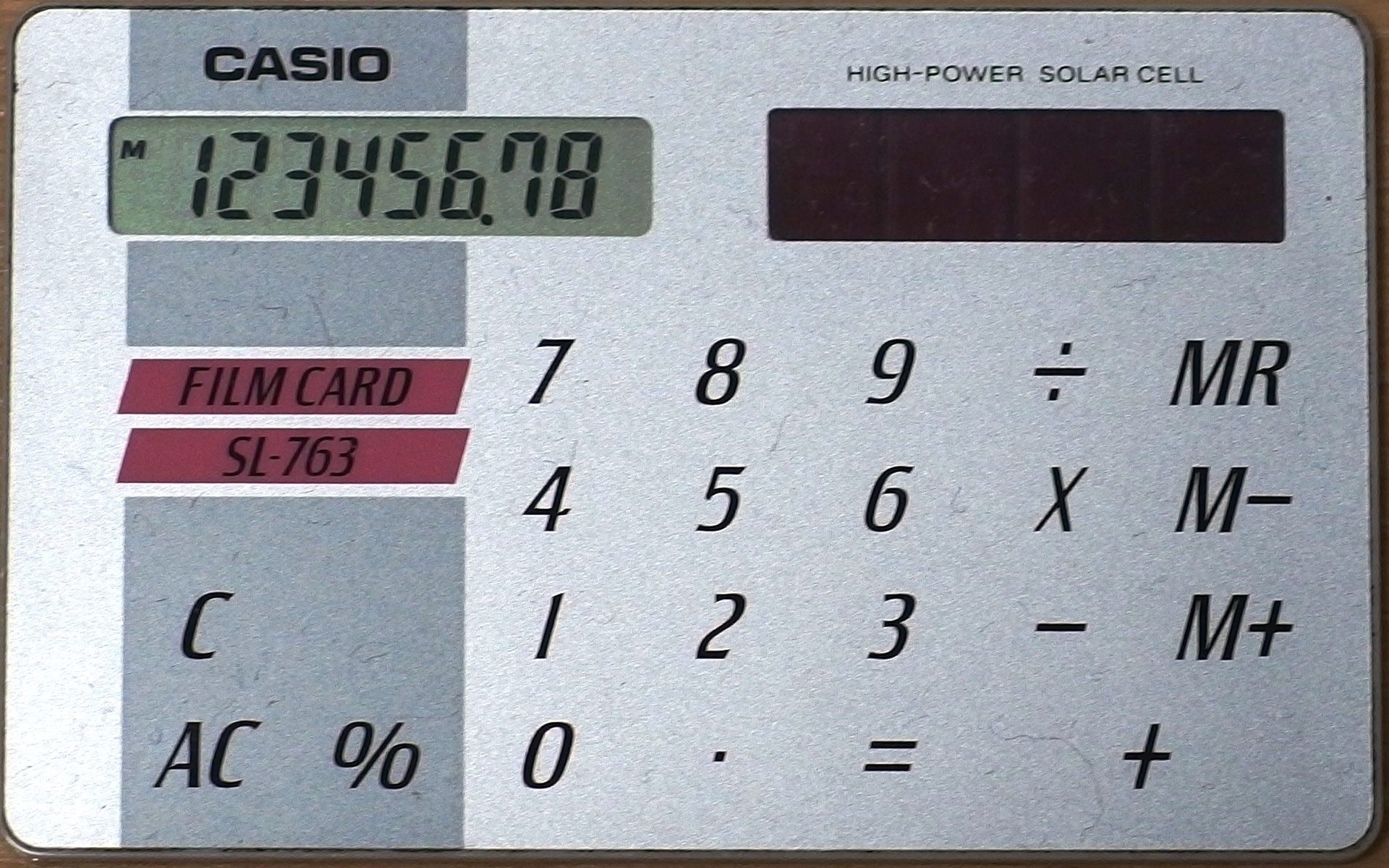
SL-763 (without square root button)

- SL-7 (clamshell Dual Leaf type with solid hinge, in folded state it less than ID-1 card size)
- SL-500 (2.6mm tall, clamshell Dual Leaf type with flex ribbon cable hinge, it is 3.7mm tall in folded state)
- SL-750 (1.9mm tall, with addition button in a regular size)
- SL-755 (not marked as Film Card, primarily used as The Walt Disney Company promotional series)
- SL-760/761/762/763/764 (commonly branded models)
  - SL-760ECO (MR button extended to MRC, not marked as Film Card, it also was "EURO 2012" branded merchandise; in FY2017 report Casio claimed SL-760ECO and SL-760GT as produced from up to 70% recycled plastic)
  - SL-760C (also marketed as the Solar Card, with the Super Solar cell)
  - SL-760LB (2.9mm tall, with larger display, Made in China)
  - SL-760LC (2.9mm tall, 15g weight, with the Super Solar cell)
  - SL-760LU (larger display and time calculation option, Made in Japan)
  - SL-760T (square root function replaced with markup calculation function)
  - SL-763 (High-Power solar cell and without square root button)
- SL-770 (2.5mm tall, designed in a portrait orientation)
- SL-777 (double-wide addition button)
  Casio SL-800
  - Operation manual (Printed in Japan)
  - Uncovered circuit board (front view)
- SL-800 (0.8mm tall, 12g weight, scaled down more compact keyboard layout providing more free space for ad placing, released November 1983 is the thinnest Casio calculator, with a magnetic strip on the back to make card be used as usual bank card or digital key; per official printed ad it has four layers: back plate layer, printed circuit board layer with soldered display and solar cell, machined solid metal frame layer and decorated front cover layer with a membrane keypad)
- SL-850 (3.0mm tall, with HMS button for difference in time calculation option)
- SL-900 (2.5mm tall, ID-2 card size designed in a portrait orientation, is an ultra-slim version of usual pocket size basic arithmetic calculator)
- SL-950 (full width keyboard layout with enlarged buttons to fit all the free space below display and solar cell)

=== Scientific calculators ===
Following the LC-78 Mini Card basic calculator, Casio developed same size scientific calculators:

- fx-48/58 (standard scientific calculator with 8 digit display, in a landscape orientation ID-1 card size; fx-48 had 32 functions in a total and headline indicators display; fx-58 was battery powered)
- fx-98/98B (version of fx-48 with 8+2 digit display and more functions; fx-98B model had additional nPr and nCr functions, and 45 scientific functions in a total)

Following the Film Card series, a series of ultra-slim scientific calculators was introduced as well:

- fx-88 (standard scientific calculator with 6+2 digit display, Dual Leaf type clamshell, less than ID-1 card size in folded state)
- fx-915/995 (standard scientific calculator with 8+2 digit display, in between of ID-2 card and ID-3 card, with a metric/imperial conversion table and cm/inch rulers on its back; fx-995 enhanced with 10+2 digit display and additional functions, such as Binary/Octal/Hexadecimal number modes for programmers, 9 physical constants and 76 scientific functions in a total)

=== Other ===
Models of the Film Card sub-series of SL (Slim Line) series and similar cards also introduced in many series, were the most common model designation was 700.

Film Card style models by Casio Series
Model	SL	BF	C	CB	CC	CV	DC	DC-E	DI	EZ	fx	LC	PN	PW	RD	RT	TH	UC
700	-	+	-	+	+	+	+	+	+	-	-	±	-	-	-	-	-	+
800	+	-	-	-	-	-	+	+	-	-	-	-	-	-	-	-	-	-
Other	+	-	+	-	+	-	+	-	+	+	+	±	+	+	+	+	+	+

C-800 Paper Card was version of Film Card calculator. D-50/60 Desktop solar powered ultra-slim flat square calculators released in a style of branded dustproof and waterproof calculators of the Film Card series.

TH-8 Crystal Cal was a version of the Film Card with a transparent resistive touchscreen keyboard (TH-10 is ID-2 card size; TH series also relates to OH series of overhead projectors calculators).

FM Card (battery powered RD-10, RD-11, RD-100), AM Card (battery powered RD-20, RD-21, and solar powered RD-220) and FM&AM Card (battery powered RD-30, RD-31) was series of credit card size FM/AM radio receivers with attachable headphones. As a part of these series introduced two side cards with a solar powered calculator on the opposite side:

- RD-80 Film Card & AM Card (5.8mm tall, basic calculator with AM mono radio receiver)
- RD-85 AM Radio & Data-Cal (5.8mm tall, AM mono radio receiver with calculator, phone book and diary pin code protection)
- RD-90 Film Card & FM Card (3.9mm tall, basic calculator with FM mono/stereo radio receiver)
- RT-20 AM Card (with calculator on same side and digital tuner with keyboard input frequency shown on display, and presets stored as memory registers)

Phone Card EZ-500/600 solar powered phonebooks in landscape orientation (instead of battery powered Phone Card EZ-200 phonebooks in portrait orientation).

Solar Data Bank DC-E700/E800 was a solar powered version of battery powered card size Data Bank DC series of personal organizers, enhanced with permanent memory encryption protection.

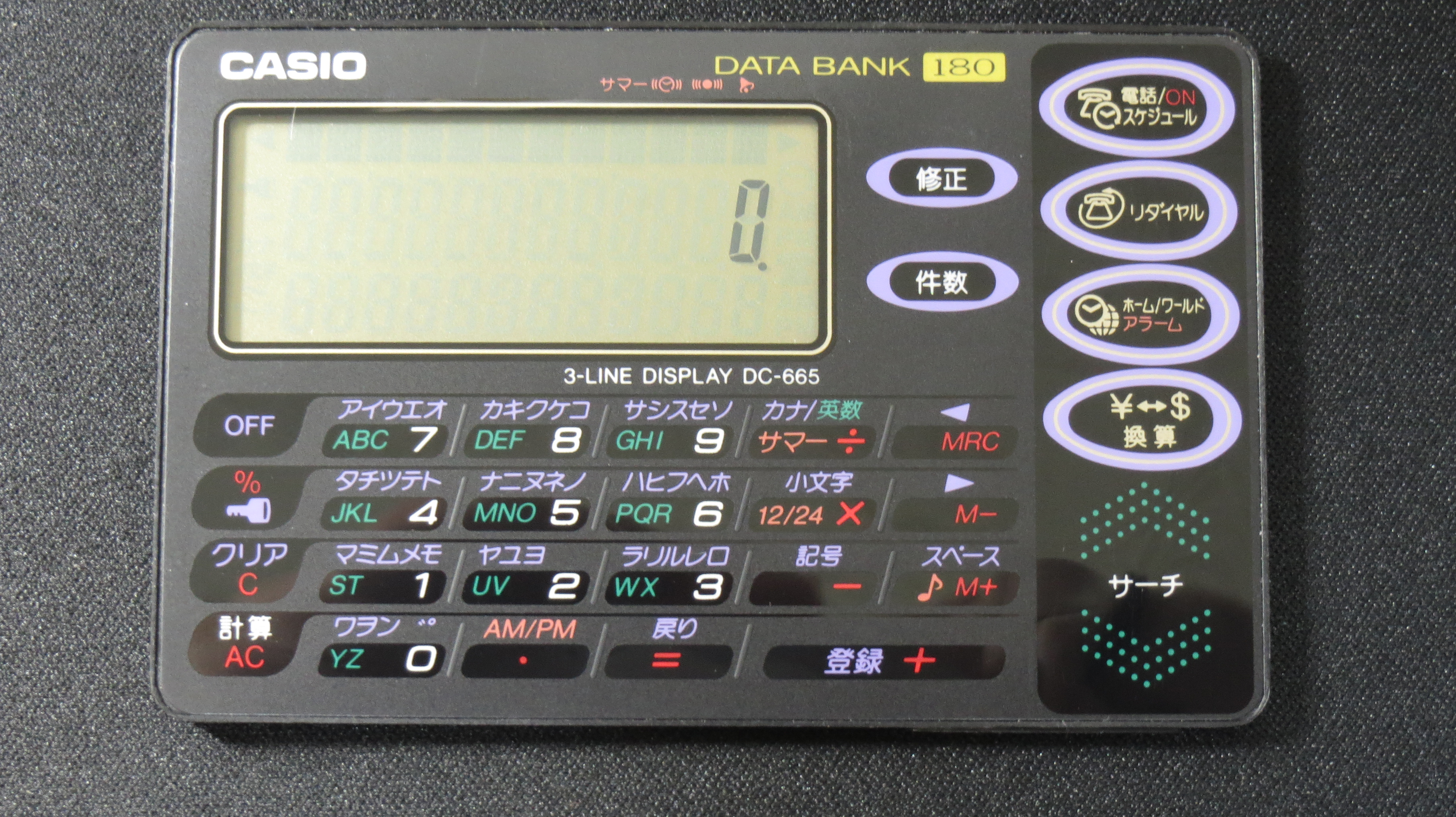
Casio DC-665 Data Bank (with 3-line display and ABC and Japanese input)

Other ultra-slim battery powered models included various features of personal digital assistant:

- Calculator & Watch PW-100/150 (with slider mode toggle, Time and Alarm buttons, and hourly time signal)
- Card Clock series: CC-100 (alarm clock, without calculator), CC-120U (alarm clock and world time watch, without calculator) and CC-130U (calculator and convertor, alarm clock, world time watch)
- Universal Calendar UC-700 (calculator with a calendar on a period of 1901-2099 with holidays and appointments, with up to 480 hours/cell work time)
- DI-700 Travel dictionary (English/French/Spanish/Japanese with QWERTY input, calculator and convertor)
- DI-2100 (English/Japanese dictionary with QWERTY input) and DI-2150 (with ABC input)
- Currency Convertor CV-700 (with markup calculation function)
- Financial Calculator BF-700 (with 3-line display and menu of functions)
- P.I.N. CODE CAL PN-50 (calculator, diary and with pin code protection)
- Check Book CB-700 (with pin code protection)
- Data-Cal DC-180/200 and DC-600/.../700/.../850 (personal diary, phone book, currency converter, alarm clock, calendar, etc., with pin code protection)

=== Micro Card ===
Casio Micro Card series introduced M-811 (also branded as "CASIO Lady" series) and M-812 key chain calculators are the next generation (less than 5mm tall, a half of ID-1 card size) of Casio's Micro Mini M-810 and Micro Compact MC-811 battery powered pure arithmetic matchbox size calculators (15mm tall).

== Technological impact ==
Casio development of Film Card series finalized miniaturization of solar powered ultra-slim card size calculators technologies, competed at the time by:

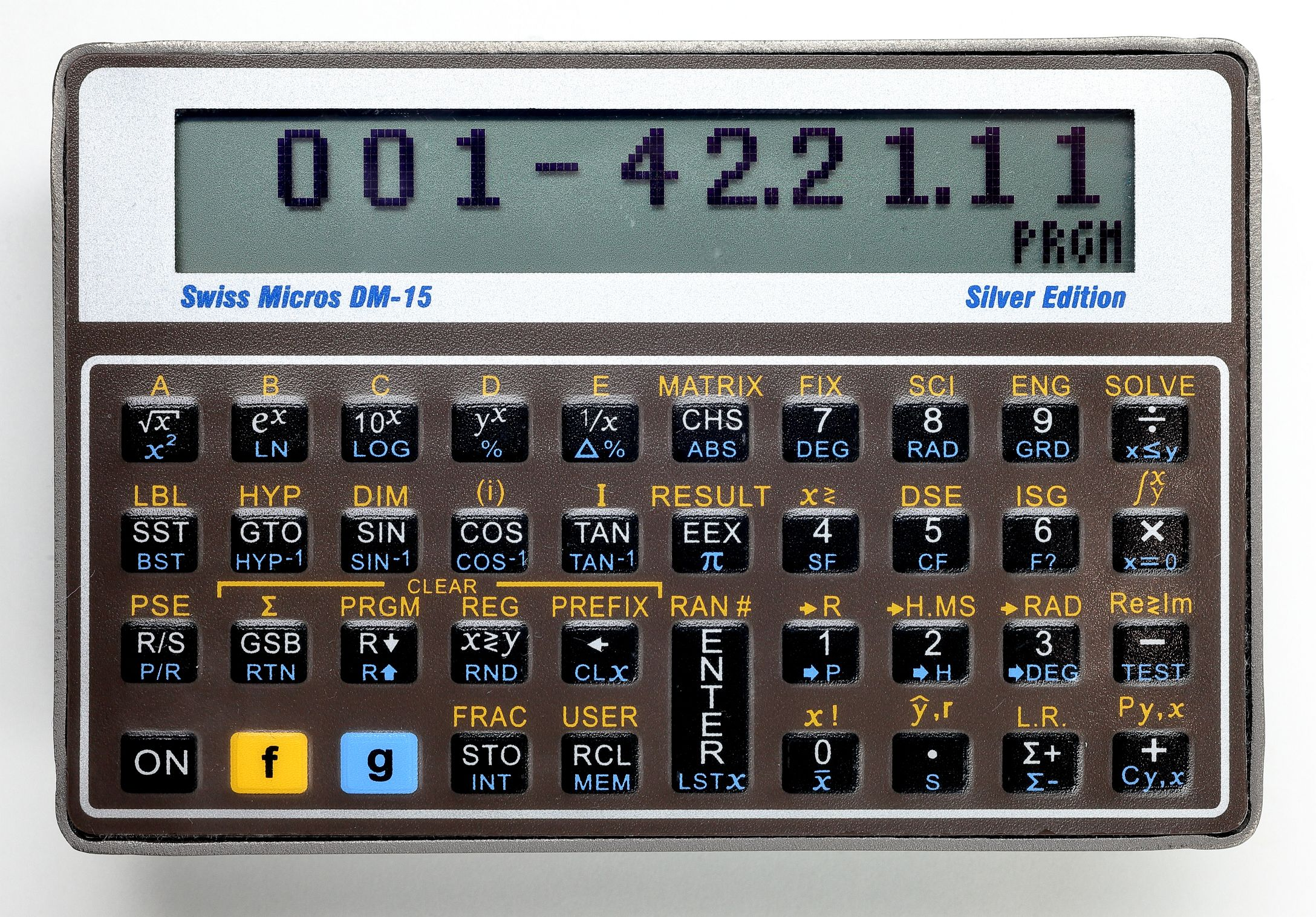
SwissMicros DM-15C (9mm tall), an ID-1 card size version of HP Voyager HP-15C

- Braun's Solar ST1,
- Canon's Solar Card Calculator CA-107, MyCard LS-700B/720B, FlashCard LS-701/701H/715/717H/718H/777, LS-704/704G calculators.
- Citizen's W8,
- "GUCCI" branded two way powered calculator by Aurora Consumer Calculators' (Taiwan),
- KMC's KMC-8000 and KMC-9000D,
- Philips' LDB 8451,
- Sanyo's Amorton Card CX-12/16, Solar Star CX-20,
- Sharp's Sharp Card EL-865/865H/868/876/878S, Foldable Card EL-866 (similar to Cassio SL-500), Fineline WN-20 (angled orientation),
- Systema's (Taiwan) Stonehart EX-2 Solar,
- Texas Instruments' TI-1786 TI Card, TI-35/37 Galaxy Solar (manufactured by Toshiba).

Discontinued by all major manufacturers in 2010s, development of similar calculators continued by merchandise manufacturers and as electronic badge by DIY electronics makers. Modern smallest solar and two way powered basic arithmetic calculators commonly fits to 6-11mm tall ID-1 card size:

- SL-777 Film Card (landscape) successors: SL-787/790L, SL-160, also Sharp EL-869S/879L.
- SL-70 and SL-770 Film Card (portrait) successors: HS-4G, also Citizen SLD-100NR.
- SL-7 Film Card (clamshell) successors: SL-C100, SL-100L and SX-100.

Samsung SGH-P300 (followed by SGH-P310 model with 240×320px color display) was the first full featured camera phone in a size of the 8.9mm tall ID-1 card series, having a built-in arithmetic calculator it also was J2ME MIDP 2.0 enabled feature phone allowing its users to install any advanced software calculator (scientific, programmable or even graphing) as a 3rd party MIDlet.
