= Yewande =

- Gender: Female
- Language: Yoruba

Origin
- Origin: Nigeria
- Meaning: Mother sought me out to this place
- Region of origin: South-west Nigeria

Yewande (Yéwándé) is a Nigerian name of Yoruba origins which means "mother sought me out to this place". Yéwándé is a name given to baby girls born after the loss of a mother or grandmother, usually of one of the parents to the child.

== Notable people with the name ==
- Yewande Adekoya (born 1984), Nigerian actress, filmmaker, director, and producer
- Yewande Akinola (born 1985), Nigerian engineer
- Yewande Komolafe, food writer, author, and recipe developer
- Yewande Omotoso (born 1980), South African-based Nigerian novelist, architect, and designer
- Yewande Akinse Nigerian poet, author and entrepreneur
