= Electromagnetic Field (festival) =

Technology-focused camping festival in the UK

Coordinates: 52.039°N 2.377°W

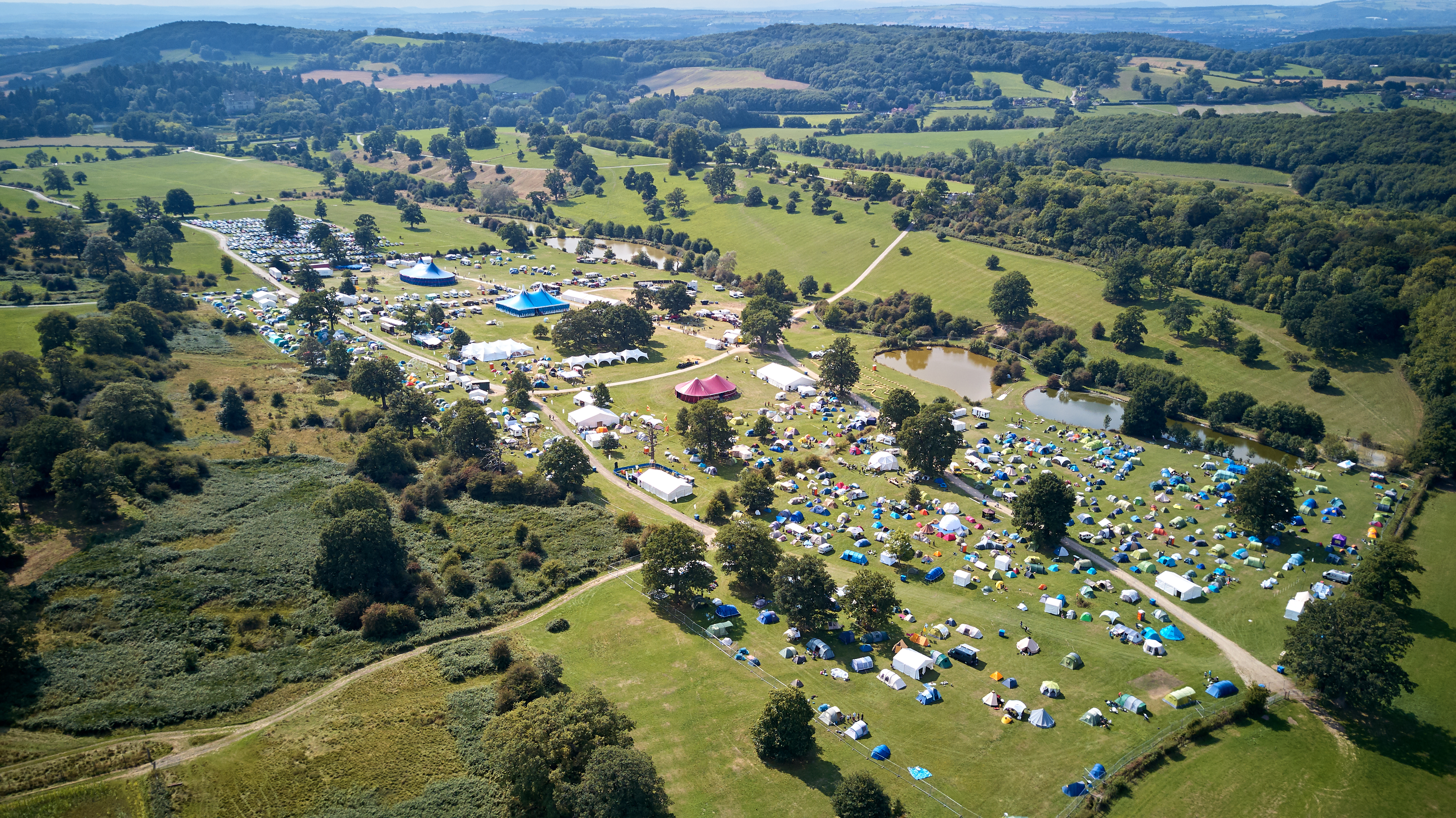
- Overhead view of Electromagnetic Field 2018
- Status: active
- Frequency: Biennially
- Country: England
- Inaugurated: August 2012
- Founder: Jonty Wareing, Russ Garrett
- Most recent: 16 July - 20 July 2026
- Next event: 2028
- Participants: 3500
- Filing status: Not for profit
- Website: emfcamp.org

Electromagnetic Field (also known as EMF, or EMF Camp) is a camping festival in the UK, held every two years, for hackers, geeks, engineers and scientists. It features talks and workshops covering a wide variety of topics. EMF is a non-profit event run entirely by a team of volunteers.

Attendees of EMF receive an electronic conference badge, funded by sponsorship, which in 2014 included an LCD screen, Arduino-compatible microcontroller, and a radio transceiver.

== History ==
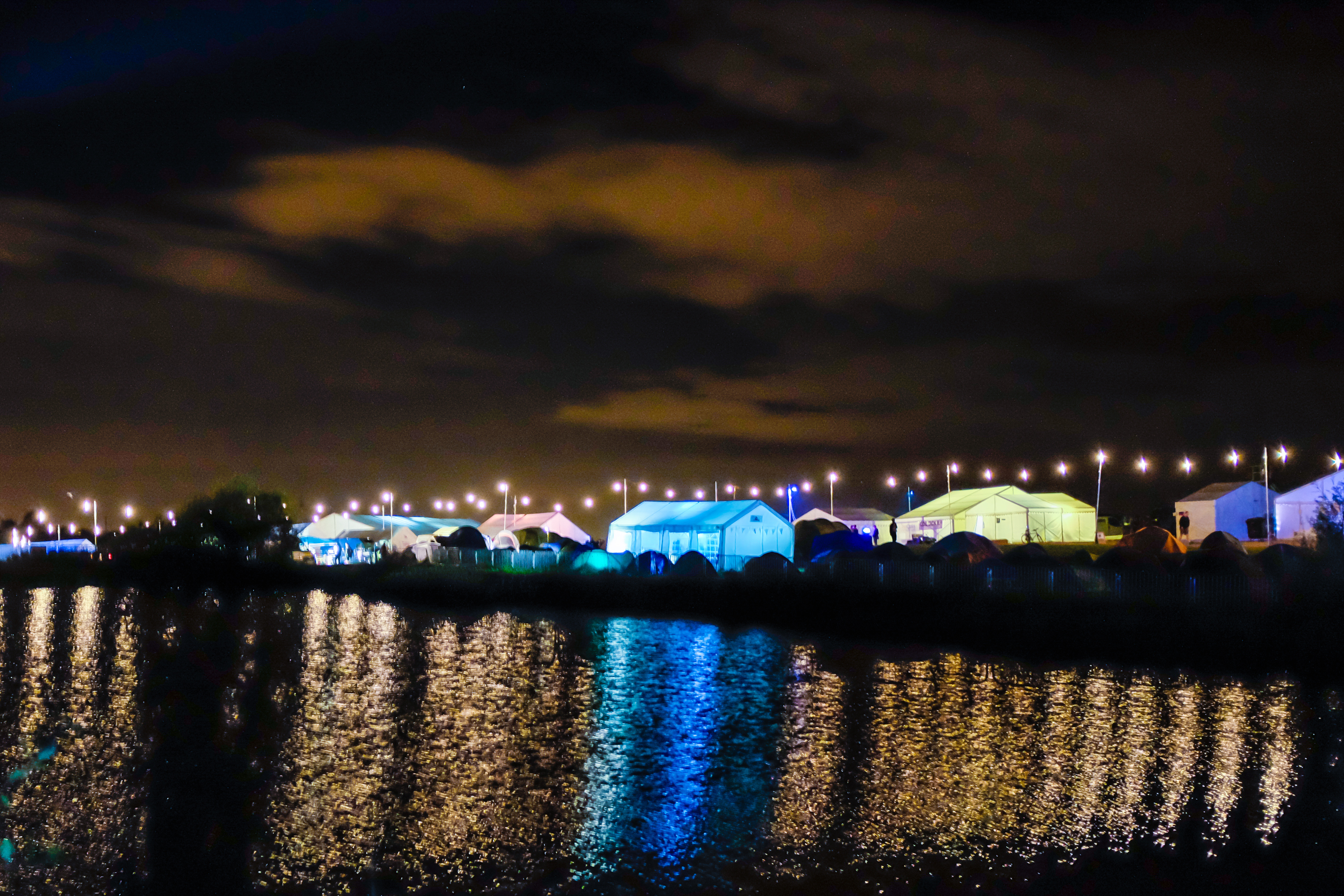
Electromagnetic Field 2014 at Night

The first Electromagnetic Field event was held in 2012 at Pineham in Milton Keynes, and completely sold out a 499-person capacity. Each tent at EMF 2012 was provided with power and, via a 2.5 km direct microwave link to a data centre, internet. The microwave link provided 370 Mbit/s to the campsite. Over 50 speakers gave talks, including Ben Goldacre.

In 2013, a smaller interim one-day event called Electromagnetic Wave was held in London on board the MS Stubnitz.

The main event was held again in 2014 at Hounslow Hall Estate, Newton Longville (near Milton Keynes). Over 1,200 tickets were sold. As with the 2012 event, internet was provided by a direct microwave link which provided 436 Mbit/s. The entire event had over 100 talks, workshops and events with a separate track for children. Notable speakers included Tom Watson MP and Simon Singh. In addition there were 45 'villages' that ran their own workshops and events including silver smithing, wood turning and making stroopwafels.

The 2016 event was held on 5–7 August at Loseley Park, Guildford with an attendance of over 1,600. A 1 Gbit/s internet connection was provided by fibre, and the on-site network had a 10 Gbit/s backbone.

The 2018 Event was held at Eastnor Castle Deer Park in Herefordshire. The 2018 Event debuted the Null Sector Night Club Area run by the fictional Polybuis Corporation.

The 2020 Event was cancelled due to the ongoing COVID-19 pandemic, but the event resumed in 2022.

The 2022 Event featured null sector in an saddle-span style tent as an underwater research facility staged in the north end of the site for the first time.

The 2024 Event had the overall theme of Solar Punk and featured the Null Sector area as an open air night club, complete with lasers and flamethrowers on the dance-floor, the nightclub themed as "Polybuis Extraction Division" as a Quarry featured over 15 installations and a 400 capacity dance-floor, EMF solar punk fabric was made available for purchase after the event, the design was produced by artist Morag Hickman. It was announced during the infrastructure review that EMF owns 40 km of dark fibre from the site to an uplink Internet was provided by a 40Gbit/s fibre connection with 1Gbit/s ports being standard, and 10Gbit/s ports available per request.

The 2026 event had a theme of space. A planetarium was introduced which showed a programme of attendee-artist led content as well as pre-programmed traditional space shows. Notable speakers included Robin Ince, Kate Devlin,Tim Hunkin and Sophie Harker, as well as a set from drum and bass DJ Venjent. The event included over 138 talks, 141 installations, 49 musical acts and 85 workshops. The night club area Null Sector was themed as a spaceport set in the 2090s called "Polybuis GTN 4242" and featured 2 bars, a 800 person capacity dance-floor, over 20 installations and a new algorave and modular synth performance venue called "Trash Compactor" This ran workshops during the day and unscheduled attendee performances in the evening. A Music Stage (Stage D) was also introduced.

The 2028 event was announced in the closing ceremony of the 2026 event to be returning to Eastnor Castle Deer Park.

== List of events ==
No.	Date	Location	Attendance	Internet connection
1st	31 August – 2 September 2012	Pineham Park, Milton Keynes	499	370 Mbit/s (direct microwave link)
2nd	29-31 August 2014	Hounslow Hall Estate, Newton Longville, Milton Keynes	> 1,200	436 Mbit/s (direct microwave link)
3rd	5-7 August 2016	Loseley Park, Guildford	> 1,600	1 Gbit/s (fibre)
4th	31 August – 2 September 2018	Eastnor Castle Deer Park, Herefordshire	2,500	1 Gbit/s (fibre)
	~~24-26 July 2020~~ (cancelled)	~~Eastnor Castle Deer Park, Herefordshire~~		
5th	2-5 June 2022	Eastnor Castle Deer Park, Herefordshire	2,800	1 Gbit/s (fibre)
6th	30 May - 2nd June 2024	Eastnor Castle Deer Park, Herefordshire	3000	40 Gbit/s (fibre)
7th	16 July - 19 July 2026	Eastnor Castle Deer Park, Herefordshire	3500	40 Gbit/s (fibre)
8th	2028	Eastnor Castle Deer Park, Herefordshire	TBC	TBC

== Badges ==
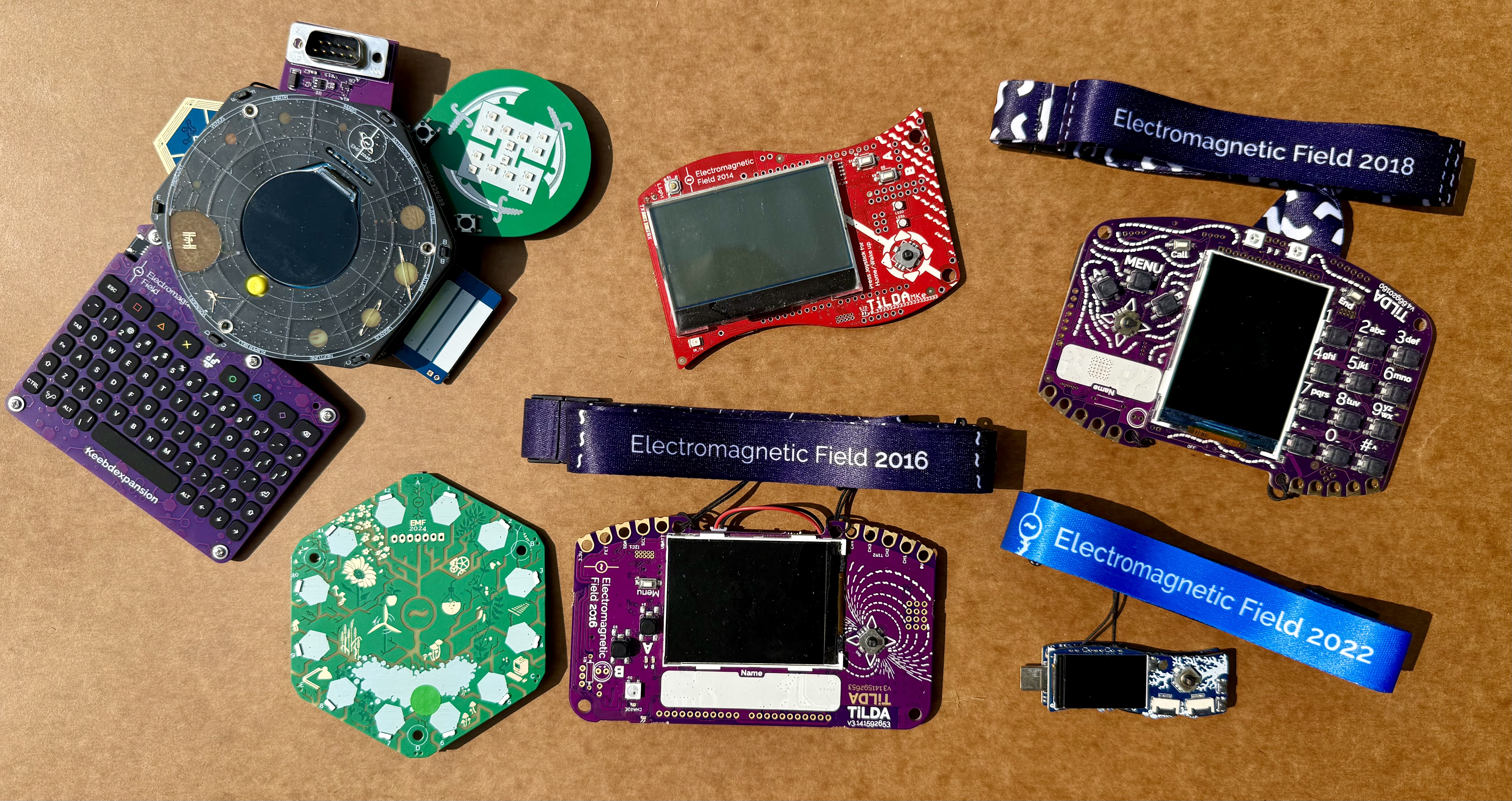
Badges from the 2014, 2016, 2018, 2022, 2024 and 2026 events. The 2026 badge includes the optional 'Keebdeck' keyboard hexpansion and four further hexpansions.

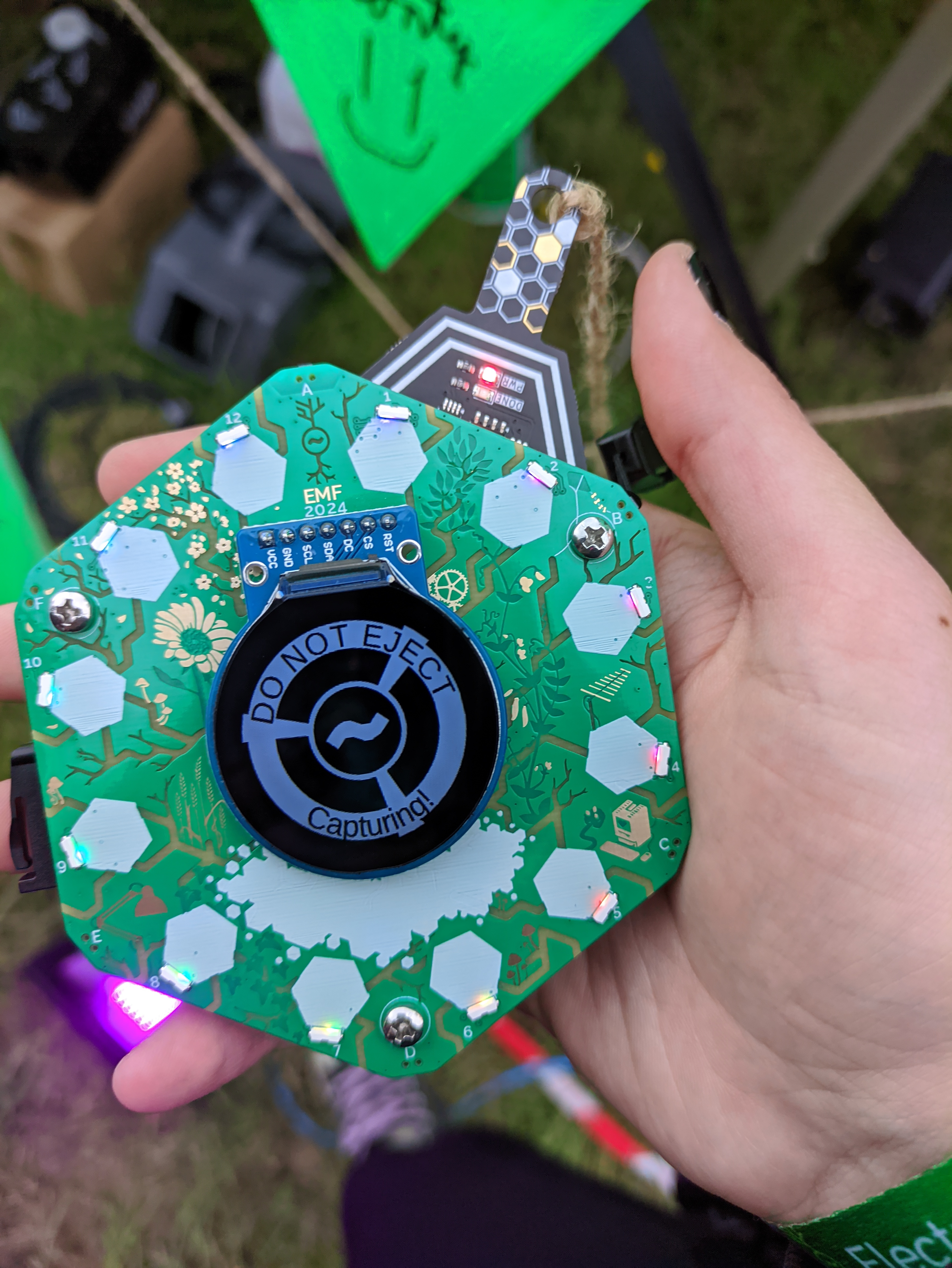
Tildagon badge from the 2024 event, with a hexpansion plugged in on top right

Each event, up to and including the 2024 event had a custom, programmable, battery-powered badge.

For the first event in 2012 the badge was named TiLDA, based on an ATMega 32U4 and was Arduino-compatible.

The 2014 badge (TiLDA MKe) was an Arduino Due-compatible badge. It was the first to come with an LCD, and all subsequent EMF badges included an LCD screen. It included Accelerometer and Gyroscope sensors, along with a long-range wireless transceiver.

The 2016 badge was named TiLDA MK3, and dropped Arduino-compatibility for sake of Micropython. It was built around the STM32L4 microcontroller, and included a WiFi module, gyroscope and magnetometer.

The 2018 badge (TiLDA MK4) included a SIM800 GSM module and T9 number keypad.

The 2022 badge was renamed to TiDAL. It was a badge in a USB-C thumbdrive format, with an LCD screen, a joystick, and various buttons.

For 2024, the event debuted the Tildagon badge, planned to be used for all future events alongside hardware "hexpansion" boards. The Tildagon badge is based on an Espressif ESP32-S3 with 2MB of RAM and 8MB of storage.

The 2026 badge, known as Spaceagon, featured a re-used 2024 backboard and screen along with a new frontboard and middleboard. These boards included a joystick, compass and touch-sensitive areas. An optional keyboard hexpansion known as 'Keebdeck' was also available.

== Synchronization with other events ==
In the years when Electromagnetic Field does not occur, Chaos Communication Camp (in Germany) and one of the Hack-Tic hacker events (in the Netherlands) occur alternately.
