= Casio VL-1 =

Electronic instrument

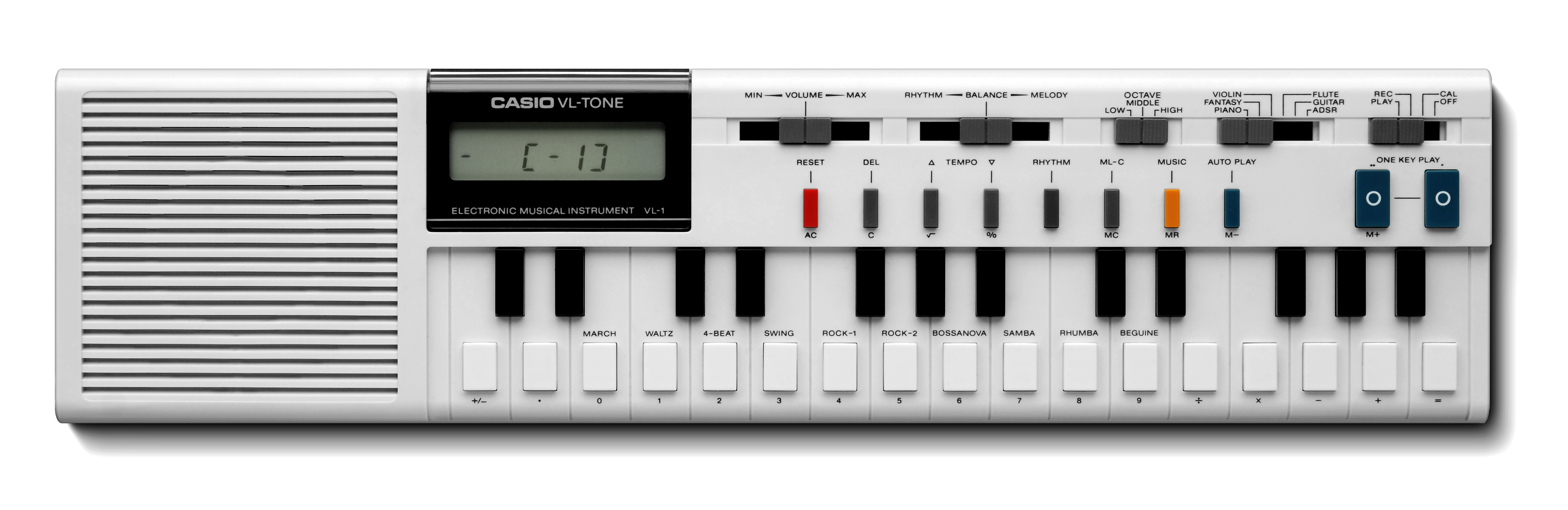
Casio VL-Tone VL-1

The VL-1 was the first instrument of Casio's VL-Tone product line, and is sometimes referred to as the VL-Tone. It combined a calculator, a monophonic synthesizer, and sequencer. Released in 1981, it was the first affordable commercial digital synthesizer, selling for $69.95.

RadioShack sold a rebranded version of the VL-1 called the Realistic Concertmate 200.

== Keyboard ==
The VL-1 has electronic keyboard with 29 buttons, including 23 buttons of the basic calculator, were 17 used for notes input (G to B notes) marked from the left with "Plus-minus" sign, and all rest the basic arithmetic calculator buttons placed on the right with "Equal sign" placed as right most:

| ± | . | 0 | 1 | 2 | 3 | 4 | 5 | 6 | 8 | 9 | 0 | + | × | - | ÷ | = |

It also has a three-position octave switch, one programmable and five preset sounds, ten built-in rhythm patterns, an eight-character LCD, a 100-note sequencer, and a multi-function calculator mode. The VL-1 is notable for its kitsch value among electronic musicians, due to its cheap construction and its unrealistic, uniquely low-fidelity sounds. It was followed by the VL-10, a very similar machine in a smaller unit, the VL-80, a pocket calculator size version, and the VL-5, a polyphonic version, capable of playing four notes simultaneously, but lacking the VL-1's synthesizer section due to the removal of the calculator mode.

=== Melody-80 calculators ===
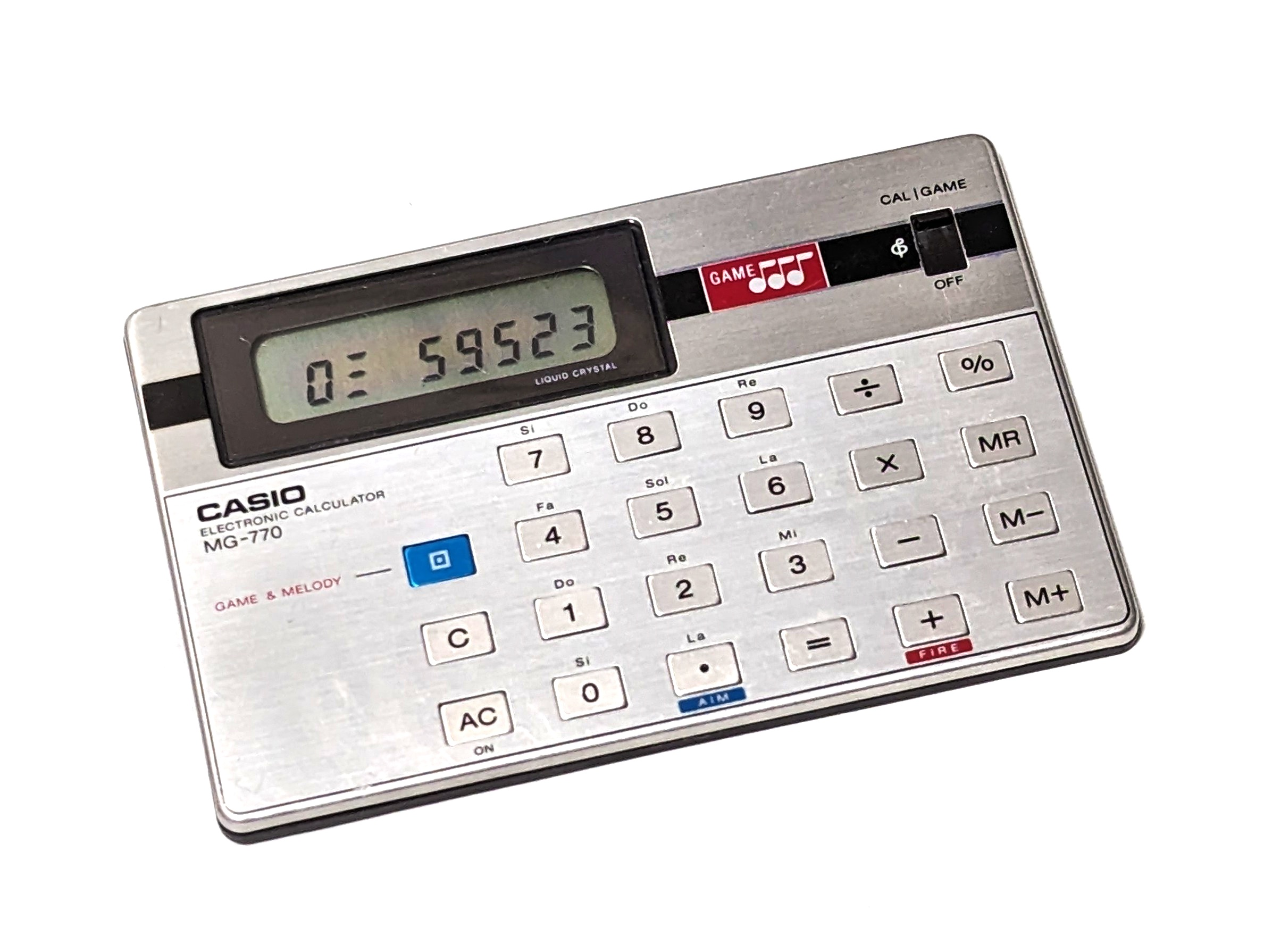
Casio MG-770 Game & Melody Card

The ML-720 Melody Card of the Casio Mini Card calculators introduced along with the ML (Melody), MG (Game & Melody), UC (Universal Calendar) and L (Lady) series of calculators had 11-notes synthesizer, utilized only digit input buttons and operation buttons as controls, where music notes were inscribed above the buttons without noting the octave order.

| La/. | Si/0 | Do/1 | Re/2 | Mi/3 | Fa/4 | Sol/5 | La/6 | Si/7 | Do/8 | Re/9 |

This made it difficult to distinguish lower and upper octave notes by its Solfège inscribed names.

=== VL-80 calculator ===
The VL-80 is a pocket portrait oriented calculator introduced with 16-notes synthezier keypad in 4×4 layout. Comparing to VL-1, VL-80's layout missed one highest tone note moving "Equal sign" button from the right end to the left end and rearranged from arithmetic operations buttons.

| (Sol ^{_5})/= | (La ^{_6})/. | (Si ^{_7})/0 | Do^{1}/1 | Re^{2}/2 | (Mi ^{3})/3 | (Fa ^{4})/4 | (Sol ^{5})/5 | (La ^{6})/6 | (Si ^{7})/7 | (Do ^{‾1})/8 | (Re ^{‾2})/9 | (Mi ^{‾3})/÷ | (Fa ^{‾4})/× | (Sol ^{‾5})/(-) | (La ^{‾6})/(+) |

Comparing to Melody-80, VL-80's keyboard inscribed notes by its name additionally followed by its order number in octave prefixed with underscore sign for low octave notes and uppersocore sign for high octave notes.

== Sound ==
Casio VL-1 music sample

Its sounds were mostly composed of filtered squarewaves with varied pulse-widths. Its piano, violin, flute and guitar timbres were nearly unrecognizable abstractions of real instruments. It also featured a "fantasy" voice, and a programmable synthesizer which provided for choice of both oscillator waveform and ADSR envelope. It had a range of two and a half octaves.

== Features ==
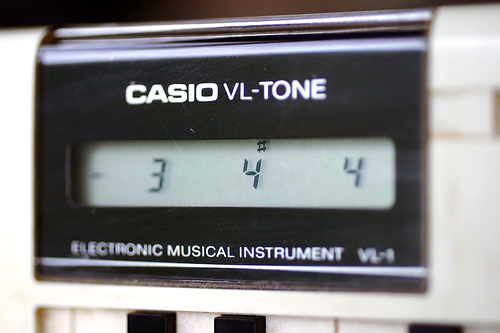
The LCD

The VL-1 featured a small LCD capable of displaying 8 characters. This was primarily used for the calculator function, but also displayed notes played. The VL-1 also had changeable tone and balance, basic tempo settings and a real-time monophonic music sequencer, which could play back up to 99 notes. There were also 10 pre-loaded rhythms which utilized just three basic drum sounds. Casio internally named these sounds "Po" (30ms), "Pi" (20ms) and "Sha" (160ms).

== Voices ==
Piano, Fantasy, Violin, Flute, Guitar, Guitar(II), English Horn, and Electro sound (I, II and III) are available in ADSR Mode. Piano, Fantasy, Violin, Flute and Guitar (I) have direct access, and Guitar (II), English Horn, Electro sound (I, II and III) only can be used with ADSR button.

The sounds (*) do not have direct access through a button, but they are part of the ADSR variables, so there are 5 more sounds in reality, although they can only be used through the synthesizer and must be entered through a code. So it would look like this: Piano, Fantasy, Violin, Flute, Guitar (I) are available at the same time, and any of the mentioned sounds or Guitar (II), English Horn, Electronic sound (I), (II) and ( III) can only be obtained by means of a code and occupy one at a time on the ADSR button.

== ADSR ==
The VL-1 was programmed by entering a number into the calculator section's memory, then switching back to keyboard mode.

It worked like this (the number is the value for each):

Example (90099914)

- 9 Waveform
- 0 Attack
- 0 Decay
- 9 Sustain level
- 9 Sustain time
- 9 Release time
- 1 Vibrato
- 4 Tremolo

== Notable uses and appearances ==
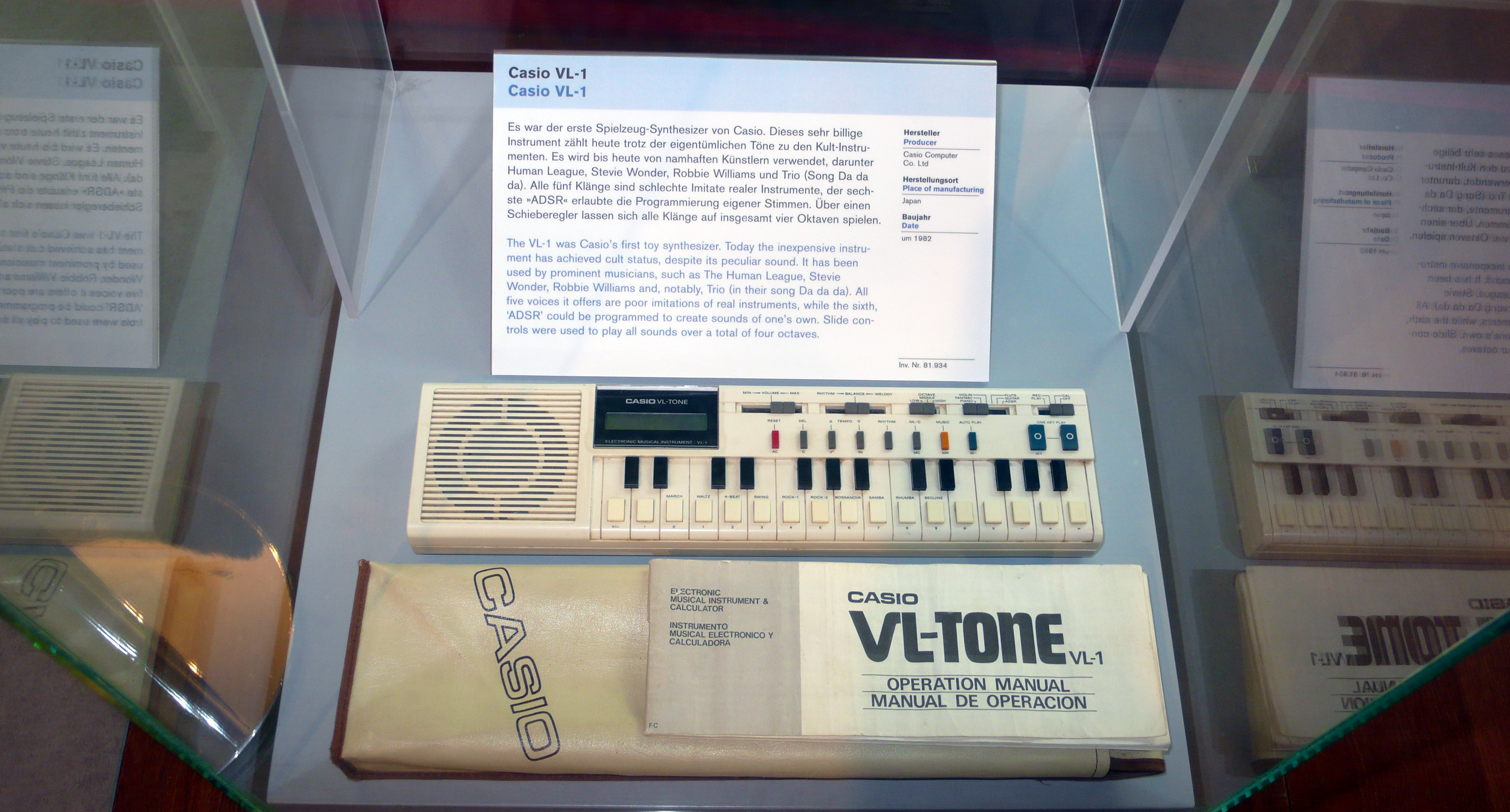
Vienna Technical Museum / VL-1 Inv. Nr 81934

- The VL-1 acquired enduring notability in 1982, when the German band Trio used it in one of their songs, the "faux-Kraftwerk tune", "Da Da Da". They used the Rock-1 rhythm preset and the Piano voice.
- The VL-1's "Rock-2" drum sound is used in the song "Hanging Around" (original by The Stranglers) by Hazel O'Connor on her album Cover Plus.
- The Human League used the preset-sound called "Fantasy" of the VL-1 for "Get Carter", a song on their album Dare.
- Jimmy Spicer used 1882 the "Rock-2"-rythm for "The Bubble Bunch".
- In 1995, "parsimonious" French singer/songwriter Dominique A used a minimum of instruments, including the VL-1 (called the "VL Tone" in the French press).
- The 2007 single "Clumsy" by Fergie used one of the default electronic beeps from the VL-1 for its melody.

== See also ==
- Casiotone
