= Myles Edwards =

English rugby union player

- Born: Myles Edwards; 19 May 1997 (age 29) Handsworth, West Midlands, England
- Height: 1.99 m (6 ft 6 in)
- Weight: 124 kg (19 st 7 lb)
- School: Fairfax Academy; Worcester Sixth Form College

Rugby union career
- Position: Lock
Senior career
Years	Team	Apps	(Points)
2015–2016	Worcester Warriors	0	(0)
2016–2017	La Rochelle	0	(0)
2017–2018	Aurillac	20	(0)
2018–2020	Oyonnax	30	(5)
2020	Wasps	0	(0)
2020–2021	Toshiba Brave Lupus	0	(0)
- Correct as of 24 September 2020
International career
Years	Team	Apps	(Points)
- England Counties
- Correct as of 24 September 2020

Myles Edwards (born 19 May 1997) is an English rugby union player who plays for Toshiba Brave Lupus in the Top League.

A late starter, he began playing rugby at the age of sixteen. He joined the Worcester Warriors AASE development programme, combining rugby with studying at Worcester Sixth Form College.

After a year at Sixways, he moved to France with Top 14 side La Rochelle, where he spent during the 2016-17 season. That was followed by a season with Pro D2 outfit Aurillac for the 2017-18 season. On 31 May 2018, Edwards left to join Pro D2 rivals Oyonnax on a two-year deal from the 2018-19 season.

On 19 May 2020, Edwards returns to England to join Wasps in the Premiership Rugby from the 2020-21 season. However, Edwards left Wasps to sign for Japanese side Toshiba Brave Lupus in the Top League competition.
