= Shrouk El-Attar =

Egyptian LGBTQI activist and design engineer

- Born: 1991 or 1992 (age 33–34); Alexandria, Egypt
- Citizenship: Egypt
- Education: Cathays High School; Cardiff University
- Occupations: Engineer, belly dancer, LGBT rights activist

Shrouk El-Attar (Arabic: شروق العطار) is an electronics engineering consultant and a PCB design expert who was born in Egypt and has been living in the United Kingdom as a refugee since 2007. She is an activist for refugee rights in the UK, and for LGBT rights in her native Egypt.

El-Attar performs as a belly dancer in an act called "Dancing Queer", to raise funds for legal defense fees for LGBT people in Egypt, and to help with relocation for those persecuted and at risk because of their gender or sexuality.

El-Attar was one of the women chosen by the BBC in 2018 as one of the 100 Most Influential Women in the World, and was selected by the Institution of Engineering and Technology as a 2021 Young Woman Engineer of the Year. In 2024, she was recognized as one of the Top 5 Electronics Engineering Entrepreneurs in the UK by Electronics Weekly magazine and one of the Top 24 British Role Models in Science, Technology, Mathematics, and Engineering (STEM).

== Childhood and refugee status ==
Shrouk El-Attar grew up in Alexandria, Egypt. She realized her sexual interest in women at a young age, but was put off by people in her immediate surroundings, such as teachers, who told her that homosexuality was a "terrible sin".

El-Attar arrived in the UK in 2007, at the age of 15, together with her mother and siblings. However, their asylum claim was rejected, and they were deported during an immigration dawn raid on her family home while she was staying at a friend's house. El-Attar was eventually granted asylum because of her LGBT status. She describes the process she went through as difficult and even humiliating: "I had to produce evidence about sexual intercourse. Not the nicest thing, having to call up your exes and ask them to write about the time they had sex with you. And, you know, it's really graphic detail. I think that a lot of LGBT+ refugees have had similar experiences, of feeling really humiliated, and dehumanized." El-Attar states that she was lucky because she had already been living in the UK for a while before going through the process, but that other refugees who might be escaping death or incarceration, would not necessarily have the same access to correspondence and communication in order to fulfill this type of requirement.

El-Attar identifies as Queer, an umbrella term covering a multitude of sexual and gender minorities. She has expressed her conviction that she would not be alive were she to try and live her life openly in Egypt, as she does in the UK, referring to forced marriage and other types of violence perpetrated upon LGBT people in her homeland.

== Activism ==
In 2018, El-Attar joined other refugee rights campaigners to address the British parliament, and tell about their experiences. One of El-Attar's primary issues on behalf of refugees is access to education.

In Egypt, during her early teens, El-Attar was two years ahead of her classmates and was set to start university at 16. But her arrival in Britain changed all that. Although as of 2018 El-Attar was studying for her master's degree in engineering at Cardiff University, she herself was denied the chance to study at university during the years she was applying for asylum, according to nationwide university policy, which treated asylum seekers as international students, subject to vastly higher fees, while at the same time forbidding them to work. This effectively barred her and other of the most vulnerable prospective students. Moreover, this was in spite of the fact that she was accepted into every university she applied to.

While she was waiting for her opportunity to achieve her higher education, El-Attar joined the activist group STAR - Student Action for Refugees, and campaigned for asylum seekers to be treated as British students within the educational system. There are now more than 60 universities in the UK accepting asylum seekers as students and she is now sits on the board of trustees for the charity STAR - Student Action for Refugees with over 30,000 volunteers across the UK.

In March 2018, Shrouk was awarded Young Woman of the Year 2018 by the United Nations refugee agency UNHCR, for her work on behalf of refugee rights in the UK.

=== Dancing Queer ===
El-Attar describes the freedom she found to be queer as a liberating and life-changing experience. But not one that was all good - two years after arriving in the UK, at 17, her family found out about her queer identity, and their relationships fell apart. Though forced to leave home at a young age and to go through a separate and invasive asylum process, El-Attar recognized her own privilege as compared to her "LGBTQ+ siblings" back in Egypt, and was determined to continue and fight for their rights as well.

She began dancing at charity and political events as the belly dancing "Dancing Queer", a beard-wearing drag persona who embodies her political statements about body hair, beauty standards, gender expression, sexuality and more. She raises money for legal fees and relocation expenses for persecuted Egyptian queers, and works to raise awareness to their plight.

Her most recent of three speeches to parliament, as well as the UNHCR and her inclusion in the BBC 100 list, came on the heels of a major crackdown on LGBT people in Egypt. Though homosexuality is not technically illegal in Egypt, the social and governmental approaches to homosexuality are extremely negative. Towards the end of 2017, during the Mashrou' Leila rainbow concert, members of the audience were arrested for unfurling a rainbow flag in support of LGBT rights. One man has been sentenced to six years in jail for 'practicing debauchery' on his way home from the concert. After this incident, Egypt's Supreme Council for Media Regulation decided to ban 'all forms of promotion or sympathy towards the LGBT community on media outlets, on account of it being a 'shameful disease'. Unless an LGBTQ+ individual is going live to 'show repentance and remorse over their sexuality,' they're not to be portrayed in a positive light. In addition, Egypt has been considering a new law to ban homosexuality, which is likely to escalate the situation for LGBTQ Egyptians.

El-Attar has taken her performance all over the UK, as well as internationally, to places such as France, the Netherlands and Japan.

== Engineering career and STEM outreach ==
El-Attar is an electronics engineering consultant and PCB design expert. She completed her bachelor's and master's degrees in engineering at Cardiff University. Previously, she worked as a system design engineer in Cardiff, an assistant lecturer of engineering, an interpreter, a museum guide, and as a theatre and radio actor, in such productions as Stori, A telling, at the Welsh Millennium Centre, Nothing is Out of Place on Radio Cardiff, and Praxis Makes Perfect (Interactive Theatre) at the National Theatre of Wales.

She credits her interest in Electronic Engineering to one of her earliest memories realising that people on TV were not small sized humans living inside it; making her think that electronics were a form of magic. Now working at Renishaw, she designs electronic circuits for encoders that can provide measurements in nanometers, and for industrial robotic Coordinate Measuring Machines (CMM).

She previously worked with surgeons operating on the eye and undertook engineering placements at microprocessor manufacturer, Intel, and with Fujitsu in Kawasaki, Japan, where she presented about her role in developing Optical Network Communication products in the Japanese language. She subsequently became the Electronic Engineering Industry Mentor at Cardiff University, where she studied.

For her master's research in Electron Paramagnetic Resonance (EPR), she created new methods utilising microwaves to identify organic material based on electron quantum spin, including some cancers. During her BEng, Shrouk spoke on the BBC about developing IoT Hydroponic systems for the Welsh start-up, Phytoponics. Upon graduation, Cardiff University chose to write its alumni issue about her out of over 100,000 alumni.

El-Attar expressed that as a teenager, not being allowed to study engineering at university due to being an asylum seeker strongly impacted her mental health - and that despite this, she became a STEM Ambassador in 2011. Her most recent STEM outreach activity is teaching mathematics to refugee children.

In 2021, El-Attar won the Institution of Engineering and Technology Women's Engineering Society (WES) Prize. The WES award is presented to "an engineer who is committed to inspiring the next generation of diverse and passionate STEM pioneers".

== Awards and recognition ==
- Institution of Engineering and Technology local PATW 2015
- Da Vinci Innovation Award for Engineering 2016
- BBC's 100 Women, 2018
- UNHCR Young Woman of the Year 2018
- Institution of Engineering and Technology top 6 Young Women Engineers in the UK 2019
- Young Woman Engineer of the Year Awards - WES Prize Winner 2020
- Engineering Bright Spark Award by RS Components 2022
- The Institution of Mechanical Engineers's Verena Holmes Award 2022
- Top 24 Role Models in Science, Technology, Engineering, and Mathematics by the Association for Black and Ethnic Minority Engineers 2024
- Top 5 Electronics Engineering Entrepreneurs in the UK by Electronics Weekly Magazine 2024
