= Mamta Singhal =

- Born: Massachusetts, US
- Education: University of Glasgow (BEng); University of Strathclyde (MSc, MBA)
- Occupation: Design engineer
- Known for: Campaigner for diversity in engineering

Mamta Singhal MBE CEng FIET FWES is a design engineer and campaigner on diversity, connections in engineering. In 2022 she was awarded an MBE for services to engineering. In 2007, she was awarded the Women's Engineering Society Prize for engaging and inspiring young people's interest in STEM.

== Early life and education ==
Singhal was born in Massachusetts and grew up in South Lanarkshire, Scotland.

== Career ==
Singhal joined Dyson on a graduate engineering program in 2003 and later moved to Hasbro as a Global Design Engineer from 2003–2006. She spent four years working on international projects for Hasbro including Playdoh, Monopoly and Action Man. She joined Mars as a Senior Scientist and Project Packaging Manager in 2009, working on brands such as Galaxy, Twix, Bounty and M&Ms. Between 2011 and 2013, Singhal worked as a Senior Innovation Executive at Scottish Enterprise, before joining Mattel as a Project Quality Engineer in 2013, working on the Barbie brand. Singhal worked as Commercialisation Manager at Coca-Cola European Partners from 2017-2021 and worked for Diageo, in senior leadership R&D/Operations at Charlotte Tilbury Beauty, and is currently working as a Principal Engineer.

Singhal is a regular speaker on diversity in engineering and encouraging young people consider STEM careers and had a range of speaking agents. She has featured on BBC Breakfast, ITV news, national and regional radio talking about this topic. Was the keynote speaker at 2025 at Scottish Engineering Awards (Scottish Engineering Awards Dinner 2025 | Scottish Engineering). In 2016 and 2019 she was a speaker and mentor at Management Today's Inspiring Woman in Business Conference for STEM and in 2018 she chaired the panel for the IET Young Woman Engineer of the Year awards. She also appeared in the IET's 'Portrait of an Engineer' campaign in 2017.

In 2020 Singhal became an engineering visiting professor at Middlesex University and was elected as a Fellow of the Women's Engineering Society. She was elected to the Board of the Women's Engineering Society in October 2021.

Singhal was appointed as a member of the Institution of Engineering and Technology's Council for 2019–2022 and was awarded Fellowship of the IET in October 2021. She was elected as a member of the IET's Board of Trustees for 2023-2026. and was elected at Global Vice President for the IET in 2026

She was appointed as a Member of the Order of the British Empire in the 2022 New Year's Honours List for services to engineering. She is also an ambassador for Dyslexia Scotland.

== Awards ==
- 2022: Member of the British Empire, New Years' Honours
- 2021: Fellowship of the Institution of Engineering and Technology
- 2020: Fellowship of the Women's Engineering Society
- 2020: Visiting Professorship at Middlesex University
- 2015: BDO's British Indian Awards Best in Science & Engineering
- 2015: ToyNews Women of the Year (finalist)
- 2014: UK Women of the Future – Professional, contribution to engineering (finalist)
- 2008: AMBA MBA Student of the Year (finalist)
- 2008: UK Woman of the Future – Woman in Science and Technology (finalist)
- 2007: WES Prize
- 2007: Supernova – Greenest New Product Idea Winner
