= Katy Deacon =

British engineer and accessibility advocate

Katy Deacon BEng MEng CEng FIET
- Education: UHI Perth (HND); City University, London (BEng); Loughborough University (Masters)
- Occupation: Managing director
- Known for: Leading the Change in Engineering and Inclusion
- Awards: Awards and Recognition
- Website: towardsbelonging.co.uk

Katy Deacon is a British engineer and accessibility advocate. She specialises in inclusive engineering design and is the founder and Managing Director of Towards Belonging Ltd,. Deacon is a Fellow of the Institution of Engineering and Technology (IET) and serves as the organisation's Vice President and trustee. She has received numerous awards for her work in engineering and inclusivity, including the Disability Personality of the Year award in 2025.

== Early life and education ==
After completing her A-levels at Greenhead College, Deacon joined the British Airways Professional Engineering Programme as an avionics graduate apprentice. She gained an HND in Aeronautical Engineering at Perth College and a BEng (hons) degree in Transport Engineering at City University, London.

She later earned an MSc in Renewable Energy, Low Carbon Buildings, and Electrical Building Services Design from Loughborough University while working in the building services industry. During her studies, she developed an award-winning toolkit for architects and engineers to design buildings with renewable energy systems. She also completed a postgraduate degree in Information Governance and Assurance from Aberystwyth University.

== Career ==
After completing her degree and apprenticeship with British Airways, Deacon transitioned to the building services sector due to difficulties in the aviation industry. She worked briefly as a technical support engineer at Daletech Electronics before joining Kirklees Council, where she progressed through various engineering roles. At Kirklees, she specialised in energy conservation, low carbon building design, and renewable energy implementation for educational institutions. Her later position at the council was as Information Governance Manager & Data Protection Officer.

She has since established her own business, Towards Belonging Ltd, where she serves as Managing Director. The company connects the disabled community with the engineering industry and promotes inclusive engineering design principles.

In 2024, Deacon was appointed as a Royal Academy of Engineering Visiting Professor at both the University of Aston and the University of Huddersfield, specialising in Inclusive Engineering Design. At Huddersfield's School of Computing and Engineering, she contributes to curriculum development with a focus on inclusive design principles. Her academic work incorporates perspectives gained from her experience as a wheelchair user.

== Awards and recognition ==
Deacon has received several prestigious awards throughout her career:

- IIE Mary George Memorial Prize for outstanding UK engineering apprentice (2004)
- IET Young Woman Engineer of the Year award (2006)
- NICEIC Energy Efficiency Product of the Year award for the Renewable Energy Toolkit (2006)
- Women's Engineering Society Karen Burt Award for most outstanding newly Chartered Woman Engineer of the Year (2009)
- Shaw Trust Disability Power 100 (2024), recognising her work as a disability changemaker and advocate for inclusive engineering design
- Disability Personality of the Year at the Empowerment Awards (2025)

== Personal life ==
In 2012, Deacon was diagnosed with Multiple sclerosis (MS) and is a wheelchair user. She is married and has two children.
