= Larissa Suzuki =

Brazilian-Italian-British computer scientist

Larissa (Lara) Suzuki
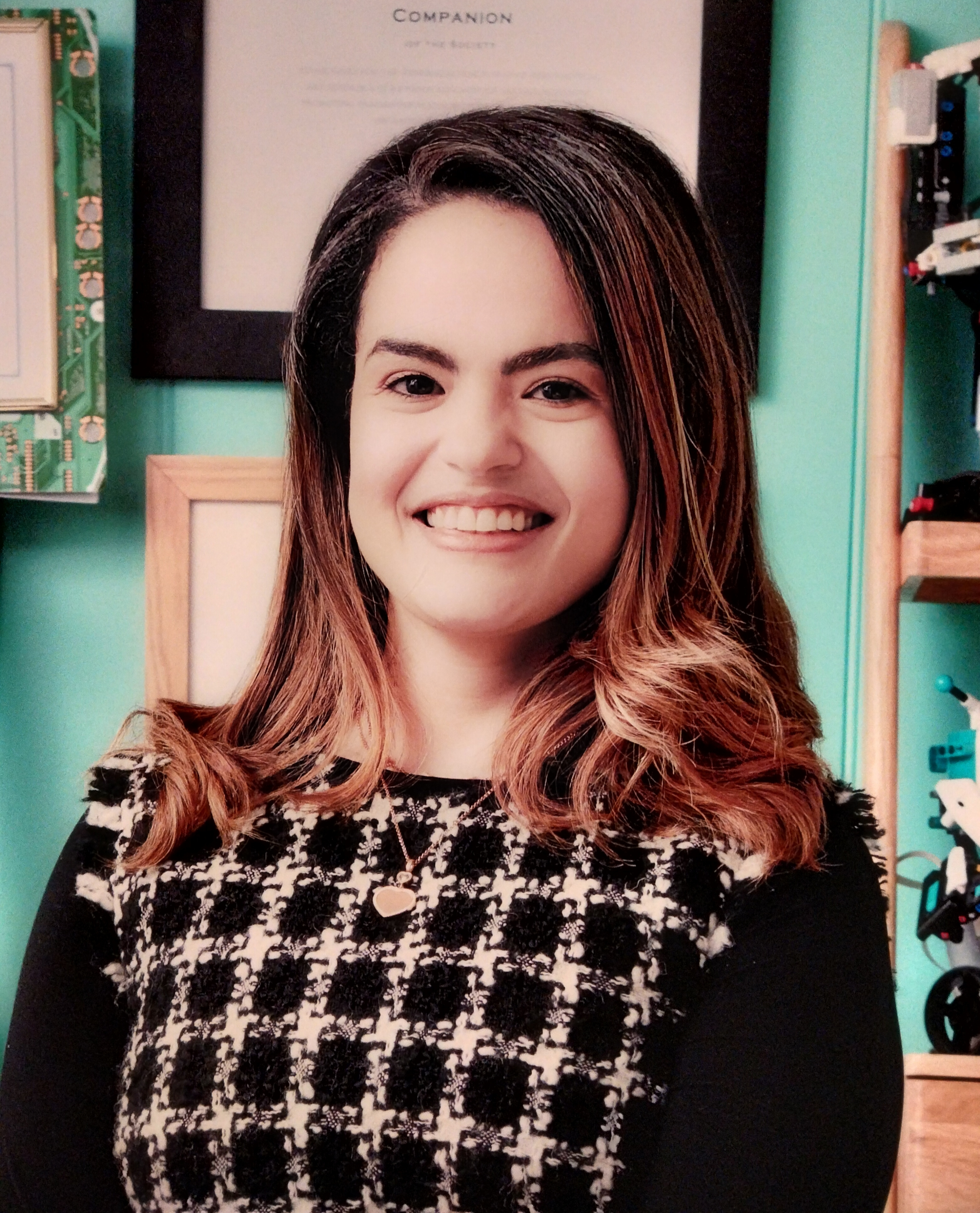
- Born: Ribeirão Preto, São Paulo, Brazil
- Education: University College London (PhD)
- Known for: Smart Cities, AI, Interplanetary Internet, Federated Learning, Neurodiversity
- Awards: Engineer of the Year – UK (2021); Royal Academy of Engineering Rooke Award (2021); WES Young Woman Engineer of the Year (2017); Intel Doctoral Student Honour Award (2013–2014); Google Anita Borg Scholarship (2012)
- Scientific career
- Fields: Smart Cities; Interplanetary Internet; Federated Computing; AI; IoT
- Workplaces: University College London; Google; Jet Propulsion Laboratory (JPL); Imperial College; Massachusetts Institute of Technology
- Thesis: Data as Infrastructure for Smart Cities (2015)
- Doctoral advisor: Anthony Finkelstein
- Website: larissasuzuki.com

Larissa Suzuki, also known as Lara Suzuki, is a Brazilian-Italian-British University Professor, computer scientist, former CEO, Government Advisor, chartered engineer, inventor, scientist, author and entrepreneur. She is also a pianist and violinist. Dr Suzuki is portrayed in the “Engineers Gallery” of The Science Museum in London as one of the women in the UK behind technological innovations.

Suzuki works at Google as a Technical Director in the Google's Office of the CTO working on the field of Artificial Intelligence. She is a Visiting Researcher at NASA Jet Propulsion Laboratory working on building the Interplanetary Internet working with Vint Cerf. Her continuing academic work is as a professor at University College London.

== Early life and education ==
Suzuki grew up in Ribeirão Preto, São Paulo to a family of engineers, scientists and academics. At the age of 15 she went to the Universidade de Ribeirão Preto to pursue a career in music. After one year of studies she dropped from the course and went on pursuing a degree in Computer Science. Suzuki was honoured by the Brazilian Computer Society as the best student of her class. Suzuki started a MPhil degree in Electrical Engineering at the Universidade de São Paulo in the city of Sao Carlos. Her MPhil thesis created new technologies for early detection of breast cancer in women of all ages, and have paved the way to technologies reducing radiation exposure in cancer patients by 20% – 30%. In 2015, Suzuki earned a PhD in Computer Science from University College London in a joint program with Imperial College Business School and the Massachusetts Institute of Technology for her research on smart cities supervised by Anthony Finkelstein.

== Career ==
Suzuki is based at Google working as a member of the Office of the CTO, is also a Google AI Principles Ethics Fellow, and is a Visiting Researcher at Nasa Jet Propulsion Laboratory. She was part of the team who made the historical feat connecting clouds with Delay-tolerant networking. Her continuing academic work is at UCL where she serves as an Honorary Associate Professor in Computer Science. She was previously the UK Head of AI, Analytics and Data Management for Google, was a Director of Product Management at Oracle, and held appointments at Arup Group, City Hall, London, IBM.

Suzuki's PhD thesis pioneered Data Infrastructures for Smart Cities, and she created the City Data Market Strategy of the Mayor of London, and served as a framework for the design Urban Platforms for EU Smart cities.

In 2012 Suzuki founded the UCL Society of Women Engineers and co-founded the Anita Borg Institute London Branch. She chaired the Tech London Advocates group on Smart Cities, and is a reviewer of grant/awards of the Royal Academy of Engineering, the Institution of Engineering and Technology, and served as a judge of the Association for Computing Machinery Global Student Research Competition. She currently serves as a DEI Committee Member of the Royal Academy of Engineering, was a Council Member of the Queen Elizabeth Prize for Engineering Ambassadors, and a Member of the Search Committee of the QEPrize for Engineering.

== Honours and awards ==
Suzuki is an EUR ING, a Fellow of the Institute of Engineering and Technology, and is a Companion (Fellow level) of the Royal Aeronautical Society. In 2022 she was elected the Top 50 Women in European Tech, has been featured in the Financial Times, and was the Woman of the Year by the Women in IT Awards. In 2021, she received the Engineer of the Year Award from "Engineering Talent Awards", in partnership with the Royal Academy of Engineering and sponsored by McLaren Racing. Her contributions to science and engineering has also been included in the Institute of Engineering and Technology "95 inspiring engineers and technologist of the past, present, and future".

She also received the "Rooke Award 2021" from the Royal Academy of Engineering for her work promoting engineering, and for developing the Interplanetary Internet and smart cities. In the same year she also received the Inspiring Fifty UK award and was featured in the Financial Times. She holds the Freedom of the City of London and is a Liveryman at the Worshipful Company of Engineers. In 2012 she was awarded the Google Anita Borg Scholarship (now known as Women Techmakers Scholarship). Other notable awards include Winner of Twenty in Data 2020, the WES Young Woman Engineer of the Year Awards 2017 (Women's Engineering Society), Recipient of the Romberg Grant (Heidelberg Laureate Foundation), 100 Next Generation of Women Leaders (McKinsey), Doctoral Student Honour Fellowship 2013–2014 (Intel) and the 2013 Architecture and Engineering Prize of the British Federation of Women Graduates.
