= Ian Hilsum =

English cricketer (born 1981)

Ian
Personal information
- Full name: Ian Jack Hilsum
- Born: 29 December 1981 (age 44); Newport, Isle of Wight, England
- Batting: Right-handed
- Bowling: Leg break

Domestic team information
- Years: Team
- 2002: Oxford University
- 2000: Hampshire Cricket Board

Career statistics
Competition	FC	LA
Matches	2	1
Runs scored	56	13
Batting average	14.00	–
100s/50s	–/–	–/–
Top score	23	13*
Balls bowled	30	24
Wickets	–	–
Bowling average	–	–
5 wickets in innings	–	–
10 wickets in match	–	–
Best bowling	–	–
Catches/stumpings	1/–	–/–
- Source: Cricinfo, 28 December 2009

Ian Jack Hilsum (born 29 December 1981 in Newport, Isle of Wight) is a former English cricketer. Hilsum was a right-handed batsman who bowled Leg break.

Hilsum made a single List-A appearance for the Hampshire Cricket Board in the 2000 NatWest Trophy against the Huntingdonshire.

In 2002 Hilsum made his first-class debut for Oxford University, where he played two matches against Northamptonshire and Gloucestershire.

Hilsum also played six Second Eleven Championship matches for the Hampshire Second XI between 1999 and 2003. He represented Hampshire 1st XI in one game against Loughborough University.
