= Sophie Harker =

British engineer and aerodynamicist

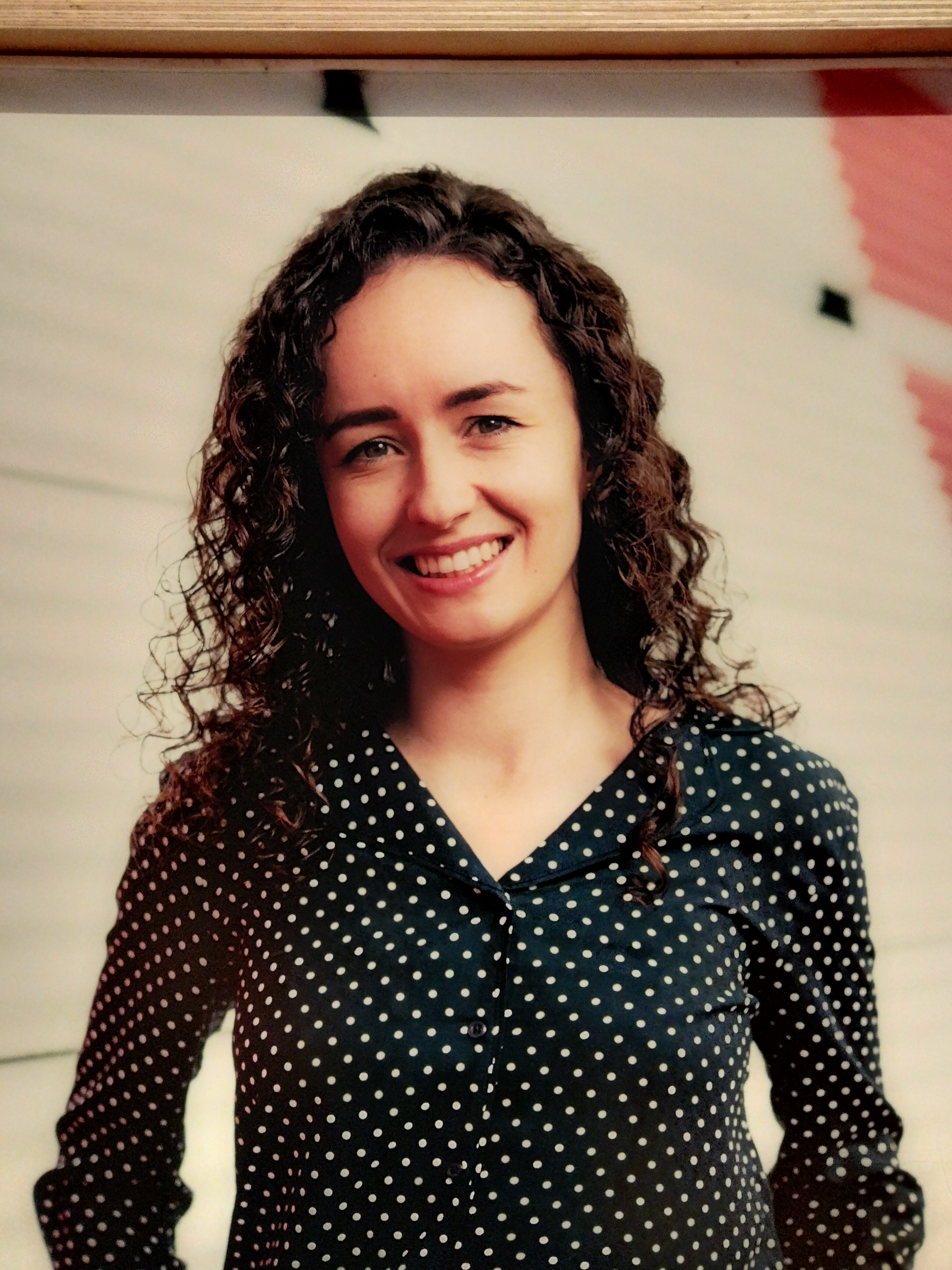
Image of Sophie Harker

Sophie Harker is a British engineer and an aerodynamicist. She specializes in aerodynamics and performance engineering within BAE Systems’ Concepts and Technology team, who works closely on the aircraft of the future. Harker is one of the youngest engineers to have achieved Chartered Engineer status, doing so at age 25. In 2018, she was the winner of the IET's Young Women Engineer of the Year Award.

== Early life and education ==
On a visit to the Kennedy Space Center in Florida at age 16, Harker decided to be an astronaut. She completed her master's degree in mathematics in the University of Nottingham. Whilst in university, she met Helen Sharman, who recommended engineering as a pathway to becoming an astronaut. She then focused on applied mathematics and completed an internship in software engineering for BAE Systems.

== Career ==
Harker joined BAE Systems Graduate Scheme, consisting of four engineering placements across various platforms and products, including the Eurofighter Typhoon; leading her to working in the Concepts & Technology Team. Currently, she is embedded in the Team Tempest engineering at BAE Systems where she works on technologies for Flight Control Systems to enable future combat air system capabilities. Harker has also worked on designs for the Skylon Space Plane, a fully reusable single stage to orbit (SSTO) space plane.

In March 2019, she returned to the University of Nottingham to deliver the "Women in Aerodynamics" lecture. Harker is an active STEM ambassador, she features in the Royal Academy of Engineering’s flagship, This Is Engineering, campaign which promotes careers in engineering.

== Honors and recognition ==
In 2016 Harker became BAE Systems' Technical Graduate of the Year. She then went on to being awarded Graduate of the Year 2017 by the Science, Engineering and Manufacturing Technologies Alliance (SEMTA) and in the same year featured in The Daily Telegraph's Top 50 Women in Engineering.

Harker was given the Bee Beamont award in 2018, which annually recognizes "newly qualified engineers who have made an outstanding contribution to the business in the early stages of their career."

She won the 2018 Young Woman Engineer of the Year Award.

Harker was awarded in 2019 at age 26 the Sir Henry Royce Medal, which recognized her research in developing future technologies for the aviation industry.

== Personal life ==
Harker lives in Lytham St Annes.
