= Worcester Sixth Form College =

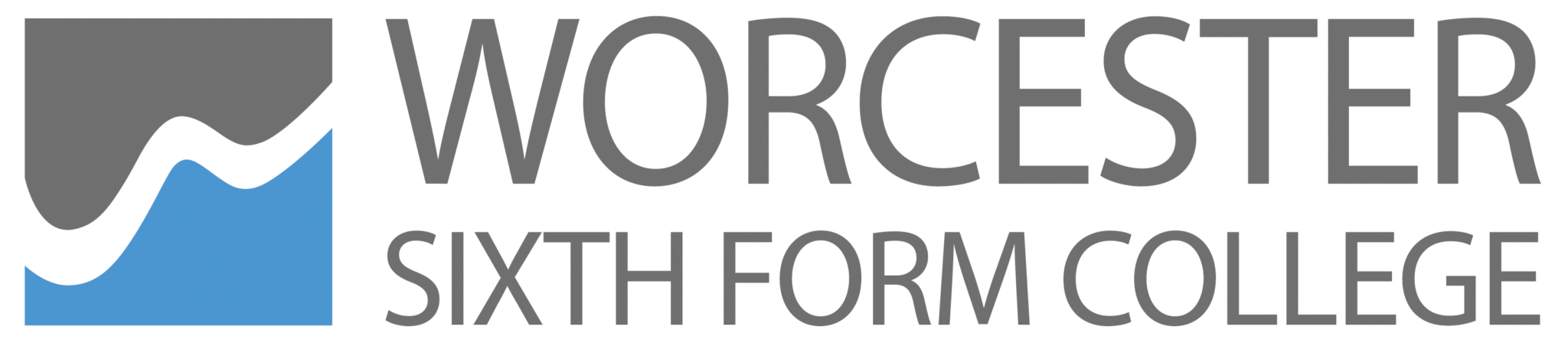

Location
- Spetchley Road; Worcester, Worcestershire, WR5 2LU; United Kingdom; 52.18391°N 2.18465°W

Information
- Type: Sixth Form College
- Established: 1983
- Local authority: Worcestershire
- Department for Education URN: 144888 Tables
- Ofsted: Reports
- Principal: Jane Jenkins
- Gender: Mixed
- Age: 16 to 19
- Enrolment: 1,750
- Former name: Worcester Grammar School for Girls
- Website: http://www.wsfc.ac.uk

Worcester Sixth Form College is a 16-19 Academy in Worcester, England. It is located in the south-east of the city and was founded on the site of the former Worcester Grammar School for Girls following reorganisation in 1983. The College joined the Heart of Mercia Multi-Academy Trust in 2019.

== Admissions ==
The College currently has approximately 1750 students enrolled. The majority of students are full-time and are enrolled on A Level, Applied or T Level courses. Thirty-four A Level subjects are presently offered along with Applied programmes in Business, Criminology, Engineering, Health and Social Care, Law, IT, and Sport & Exercise Science. In January 2023, an Ofsted inspection gave the College a Good rating.

In September 2014, work was completed on a Science Centre, with a £3 million extension completed in September 2023.

== History ==
=== Grammar school ===
As the City of Worcester Grammar School for Girls, it was situated on Sansome Walk in the centre of Worcester. This has now become flats. It started in 1908 as the Worcester Secondary School for Girls, which moved into new buildings on 2 November 1910, and moved again in 1929 to a site in Barbourne. It became the City of Worcester Grammar School for Girls in September 1945. In September 1962 it moved to the Spetchley Road site.

Royal Grammar School Worcester was the analogous boys' school, and was partly maintained by Hereford and Worcester until 1983 when it became completely independent. Due to the boys' school becoming independent, the LEA proposed changes to its education policy (under a Conservative government) during 1982 to create a 'super' co-educational grammar school on the girls' school site to educate 125 boys and girls (potentially) from the whole of Hereford and Worcester. Sir Keith Joseph had doubts about the scheme. The grammar school closed in 1983.

=== Sixth form college ===
The sixth form college opened in September 1983 - instead of a 'super' 11-18 co-educational grammar school and six 11-16 comprehensives in Worcester, the sixth form college model was chosen with six comprehensives. In 1998, the LEA changed from Hereford & Worcester to Worcestershire.

=== Former teachers ===
- Robin Parry, British theologian and writer
- Jacqui Smith, Labour MP for Redditch and former Home Secretary
- Rosamund Stanhope, poet
- Mary Taylor Slow, physicist, first woman to take up the study of radio as a profession.

== Alumni ==
=== Worcester Sixth Form College ===
- Simon Archer, Badminton player
- Laura Blindkilde Brown, Footballer
- Myles Edwards, Rugby player
- Matt Kvesic, Rugby player
- Chelsea Weston, Footballer
- Andy Short, Rugby player

=== Worcester Grammar School for Girls ===
- Karen Burt, engineer
- Nicky Gavron, Deputy Mayor of London from 2000–03 and 2004–08, Labour Member of the London Assembly from 2000-04 for Enfield and Haringey
- Jane Moore, Sun Columnist
- Elizabeth Organ, Artist and gallery owner
- Ann Diamond. Journalist and newsreader and mother

== Former teachers ==
- Patricia Kemp, taught German until 1974, the daughter of Bishop Kenneth Kirk, and wife of Bishop Eric Kemp, and mother of Edward Kemp (playwright)

== See also ==
- Worcester College of Technology, local further education college
