= Cyril Hilsum =

British physicist (1925–2026)

Cyril Hilsum CBE FRS HonFInstP FREng
- Hilsum at the Second International Conference on Research and Communications in Physics in 2008
- Born: 17 May 1925; London, England
- Died: 23 September 2026 (aged 101); London, England
- Education: University College London
- Known for: liquid-crystal science and technology
- Children: Lindsey Hilsum and Karen Burt
- Awards: FREng (1978); Max Born Prize (1987); Faraday Medal (1988); Richard Glazebrook Medal and Prize (1997); Royal Medal (2007)

Cyril Hilsum (17 May 1925 – 23 September 2026) was a British physicist and academic.

Hilsum was elected a member of the National Academy of Engineering in 1983 for the inventiveness and leadership in introducing III-V semiconductors into electronic technology.

== Education and career ==
Hilsum entered Raine's Foundation School in 1936 as the middle of three brothers, leaving in 1943 after being accepted into University College London, where he did his BSc. In 1945, he joined the Royal Naval Scientific Service, moving in 1947 to the Admiralty Research Laboratory. In 1950, he transferred again to the Services Electronics Research Laboratory (SERL) where he remained until 1964 before again moving, this time to the Royal Radar Establishment. In 1974 he became Chief Scientific Officer.

He won the Heinrich Welker Memorial Award in 1978, was elected a Fellow of the Royal Academy of Engineering, a Fellow of the Royal Society in 1979 and an honorary member of the American National Academy of Engineering.

In 1983, he was appointed chief scientist at GEC Hirst Research Centre. He was awarded the Max Born Prize in 1987, the 1988 Faraday Medal, and from then until 1990 served as president of the Institute of Physics. In the 1990 Queen's Birthday Honours, he was appointed a Commander of the Order of the British Empire (CBE) for "services to the Electrical and Electronics Industry". He was the subject of a photograph by Nick Sinclair in 1993 that is currently held by the National Portrait Gallery. In 1998, he was awarded the Richard Glazebrook Medal and Prize from the Institute of Physics, and is notable as the only scientist to hold both this and the Faraday Medal together.

He served as a corporate research advisor for various entities, including Cambridge Display Technology, the European Commission and Unilever. In 2007, he was awarded the Royal Society's Royal Medal "for his many outstanding contributions and for continuing to use his prodigious talents on behalf of industry, government and academe to this day".

Hilsum served as chairman of the scientific board for Peratech and was a visiting professor of physics at University College London, as well as sitting on the Defence Scientific Advisory Council. He also endorsed the Karen Burt Memorial Award, named after his daughter, which is awarded yearly by the Women's Engineering Society "to a woman engineer of high calibre who has newly attained full corporate membership and Chartered Engineer status through her relevant professional Institution and who has contributed to the promotion of the engineering profession". In 2006, he was made a Fellow of the ESSCIRC, and in 2007 wrote an obituary for Gareth Roberts for The Guardian and the Royal Society.

On 9 December 2025, Hilsum was given a Lifetime Achievement Award at the Electronics Weekly Elektra Awards, citing in particular his role in pioneering compound semiconductor technology and his research in LCD technology.

== Research ==
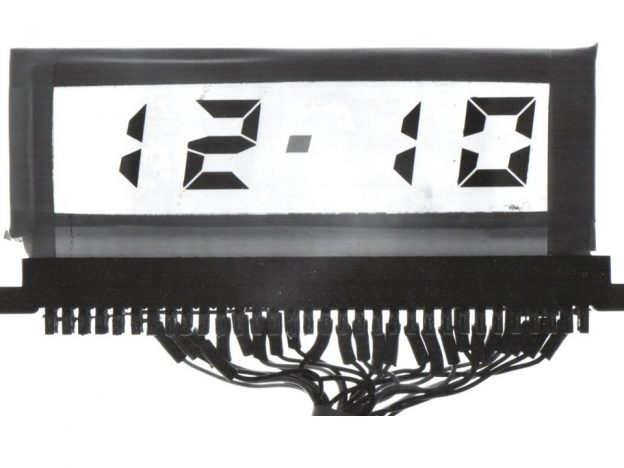
Demonstration digital clock using cyanobiphenyl liquid crystals made at the Royal Radar Establishment in 1973

While working for the Ministry of Defence, Hilsum helped develop commercial applications for gallium arsenide, and was responsible for creating the UK's first semiconductor laser. He was one of the developers of the Ridley-Watkins-Hilsum theory that provided the theoretical basis of the transferred electron device, better known as the Gunn diode, and his research also helped form the basis of modern LCD technology, bringing in over £100 million of royalties to the UK government.

Since 2006, the British Liquid Crystal Society has awarded the Hilsum Medal each year "to British candidates for overall contributions to liquid-crystal science and technology. The award is made to mid-career scientists who have made notable contributions to the subject over a number of years."

== Personal life and death ==
Cyril Hilsum was born on 17 May 1925. He was born in the East End of London and was the second of three sons of Jewish parents, Benjamin Hilsum, a street peddler, and his wife, Ada. He married Betty Hilsum, with whom he had two daughters, Lindsey, a news correspondent for Channel 4, and Karen Burt, an engineer who died in 1997 and in whose name Hilsum endowed a Women's Engineering Society memorial award.

Hilsum turned 100 in 2025, and died in London on 23 September 2026, at the age of 101. Michael S. Rosenwald's New York Times obituary remarked that he had "survived into his 11th decade by avoiding fresh vegetables and subsisting largely on TV dinners, chocolate and red wine".

== Works ==
- Semiconducting III-V Compounds (Monographs on Semiconductors), C. Hilsum, 239 pages, Publ. Elsevier (1961), ISBN 0-08-009499-6
- Liquid Crystals, C. Hilsum, Cambridge Univ Press (1985), ISBN 0-521-30465-2
- Device Physics (Vol. 4 of Handbook on Semiconductors), C. Hilsum and T.S. Moss (Editors), 1244 pages, Publ. JAI Press (1993) ISBN 0-444-88813-6
- Communications After AD2000, C. Hilsum, D.E.N. Davies, A.W. Rudge (Editors), Chapman & Hall, (1993), ISBN 0-412-49550-3
