= Yewande Akinola =

Nigerian engineer specializing in water supply

Yewande Akinola MBE HonFREng
- Born: 1984 (age 41–42); Ibadan, Nigeria
- Education: Cranfield University; University of Warwick
- Employer: Laing O'Rourke
- Known for: Design engineering

Yewande Akinola (born 1984) is a chartered engineer who specialises in sustainable water supplies. She works as principal engineer for Laing O'Rourke and hosts television shows about engineering for Channel 4 and National Geographic.

== Education ==
Yewande Akinola was born in 1984 in Nigeria. As a child she designed model-sized houses. Her father, J. M Akinola, was Permanent Secretary in the Ministry of Works of the old Western Region in Nigeria. Yewande Akinola studied Engineering Design and Appropriate Technology at the University of Warwick, which she completed in 2007. During her degree she was a mechanical engineer for Thames Water, where she worked on clean water treatment sites. In 2007 she was employed by Arup Group as a Design Engineer designing water supplies and water management systems. Whilst working for Arup, she earned a master's degree from Cranfield University in 2011.

== Career ==
Yewande Akinola is interested in developing water and sanitation for underdeveloped countries. She has worked on projects in the UK, Africa, Middle East and East Asia. She is the founder of the Global Emit Project, which mentors young people who are interested in engineering.

In 2010 Yewande Akinola presented Titanic: The Mission for Channel 4 and National Geographic Society. In 2012 she judged the Queen Elizabeth Prize for Engineering competition to create a trophy. That year, she was shortlisted and won the IET Young Woman Engineer of the Year Award. She has also presented for CBeebies and Yesterday TV. Yewande Akinola has appeared on BBC Radio 4. In 2014 Yewande Akinola designed a Rainwater Harvesting System.

In 2013 Akinola worked with Girl Guiding UK to encourage more young women into engineering. She featured in a Royal Academy of Engineering campaign "Designed to Inspire". She was featured on the QEPrize 2014 campaign "Create The Future". She delivered a keynote talk at the 2016 Ada Lovelace day celebration. She featured in the Institution of Engineering and Technology 2017 campaign "Portrait of an Engineer". In 2021 she was elected an Honorary Fellow of the Royal Academy of Engineering

== Awards ==
1998 - Nigerian National Mathematics Award

2009 - UK’s Society of Public Health Engineers Award for Young Rising Star

2012 - Exceptional Achiever Award by the Association for Black Engineers (AFBE-UK)

2012 - Young Woman Engineer of the Year from the IET

2013 - Management Today’s top 35 women under 35

2014 - PRECIOUS Award for Outstanding Woman in STEM

== See also ==
- Omolabake Adenle
- Ozak Esu
- Omobola Johnson
- Joana Maduka
