= Ozak Esu =

Nigerian electrical engineer

- Born: Ozak-Obazi Oluwaseyi Esu; 23 April 1991 (age 35); Kaduna, Nigeria
- Education: Loughborough University (BEng, PhD)
- Awards: Young Woman Engineer of the Year Award (2017)
- Scientific career
- Fields: Electronic engineering
- Workplaces: Cundall Johnston and Partners
- Thesis: Vibration-based condition monitoring of wind turbine blades (2016)
- Doctoral advisor: James Flint
- Website: cundall.com/Careers/Meet%20our%20team/Ozak-Esu.aspx

Ozak-Obazi Oluwaseyi Esu (born 23 April 1991) is a Nigerian electrical engineer who is the technical lead at the BRE Centre for Smart Homes and Buildings (CSHB). She previously worked at Cundall in Birmingham, designing the electrical services for buildings.

== Education ==
Ozak Esu was born in Kaduna, Nigeria. She completed her A-Level examinations in mathematics, physics and geography in Lagos. She has said that the energy problem in Nigeria inspired her to study engineering at university. The "frequent power cuts which I experienced that made me decide to take a keen interest in Physics".

In 2008 she moved to the UK, where she earned a bachelor's degree in Electronic and Electrical Engineering. She was president of the Nigerian Society. She secured a £54,000 scholarship for postgraduate study, and earned her PhD in 2016, working on wind turbine blades supervised by James Flint. Her PhD demonstrated the opportunities for instrumenting low-cost sensors in consumer electronics for vibration-based condition monitoring of wind turbine blades. Alongside publishing her work in scientific journals, (Renewable Energy, System, REWE), Esu presented at renewable energy and vibration testing international conferences across Europe and in the USA. In 2013 she presented at the Harnessing the Energy – Women’s Engineering Society conference.

== Career and research ==
Esu joined Cundall Johnston and Partners in November 2014 as a graduate engineer whilst completing her PhD at Loughborough University. She contributed to the technical design, and supervised construction of over sixteen primary and secondary schools across the UK within her first two years at the company. She was also part of the design team for the Energy Systems Catapult office in Birmingham, awarded the prestigious British Council for Offices ‘Fit Out of Workplace’ Midlands Regional Award 2017. In 2017 she was promoted to electrical engineer. In this role Esu was responsible for leading, managing and coordinating the appraisal of existing electrical infrastructure, and the design of new electrical building services, as well as acting as a mentor for students.

In January 2019, Esu joined the BRE (Building Research Establishment) as technical lead at the BRE Centre for Smart Homes and Buildings (CSHB). The CSHB describes itself as "a collaborative hub for industry, academia and government. It works to accelerate the use of smart products and services within the built environment, to maximise the benefits for all and address common challenges in the Internet of Things (IoT) market".

In this role Esu is responsible for performing research on a range of topics around smart buildings, scoping new projects and developing proposals and propositions. This gives her the opportunity 'to bring her PhD expertise to bear on the subject of “smart cities” '.

Alongside her job, Esu serves as a guest lecturer at the University of Bath, University of Lincoln, Loughborough University and London South Bank University.

=== Public engagement and diversity ===
Esu dedicates time to initiatives that promote diversity, inclusion, equality, and seek to empower women and minority ethnic groups working and studying in STEM related disciplines. These include serving in roles as panellist for Association for Black and Minority Ethnic Engineers (AFBE-UK), research student contributor to Loughborough University Athena SWAN Award Committee investigating barriers preventing female students from progressing on to roles in academia, and mentor at The Visiola Foundation, Nigeria.

Esu presents her academic and professional career experience to children at schools, and students at universities, promoting science, technology, engineering and mathematics education and careers. She has also been involved with campaigns such as Careers in STEM, Portrait of an Engineer, and HM Government Year of Engineering 2018. Esu has featured on Made in Birmingham and Channel 4 Extreme Cake Makers.

=== Awards and honours ===
In 2013, Esu won the Inaugural Energy Young Entrepreneur Scheme (Energy YES) worth £2,000 whilst working within a team of four doctoral candidates from MEGS (Midlands Energy Graduate School). Esu was named one of "The Women's Engineering Society's "Top 50 Women in Engineering under 35" list on 23 June 2017. She was the 2017 Institution of Engineering and Technology Young Woman Engineer of the Year. In September 2017, she won the Institution of Engineering and Technology Mike Sargeant Career Achievement Award for Young Professionals in recognition of her contributions to engineering and technology.
