= Electronic badge =

Gadget replacing paper passes at public events

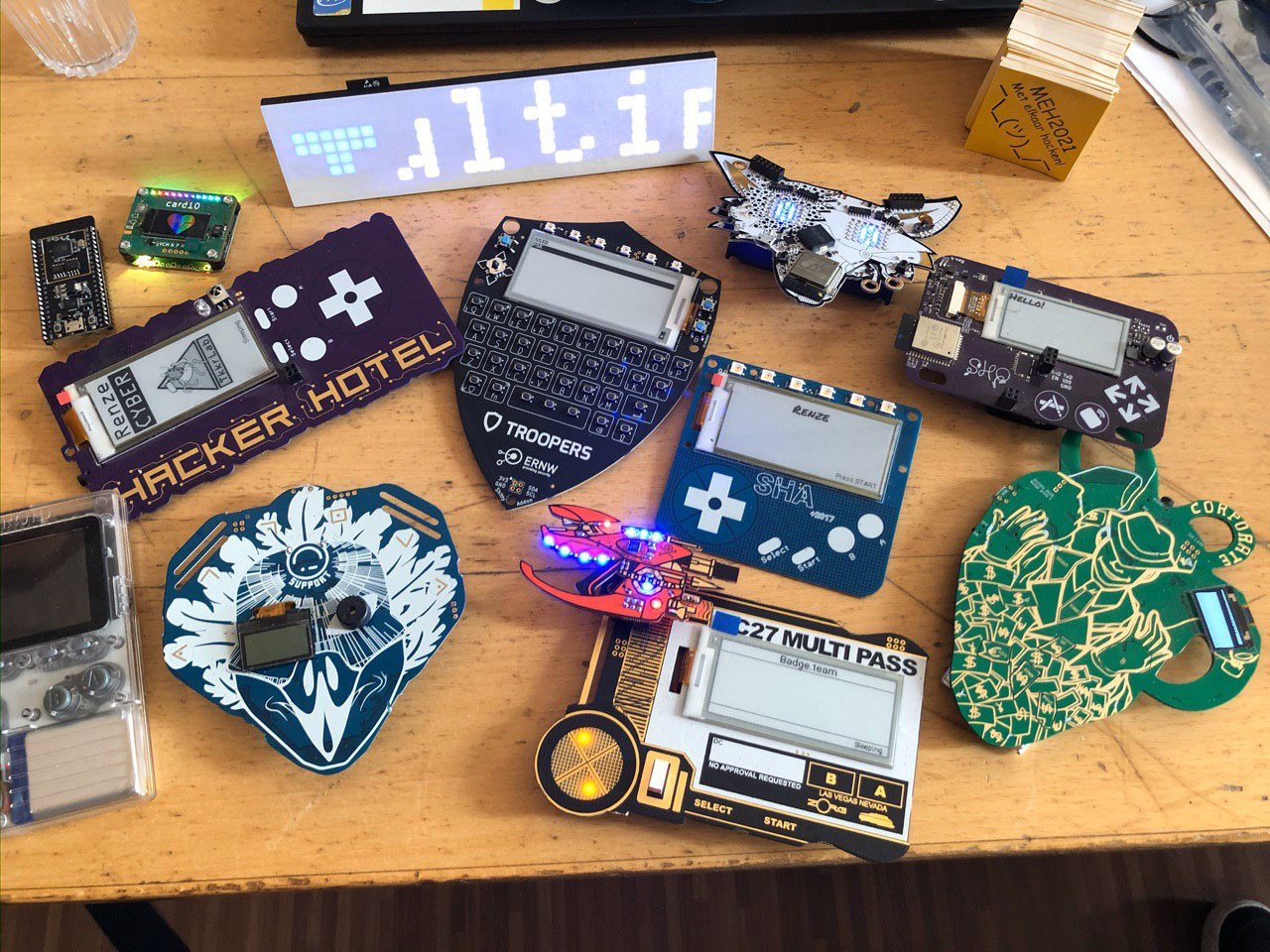
Several electronic badges from conferences such as CCCamp and SHA2017

An electronic badge (or electronic conference badge) is a gadget that is a replacement for a traditional paper-based badge or pass issued at public events. It is mainly handed out at computer (security) conferences and hacker events. Their main feature is to display the name of the attendee, but due to their electronic nature they can include a variety of software. The badges were originally a tradition at DEF CON, but spread across different events.

== Examples ==
=== Hardware ===
- SHA2017 badge, which included an e-ink screen and an ESP32
- Card10 for CCCamp2019
- Electromagnetic Field Camp badge

=== Software ===
The organization badge.team has developed a platform called "Hatchery" to publish and develop software for several badges.
