= Karen Burt =

British engineer (1954–1997)

- Born: Karen Ann Hilsum; 26 November 1954
- Died: 20 June 1997 (aged 42); Islington, London, England
- Education: University of Cambridge; University of Reading
- Organization: Women's Engineering Society
- Known for: Advocacy; Engineering

Karen Ann Hilsum Burt (née Hilsum; 26 November 1954 – 20 June 1997) was a British engineer and campaigner for the recruitment and retention of women in engineering.

== Early life and education ==
Burt attended Hillside School, Malvern and Worcester Girl's Grammar School. She studied at Newnham College, Cambridge and completed a PhD in electron microscopy at the University of Reading.

Her father is professor Cyril Hilsum, a physicist best known for research that helped form the basis of modern LCD technology. Her mother, Betty Hilsum, died at the age of 61 of cancer. Her parents had met while at University College London on Scholarships.

Her sister is the journalist Lindsey Hilsum.

== Career ==
Burt joined British Aerospace as a project engineer for scientific satellites, and was eventually promoted to senior systems engineer. Subsequently, she developed an interest in management, becoming a Business Acquisition Manager.

Burt left British Aerospace and established her own consultancy. In addition, she helped University College London establish the Centre for Advanced Instrumentation Systems. She contributed to the Women's Engineering Society, Institute of Physics and Institute of Electrical and Electronics Engineers. In 1983 and 1984 Burt presented a Faraday Lecture, Let's Build A Satellite, on behalf of the Institute of Electrical and Electronics Engineers and British Aerospace.

She was appointed to the London Branch Committee of the Women's Engineering Society in 1987. She was a campaigner for career breaks and gave advice to members of the Women's Engineering Society in how to manage returning to work. Burt was appointed to the Women's Engineering Society Council in 1991. She presented at the 1991 International Conference of Women Engineers and Scientists. Having just accepted a faculty position at University College London, Burt suffered a fatal stroke in June 1997, aged only 42.

=== Legacy ===
Since 1999, the Women's Engineering Society have celebrated Karen Burt with a memorial award for newly chartered women in engineering, applied science or information technology. Each year the Women's Engineering Society requests one nomination from each participating Professional Engineering Institution, and from these a winner is chosen. The award recognises significant potential in engineering and it was originally set up to encourage a greater number of women to aim for, and to celebrate, the achievement of Chartered Engineer status. Winners receive £1,000, at the bequest of her father, Cyril Hilsum.

==== Karen Burt Award Winners ====
- 1999: Rebecca Dowsett, Institution of Electrical Engineers
- 2000: Una McQuaid, Institution of Civil Engineers
- 2001: Beth Hutchison, British Computer Society
- 2002: Helen Marson, Institution of Chemical Engineers
- 2003: Jane Wild, Institution of Mechanical Engineers
- 2004: Suzanne Bland, Institution of Civil Engineers
- 2005: Katy Roelich, Chartered Institution of Water and Environmental Management
- 2006: Louise Dougan (née McDevitt), Institute of Highway Engineers
- 2007: Jane Hunter, Institute of Highway Engineers
- 2008: Emily Spearman, Energy Institute
- 2009: Katy Deacon, Institution of Engineering and Technology
- 2010: Julie Templeton, Institution of Civil Engineers
- 2011: Dr Gemma Whatling, Institution of Mechanical Engineers
- 2012: Kate Cooksey, Institution of Civil Engineers
- 2013: Professor Molly Stevens, Institute of Materials, Minerals and Mining
- 2014: Elaine Greaney, Institute of Engineering and Technology
- 2015: Helen Randell, Institution of Civil Engineers
- 2016: Clare Lavelle, Energy Institute
- 2017: Madeleine Jones, Institution of Chemical Engineers
- 2018: Dr Susan Deeny, Institution of Fire Engineers
- 2019: Mandy Lester, Institution of Chemical Engineers
- 2020: Tina Gunnarrsson, Institution of Civil Engineers
- 2021: Dr Eleanor Earl, Institution of Civil Engineers
- 2022: Dr Emma Walton, Institute of Physics
- 2023: Dr Angeliki (Kelly) Loukatou, Institution of Engineering and Technology
- 2024: Kerry Evans, Institution of Highways and Transportation
- 2025: Juliette Goddard, Institution of Mechanical Engineers
