= Lindsey Hilsum =

English television journalist and writer (born 1958)

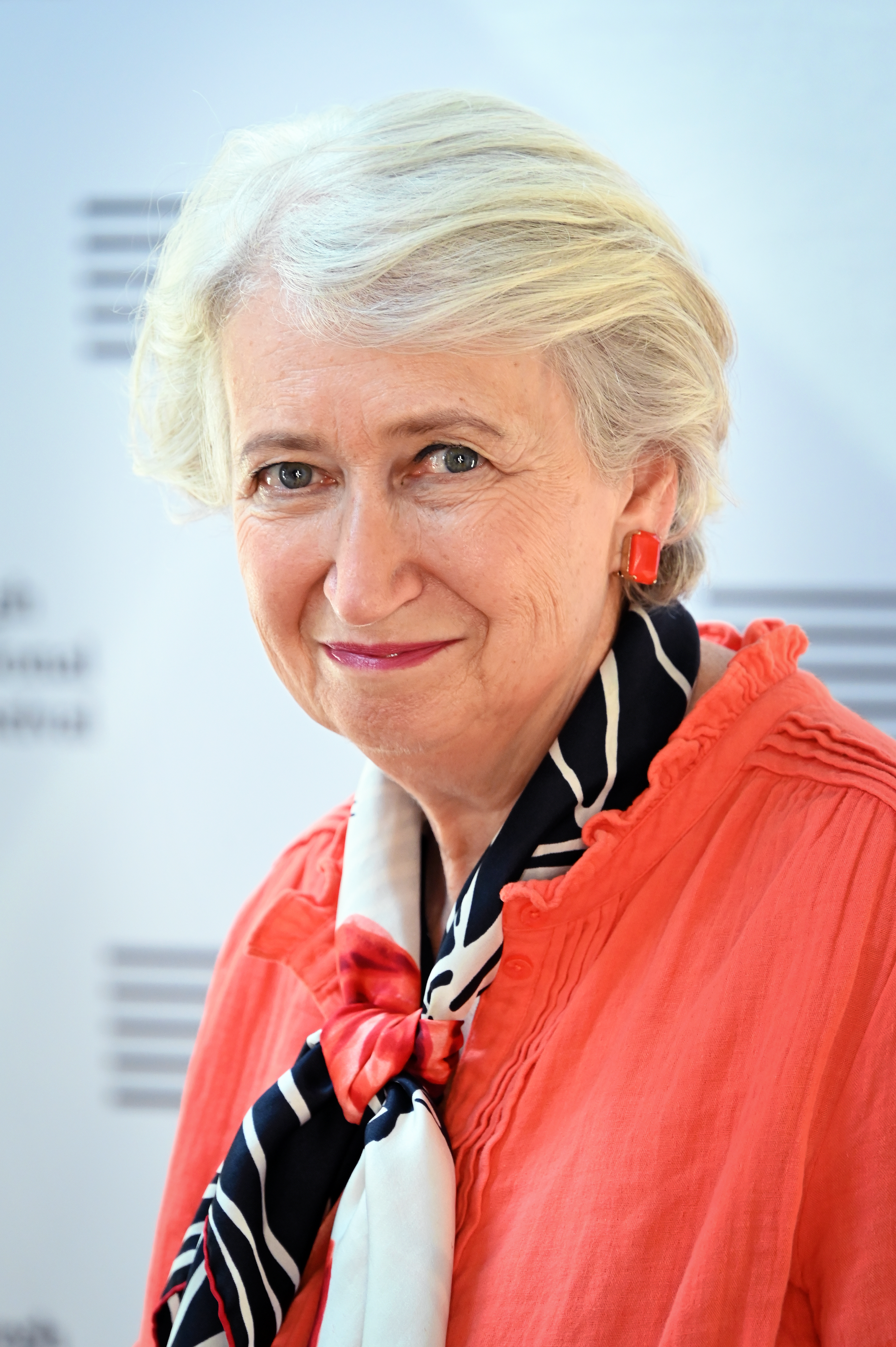
- Hilsum in 2025
- Born: 3 August 1958 (age 68)
- Education: Worcester Grammar School for Girls
- Alma mater: University of Exeter
- Occupation: Journalist
- Known for: International Editor for Channel 4 News
- Notable work: Sandstorm (2012); In Extremis (2018)
- Father: Cyril Hilsum
- Relatives: Karen Burt (sister)
- Awards: Patron's Medal of the Royal Geographical Society; James Tait Black Memorial Prize

Lindsey Hilsum (born 3 August 1958) is an English television journalist and writer. She is the International Editor for Channel 4 News, and has reported from six continents, including coverage of the major conflicts in Syria, Iraq, Kosovo, Rwanda and Ukraine in the past two decades. She is also a regular contributor to The Sunday Times, The Observer, The Guardian, New Statesman, and Granta.

Hilsum is author of the books Sandstorm: Libya in the Time of Revolution (2012) and In Extremis: The Life and Death of the War Correspondent Marie Colvin (2018). She is the recipient of several awards, among which are the Patron's Medal from the Royal Geographical Society in 2017, and the James Tait Black Memorial Prize in the biography category for In Extremis.

== Early life ==
Born in 1958, Lindsey Hilsum was brought up in Malvern, Worcestershire. Her father is professor Cyril Hilsum, a physicist best known for research that helped form the basis of modern LCD technology. Her mother, Betty Hilsum, died of cancer when Hilsum was 29. Her parents had met while at University College London on scholarships.

Her sister, Karen Burt, a British engineer and campaigner for the recruitment and retention of women in engineering, died in 1997 of a stroke.

Hilsum attended Worcester Grammar School for Girls and the University of Exeter, where she graduated with a degree in French and Spanish.

== Career ==
Lindsey Hilsum is International Editor for Channel 4 News. She has covered major conflicts including the wars in Iraq, Afghanistan and Kosovo and the Israeli-Palestinian conflict. In 2011, she reported the uprisings in Egypt and Bahrain, as well as Libya. She has also reported extensively from Iran and Zimbabwe, and was Channel 4 News China Correspondent from 2006 to 2008. During the 2004 US assault on Fallujah, she was embedded with a frontline marine unit, and in 1994, she was the only English-speaking foreign correspondent in Rwanda when the genocide began. Before becoming a journalist, Hilsum was an aid worker, first in Latin America and then in Africa.

Her first book, Sandstorm: Libya in the Time of Revolution, was published by Faber in the UK in April 2012, and by Penguin Press in the US in May 2012, and was shortlisted for the Guardian First Book Award (2012). Her second book, In Extremis, a biography of the late war correspondent Marie Colvin, alongside whom she worked in many war zones, was published by Farrar, Straus and Giroux in the US in November 2018, and by Chatto & Windus in the UK in January 2019. In Extremis was shortlisted for the 2019 Costa Book Awards in the biography category, and won the James Tait Black Memorial Prize in the Biography category.

Her next book, I Brought the War with Me: Stories and Poems from the Front Line, published in September 2024, is a memoir that Andrew Motion describes as "Remarkable: combines her exceptional experience as a war correspondent with selected poetry in an act of witness".

She was invited to choose her favourite records and other items on BBC Radio 4's Desert Island Discs on 30 March 2025.

== Views ==
In an interview with The Oxford Student in 2010, Hilsum remarked that American news media "shows almost no images of death, of killing, of injury – the result was that people thought it was a blood-free war, and that affects how people feel about what their government does". In contrast, the Arab news media broadcasts much more graphic images of the reality of war. When deciding what is acceptable to broadcast from conflict zones, she argues that the crucial question is whether "you are using those images as propaganda, or whether you are using them to try and tell people the truth about war". She says that this "is a very difficult thing to get right", and emphasizes that it is not the place of a foreign correspondent to manipulate emotive images "to make a political point".

== Bibliography ==
- Sandstorm: Libya in the Time of Revolution (2012)
- In Extremis: The Life and Death of the War Correspondent Marie Colvin (2018)
- I Brought the War with Me: Stories and Poems from the Front Line (September 2024)

== Awards ==
Hilsum was awarded an honorary doctorate by the University of Essex in 2004 and has won several awards, including the Royal Television Society Journalist of the Year, James Cameron Award, One World Broadcasting Trust award, Amnesty, Voice of the Listener & Viewer and the Charles Wheeler Award.

In 2017, she was awarded the Patron's Medal of the Royal Geographical Society, "for promoting the understanding of global conflict and inequality".

She won the 2018 James Tait Black Memorial Prize (Biography) for In Extremis.

In 2019, she was conferred with an honorary doctorate by SOAS University of London.
