= NSD (disambiguation) =

NSD is an open-source server program for the Domain Name System.

NSD may also refer to:

- NASA standard detonator
- Nassi–Shneiderman diagram
- National School of Drama in India
- Norrländska Socialdemokraten, a Swedish newspaper
- Norwegian Social Science Data Services
- National Security Database, India
- National Security Department, Hong Kong
- United States Department of Justice National Security Division
- National Security Directive of the US George H. W. Bush presidency
- Neuronal Alpha-Synuclein Disease
- New Serb Democracy, a Montenegrin political party
- National Settlement Depository, a Russian Central securities depository
- Nampa School District
- Nebraska School for the Deaf
- Noise spectral density
- Northshore School District
- Normandy School District, now Normandy Schools Collaborative
