= Activation key =

Activation key may refer to:

- Product activation
- Product key
- Volume license key
- Key changer (software)
