= Null Community =

Indian nonprofit organization

Null, or n|u, is a registered not-for-profit society and the largest active security community in India with over 8 chapters in major cities - Ahmedabad, Bangalore, Chennai, Delhi, Hyderabad, Mumbai, Mysore, Pune and Trivandrum.

== History ==
An open hacker/security community that was founded in 2010 with the idea of providing an integrated platform for exchanging information on the latest attack vectors, zero day vulnerabilities and unknown threats. The community is formed by members from security background with experience in corporate world.

== Annual events ==
As an open-source community, Null also has a hacker-conference, under the name Nullcon, which is managed and marketed by Payatu Technologies.

== Recent conferences/events ==
- n|u'con Goa (March 2016)
