= THOTCON =

Annual nonprofit hacker conference in Chicago, IL

- Genre: Cybersecurity, hacking
- Locations: Chicago, Illinois
- Inaugurated: 2010
- Previous event: 2025
- Next event: 2027

Thotcon (stylized THOTCON) is Chicago's first-ever hacker conference, whose name is derived from the first letter(s) in the words that represent Chicago's first telephone Area Code: 312 (THree-One-Two). The event is produced by THOTCON Infinity NFP, a tax-exempt 501(c)(3) nonprofit organization., and held every 2 years, usually in May. The event numbering scheme is expressed in hexadecimal.

Originally organized by Nicholas Percoco, Matt "Jaku" Jakubowski, Jonathan "SakeBomb" Tomek, John Mocuta, David "VideoMan" Bryan, and several others who were all volunteers from the local "DEF CON 312" meetup chapter. It is held at a "top secret" location each year which is not publicly disclosed, though this location does not change often.

The conference was originally held on a single day but expanded to two consecutive days from 2015 onward. It currently features multiple tracks of speakers presenting on various information security and hacking topics. These talks range in length from standard 45-minute seminars, shorter "Turbo Talks", and longer demo and workshop presentations.

The conference also features "villages," which operate during the entire length of the conference. These offer subject matter experts who often provide hands-on instruction for various topics such as locksport, wireless security hacking, and other technical topics. Vendor booths are also present featuring representatives from various information security companies as well as nonprofit organizations such as Women in CyberSecurity and Black Girls Code.

Contests are also prevalent at the conference, the most difficult of which may offer the highly-coveted prize of a "Gold Badge," which offers free lifetime admission to all future THOTCON events. These contests are often both technical and non-technical, offering all skill levels a fair chance at winning something. Recurring contests include: solving the challenge inside the electronic conference badge, the "Hacker Jeopardy" game show, and completing esoteric physical challenges.

In later years, food and beverages, including alcoholic, began being offered for sale at the conference by the venue. A "VIP" area was added for use by anyone possessing a VIP badge, which offers a quiet, secluded lounge as well as free food and beverages.

The conference has also always featured some sort of "After-Party," though some years this is "unofficial" and not directly organized or funded by the conference. It is however always featured in the program. The after-party often features EDM by DJs from the hacker scene who attend the conference such as FuzzyNOP of Dual Core, as well as bands such as I Fight Dragons and Information Society.

The conference is primarily funded by information security sponsors, however some income is also generated by attendees purchasing admission and merchandise.

The 13th event, thus titled "THOTCON 0xD," was held on May 30–31, 2025, at the Irish American Heritage Center. The next event, 0xE, is expected in Spring of 2027.

== History ==
- THOTCON 0x1 was held on April 23, 2010, at Joe's Bar.

The conference had approximately 216 attendees and 12 talks.

- THOTCON 0x2 was held on April 15, 2011, also at Joe's Bar in Chicago, IL.

The conference had approximately 310 attendees and 12 talks.

- THOTCON 0x3 was held on April 27, 2012, at the Ravenswood Event Center, 4025 N Ravenswood, Chicago, IL.

The conference had approximately 493 attendees and 11 full-length talks, as well as 8 "Turbo" talks.

- THOTCON 0x4 was held on April 26, 2013, at the Ravenswood Event Center, 4025 N Ravenswood, Chicago, IL.

The conference had approximately 705 attendees and featured 9 full-length talks, 11 shorter "Turbo" and "Newbie" talks, and 3 2.5-hour workshops. It was the first year to add keynotes, of which there were 2: Bruce Schneier presenting "Trust, Security, and Society" and Josh Corman & Jericho presenting "Cyberwar!: Not What We Were Expecting." It was also the first year to add refreshments for sale, preventing the need to leave the conference.

- THOTCON 0x5 was held on April 25, 2014, at the Ravenswood Event Center, 4025 N Ravenswood, Chicago, IL.

The conference had approximately 793 attendees and featured 9 full-length talks, 11 shorter "Turbo" talks, and 7 1-hour how-to "labs." Keynotes were delivered by Richard Thieme on "UFOs and Government: a Case Study in Disinformation, Deception, and Perception Management" and David Mortman on "It Ain't Rocket Science." It was the only year to offer these labs and also featured the first beer brewing competition.

- THOTCON 0x6 was held on May 14–15, 2015, at the Ravenswood Event Center, 4025 N Ravenswood, Chicago, IL.

The conference had approximately 1054 attendees and was the first year the conference hosted 2 full days of multiple presentation tracks, with 14 full-length talks (including 4 keynotes) and 21 "Turbo" talks. Keynotes were delivered by Chris Valasek on "The Ghost of Security Past," Tod Beardsley & egypt on "Wanna Cyber?", Jack Daniel on "InfoSec: What we know, and what we need to know," and Jon Callas on "Everything You Need to Know About Crypto in 50 minutes." Long-form workshops and labs were discontinued this year.

- THOTCON 0x7 was held on May 5–6, 2016, at the Ravenswood Event Center, 4025 N Ravenswood, Chicago, IL.

The conference had approximately 1137 attendees and hosted 13 full-length talks and 17 "Turbo" talks. Keynotes were delivered by Robert Graham on "Attack of the Clichés," Cyber Squirrel 1 on "35 Years of Cyberwar: The Squirrels are Winning," and Jon Oberheide & Michael Hanley on "Extrapolating from Billions of Access Security Events."

- THOTCON 0x8 was held on May 4–5, 2017, at the Ravenswood Event Center, 4025 N Ravenswood, Chicago, IL.

Keynotes were delivered by Allan Cecil on "TASBot," Samy Kamkar on "The Less Hacked Path," Micah Zenko on "Red Teaming Insights and Examples From Beyond the Infosec Community," and c7five on "The Future of THOTCON."
It was also the first year to feature the Jaku and Pals puppet show, which has since become a running gag at the conference, being used to fill up extra time in the talk tracks.

- THOTCON 0x9 was held on May 5–6, 2018, at the Irish American Heritage Center

The conference had approximately 1492 attendees and hosted 14 full-length talks and 25 "Turbo" talks as well as 5 2-hour presentation sessions. Keynotes were delivered by Cory Doctorow on "The war on general purpose computing is an existential threat to infosec -- and the world," Wendy Nather on "Denial of Trust: The New Attacks," Chris Wysopal on "The Hacker Community Must Always Exist," and Keren Elazari on "Hackers: Still the Internet's Immune System?"

- THOTCON 0xA was held on May 3–4, 2019 at the Irish American Heritage Center.

The conference had approximately 1664 attendees and hosted 13 full-length talks and 19 "Turbo" talks as well as 5 2-hour presentation sessions. Keynotes were delivered by Sheila Berta on "Your non-connected car is not as safe as you think...," Ryan D. Clarke on "Hacking the Hackers: Finding friends and building a career as a hacker since 300 baud," Josh Corman on "Where Do We Go From Here?," and Rachel Tobac on "The Human Exploit: Gaining Access Through Principles of Persuasion." The game show "Hacker Jeopardy," popularized at DEF CON by Aaron "Linitle" Lint, G. Mark Hardy, and Winn Schwartau, and hosted by Lintile, was first added to the Contests roster this year.

- THOTCON 0xB was held on October 8–9, 2021, at the Irish American Heritage Center

The conference had approximately 1694 attendees and hosted 11 full-length talks (returning to having only 2 keynotes) and 11 "Turbo" talks as well as 4 2-hour presentation sessions. Keynotes were delivered by Emmanuel Goldstein on "The Evolution of Hackers Over the Years" and Katie Nickels on "Your Brain is Lying To You: Lessons from Intelligence to Change How You Think."

- THOTCON 0xC was held on May 19–20, 2023, at the Irish American Heritage Center

The conference had approximately 1873 attendees and hosted 11 full-length talks and 15 "Turbo" talks as well as 4 2-hour presentation sessions. Keynotes were delivered by Eric Hughes on "Log in, Key up, and Drop out: Back to Cypherpunks Basics" and Jesse McGraw (GhostExodus) on "Insider Revelations: DOJ Machinations Against Hackers." Later this year the conference announced it would be moving to a biannual cycle.

- THOTCON 0xD was held on May 30–31, 2025, at an undisclosed location in Chicago, IL.

The conference had approximately 1771 attendees and hosted 9 full-length talks (including 2 keynotes) and 15 "Turbo" talks as well as 2 2-hour workshop sessions. The opening keynote was delivered by Clifford Stoll, author of The Cuckoo's Egg, presenting his seminal paper "Stalking the Wily Hacker." The closing keynote featured the original THOTCON founders reflecting on the conference's history. Amateur radio license exams were offered on-site for the first time, administered by the North Shore Radio Club.

== Notable Speakers ==
Past speakers of THOTCON events have included:

- Bruce Schneier, an American cryptographer, computer security and privacy specialist, and writer.
- Jayson E. Street, author of "Dissecting the hack: The F0rb1dd3n Network"
- Rafal Los, author of the HP blog "Following the White Rabbit"
- Ryan Jones, star of the TV show Tiger Team (TV series)
- Dave Marcus, director of security research at McAfee
- G. Mark Hardy, president of National Security Corporation
- Samy Kamkar, a prolific American programmer, freelance security researcher, and hacker
- Cory Doctorow, a Canadian science fiction author, activist, journalist, blogger and Special Advisor to the Electronic Frontier Foundation
- Dustin Heywood (known as EvilMog), member of Team Hashcat and Senior Hacker at IBM X-Force Red
- int80 (David Martinjak) from Dual Core
- Richard Thieme, a former priest who became a commentator on technology and culture
- Chris Valasek, a computer security researcher with Cruise, best known for his work in automotive security research.
- Clifford Stoll, American astronomer, author, and teacher, best known for his book The Cuckoo's Egg, which details his investigation of a hacker working for the KGB. He delivered the keynote at THOTCON 0xD.
