= Martin McKeay =

American computer security expert (born 1971)

Martin McKeay (born June 29, 1971) is a United States computer security expert and blogger who works for Akamai Technologies as a Security Evangelist. He writes one of the most popular security blogs and also a podcast called the Network Security Podcast. He is a Qualified Security Assessor. In 2006, he started blogging for Computer World.

He was a product evangelist for StillSecure.

He has been a speaker at many conferences including Hacker Halted, RSA Conference and DEF CON.

He is an advocate of the Payment Card Industry Data Security Standard.
