= Blackhole exploit kit =

Malware toolkit

The Blackhole exploit kit was, as of 2012, the most prevalent web threat, where 29% of all web threats detected by Sophos and 91% by AVG are due to this exploit kit. Its purpose is to deliver a malicious payload to a victim's computer. According to Trend Micro the majority of infections due to this exploit kit were done in a series of high volume spam runs. The kit incorporates tracking mechanisms so that people maintaining the kit know considerable information about the victims arriving at the kit's landing page. The information tracked includes the victim's country, operating system, browser and which piece of software on the victim's computer was exploited. These details are shown in the kit's user interface.

== History ==
Blackhole exploit kit was released on "Malwox", an underground Russian hacking forum. It made its first appearance in 2010.

The supposedly Russian creators use the names "HodLuM" and "Paunch". It was reported on October 7, 2013 that "Paunch" had been arrested.

Dmitry "Paunch" Fedotov was sentenced to seven years in a Russian penal colony on April 12, 2016.

== Function ==
1. The customer licenses the Blackhole exploit kit from the authors and specifies various options to customize the kit.
2. A potential victim loads a compromised web page or opens a malicious link in a spammed email.
3. The compromised web page or malicious link in the spammed email sends the user to a Blackhole exploit kit server's landing page.
4. This landing page contains obfuscated JavaScript that determines what is on the victim's computers and loads all exploits to which this computer is vulnerable and sometimes a Java applet tag that loads a Java Trojan horse.
5. If there is an exploit that is usable, the exploit loads and executes a payload on the victim's computer and informs the Blackhole exploit kit server which exploit was used to load the payload.

== Defenses ==
A typical defensive posture against this and other advanced malware includes, at a minimum, each of the following:

- Ensuring that the browser, browser's plugins, and operating system are up to date. The Blackhole exploit kit targets vulnerabilities in old versions of browsers such as Firefox, Google Chrome, Internet Explorer and Safari as well as many popular plugins such as Adobe Flash, Adobe Acrobat and Java.
- Running a security utility with a good antivirus and good host-based intrusion prevention system (HIPS). Due to the polymorphic code used in generating variants of the Blackhole exploit kit, antivirus signatures will lag behind the automated generation of new variants of the Blackhole exploit kit, while changing the algorithm used to load malware onto victims' computers takes more effort from the developers of this exploit kit. A good HIPS will defend against new variants of the Blackhole exploit kit that use previously known algorithms.

== See also ==
- Backdoor (computing)
- Botnet
- Computer virus
- Exploit
- HackTool.Win32.HackAV
- MPack (software)
- Spyware
- Trojan horse (computing)
- DarkComet – (Trojan / RAT)
