= Stegomalware =

Type of malicious software

Stegomalware is a form of malicious software that leverages steganography techniques to conceal its code, configuration data, or command-and-control (C&C) communications within seemingly benign digital media such as images, audio files, videos, documents, or network traffic. It typically embeds encrypted or obfuscated payloads into digital media and only extracts and executes them at runtime, which makes traditional signature-based and sandbox-based detection significantly more difficult. Stegomalware has been observed in attacks ranging from advanced persistent threats (APTs) to financially motivated cybercrime, and is now the subject of dedicated academic surveys, research projects, and international law-enforcement initiatives.

The key distinction between stegomalware and traditional obfuscated malware lies in the encoding location. After obfuscation, malicious code remains present within the executable and can theoretically be discovered through static analysis. In contrast, stegomalware hides the payload entirely within a cover medium (image, audio, etc.), remaining invisible until the malware dynamically extracts and executes it at runtime.

== History ==
The term stegomalware was formally introduced by researchers Águila, Laskov, and others in the context of mobile malware and presented at the Inscrypt (Information Security and Cryptology) conference in 2014. This marked the first academic formalization of the concept, though earlier work had already identified that botnets and mobile malware could use steganography and covert channels for command-and-control communication over probabilistically unobservable channels.

Since its introduction, stegomalware has evolved from a theoretical concern to a documented threat. In 2011, the APT operation known as "Operation Shady RAT" became one of the first documented cases of stegomalware in the wild, using digital images to hide Internet Protocol addresses and command-and-control server addresses. The same year, the Duqu malware (targeting industrial manufacturers) embedded victim data into JPEG image files before exfiltration, making the data transfer virtually undetectable to network-level security tools.

From 2014 onwards, stegomalware became more prevalent in organized cybercrime and advanced persistent threat campaigns. Notable examples include Zeus/Zbot, which masked configuration data in images; Gatak/Stegoloader, which hid shellcode in PNG files; TeslaCrypt, which embedded C&C commands in JPEGs; and Cerber, which concealed ransomware payloads within images. By the 2010s, stegomalware had become established as a preferred evasion technique for espionage, financial theft, and ransomware distribution campaigns.

Recent surveys (2020–2025) document that stegomalware has increasingly been exploited by adversaries targeting banks, enterprises, government agencies, educational institutions, and internet users via malvertising campaigns. The technique is now considered a sophisticated method of attack worthy of dedicated international law-enforcement attention.

== Technical Characteristics and Definitions ==
Stegomalware operates through a three-component architecture:

- Stegotext (R): An innocent-looking digital asset (image, audio file, etc.) into which the malicious payload is embedded.
- Secret key (sk): A key used by the embedding and extraction algorithms, typically hardcoded into the malware.
- Payload (p): The actual malicious code, configuration data, or C&C commands hidden within the stegotext.

The malware extracts the payload at runtime using the secret key and either executes it directly or uses it to download additional stages of the attack.

Stegomalware can be classified into several types based on deployment method:

- Type 0 (Autonomous): Both the stegotext and extraction algorithm are embedded within the malware application itself. The malicious payload is extracted and executed locally without external communication.
- Type I (Update): The stegotext and secret key are downloaded from a remote server at runtime; only the extraction algorithm is included in the malware. This variant is more flexible, allowing attackers to push updated payloads.
- Type II (External Algorithm): Neither the stegotext nor the extraction algorithm are distributed with the malware; both are fetched from an attacker-controlled infrastructure, providing maximum flexibility and evasion.

== Steganography techniques ==
=== Spatial domain methods ===
Stegomalware predominantly uses steganographic methods designed for images, as images are the most common cover medium in the wild. The most basic spatial domain technique is Least Significant Bit (LSB) substitution, which replaces the least significant bits of pixel color values with payload bits. While simple and easy to implement, LSB is also relatively easy to detect through statistical analysis.

More sophisticated spatial domain techniques include:

- HUGO (High Undetectable steGO) (2010): Minimizes detectable distortion by distributing the payload across multiple pixels, achieving embedding capacity with reduced statistical footprint.
- WOW (Wavelet Obtained Weights) (2012): Embeds data preferentially in textured regions of images where modifications are less perceptually noticeable.
- UNIWARD (Universal Wavelet Relative Distortion) (2014): Uses a universal distortion function applicable to multiple image formats, balancing payload capacity with undetectability.
- HILL (2014): Applies high-pass and low-pass filters to identify robust embedding regions.
- MiPOD (Minimizing the Power of Optimal Detector) (2016): Designed to minimize the power of theoretical optimal steganalysis detectors.

=== Transform domain methods ===
Transform domain techniques convert images into the frequency domain (e.g., using DCT or DWT) before embedding, allowing for more robust hiding in JPEG and other compressed formats:

- Embedding in DCT coefficients (used in JPEG compression)
- Embedding in DWT coefficients (used in lossless formats)
- Spread spectrum techniques, which distribute the payload across many frequency components

Transform domain methods are generally more resistant to noise, compression, and image transformations than spatial methods.

=== Generative adversarial network (GAN) methods ===
Recent advances in machine learning have introduced GAN-based steganography, where a generative model produces stego images that minimize detectable artifacts:

- SGAN (Steganographic GAN) (2017): First GAN applied to steganography, using a generator, discriminator, and steganalysis network.
- ASDL-GAN (2017): Performs automatic steganographic distortion learning at the pixel level.
- SteganoGAN (2019): Improves upon earlier GAN models, achieving higher embedding capacity and robustness.
- HiGAN (Hiding Images GAN) (2020): Enables hiding one image within another while maintaining visual plausibility.

GAN-based approaches are more resilient to standard steganalysis attacks but remain an emerging threat requiring further research.

== Notable malware campaigns ==
Stegomalware has been documented in numerous high-profile cyber attacks and campaigns. Notable examples include:

- Operation Shady RAT (2011): Used digital images to hide command-and-control server addresses in targeted espionage.
- Duqu (2011): Embedded victim data into JPEG files to exfiltrate industrial control system information.
- Zeus/Zbot (2014): Masked banking configuration data inside JPEG files exploited via malvertising.
- Gatak/Stegoloader (2015): Hid shellcode in PNG files for software licensing attacks and bot command execution.
- TeslaCrypt (2015): Embedded C&C commands and ransomware keys in JPEG images.
- Cerber (2016): Concealed executable ransomware code in JPEG files distributed via phishing.
- DNSChanger (2016): Embedded malicious code in PNG files for DNS hijacking campaigns.
- Sundown Exploit Kit (2017): Distributed exploit code in PNG files via malvertising.
- AdGholas (2017): Used JPEG steganography to distribute ransomware via malvertising.
- Synccrypt (2017): Hidden ransomware components in JPEG-steganographic encrypted archives.
- ZeroT/PlugX (2017): Hid Remote Access Trojan payloads in BMP files for espionage.
- Loki Bot (2018): Concealed malware installers in JPEG and video files.
- Waterbug (APT28) (2019): Injected malicious DLLs into WAV audio files.
- Shlayer (macOS adware) (2019): Hid malicious URLs in JPEG files via malvertising.

=== Attack vectors ===
The most common attack vectors for stegomalware include:

- Phishing emails with malicious attachments or links
- Malvertising campaigns using malicious banner advertisements
- Exploit kits through compromised or malicious websites
- Legitimate application vulnerabilities (e.g., watering-hole attacks)
- Fake software distribution (cracked software, keygen tools)

=== Exploitation stages ===
Stegomalware typically serves one or more roles in attack lifecycles:

- Payload delivery: Stego images contain full executable code or shellcode.
- C&C communication: Hidden data contains server addresses or command instructions.
- Data exfiltration: Stolen data encoded into images to evade network inspection.
- Update mechanism: New malware versions delivered via stegomalware.

== Stegomalware creation tools ==
A variety of publicly available steganography tools can be repurposed for stegomalware creation:

- Steghide (2003): Open-source; LSB-based; supports JPEG, BMP, WAV, AU formats
- OpenPuff (2004): Java-based; multi-format support (BMP, JPEG, GIF, PNG, video)
- Xiao (2006): Simple Windows GUI; basic LSB embedding in BMP and WAV
- OpenStego (2015): Open-source; user-friendly interface; supports multiple formats
- StegExpose: Detection tool; statistical analysis for finding embedded data
- Binwalk: Firmware analysis and data extraction; useful for forensics
- Aperi'Solve: Web-based steganalysis tool combining multiple detection methods

Advanced algorithms such as UNIWARD, HILL, WOW, and MiPOD require implementation from research papers rather than ready-to-use tools.

== Detection and steganalysis ==
Detecting stegomalware is challenging because modifications are designed to be statistically invisible. Traditional antivirus solutions struggle since they primarily analyze executable files and network traffic, not embedded multimedia.

=== Steganalysis methods ===
Steganalysis encompasses several detection approaches:

- Visual steganalysis: Human inspection for anomalies (rarely effective for modern techniques)
- Statistical steganalysis: Analysis of pixel distributions and histograms
- Signature-based steganalysis: Matching known tool signatures or patterns
- Rich model steganalysis: Domain-specific feature extraction with ensemble classifiers
- Deep learning-based steganalysis: Convolutional neural networks to distinguish natural from stego images
- Universal (blind) steganalysis: General-purpose detection regardless of embedding algorithm

=== Detection performance ===
Modern CNN models (SRNet, GBRAS-Net, SFNet) achieve detection accuracies between 75 and 85 percent against state-of-the-art steganography algorithms at typical embedding rates. However, performance degrades with:

- Very low embedding rates
- Adversarial training or GAN-based steganography
- Mixed file formats in datasets
- Encrypted payloads

=== Enterprise detection frameworks ===
Enterprise-scale stegomalware detection requires multiple security layers:

- File-level analysis: Scanning for steganography signatures using tools like StegExpose or binwalk
- Dynamic behavior analysis: Using sandboxes to observe payload extraction and execution
- Network monitoring: Detecting suspicious patterns in traffic indicating exfiltration
- Machine learning models: Deploying trained classifiers to identify stego images

Detection frameworks have been proposed for datacenters, cloud (AWS, Azure), and multi-cloud environments.

== International law enforcement and research initiatives ==
=== Criminal Use of Information Hiding (CUIng) Initiative ===
The Criminal Use of Information Hiding (CUIng) initiative was established in June 2016 by the Europol European Cybercrime Centre (EC3), academic institutions, and industry partners. CUIng brings together over 90 members from 30 countries, including Bank of Ireland, Vodafone, and Trend Micro.

CUIng's objectives include:

- Raising awareness among law enforcement and the public about steganography threats
- Sharing threat intelligence on information hiding misuse
- Tracking emerging steganographic techniques in cybercrime
- Training law enforcement and forensic professionals
- Supporting investigations involving steganography

CUIng's threat assessment identified steganography in diverse crimes including child sexual abuse material (CSAM), industrial espionage, enterprise cyberattacks, credit card fraud, and backdoor injection.

=== SIMARGL project ===
The SIMARGL (Secure Intelligent Methods for Advanced RecoGnition of malware and stegomalware) project, funded by Horizon 2020, developed an integrated platform for detecting traditional malware and stegomalware in production environments. The project created machine learning models to identify malicious images in real-world network traffic and endpoint storage.

=== UNCOVER project ===
The UNCOVER project (2021–2024), an EU-funded Horizon 2020 action, developed a comprehensive steganalysis framework for law enforcement agencies and forensic institutes. UNCOVER integrated:

- Analysis and cataloging of existing steganographic tools
- Development and validation of state-of-the-art steganalysis detectors
- Creation of a unified online platform for forensic analysis
- Field validation with law enforcement use cases
- Training and capacity building for agencies and institutes
- Legal frameworks for court admissibility across European jurisdictions

UNCOVER demonstrated that operational steganalysis improves with metadata or partial information about the original media, such as JPEG steganalysis using leaked cover thumbnails.

== Research challenges and future directions ==
Despite advances in detection, several critical challenges remain:

- Limited public datasets: Only the proprietary MalJPEG dataset (157,000 samples) exists; inaccessible to researchers.
- Lack of real-payload evaluation: Most research uses generic steganographic images, not actual malware-embedded images.
- Adversarial robustness: Attackers use adversarial training and GANs to evade detectors.
- Multi-format detection: Methods specialize in single formats (JPEG) and struggle with mixed datasets.
- Audio/video steganography: Limited research on detecting steganography in WAV, MP3, and video files.
- Stegomalware in neural networks: Emerging threat of embedding payloads in pre-trained deep learning model weights.
- Scalability in enterprises: Large-scale deployment introduces computational and false-positive challenges.
- Emerging techniques: Novel GAN-based and context-aware steganography may outpace detection.

Future research priorities include:

- Developing public stegomalware datasets and benchmarks
- Evaluating detectors against real malware payloads
- Cross-domain and cross-format steganalysis methods
- Integrating cryptanalysis with steganographic detection
- Harmonizing legal frameworks for cross-border investigations

== Impact and Significance ==
Stegomalware represents a sophisticated evolution in malware design. Unlike traditional obfuscation, which leaves code accessible to static analysis, stegomalware hides payloads entirely within cover media until runtime execution, defeating static analysis.

The documented rise in real-world stegomalware attacks—from advanced persistent threats to financial cybercrime—demonstrates active threat growth. International law enforcement and academic focus (CUIng, SIMARGL, UNCOVER) reflects recognition that stegomalware poses a significant security challenge for enterprises, governments, and users.

Despite advances in steganalysis, detection rates remain insufficient for production environments, and attacker evasion techniques continue improving. As steganography tools become more accessible and sophisticated, stegomalware is expected to become increasingly common in advanced cyberattacks.
