= The Diana Initiative =

Computer security conference in Las Vegas (since 2017)

The Diana Initiative is a computer security conference based in Las Vegas, Nevada aimed at supporting underrepresented minorities including women in cybersecurity. The first Diana Initiative conference took place in 2017. The Diana Initiative was founded by Cheryl Biswas, Virginie Robbins, Pablo Breuer, Elizabeth Etherington and Michael Smith. Due to COVID-19, the 2022 conference will be held 10–11 August during DEF CON.
