= Ekoparty =

Computer security conference

Ekoparty logo

The Ekoparty is an annual computer security conference that brings together a variety of people interested in information security. The Briefings take place regularly in Buenos Aires, Argentina.

== History ==
Ekoparty was founded in 2001 by Juan Pablo Daniel Borgna, Leonardo Pigner, Federico Kirschbaum, Jerónimo Basaldúa and Francisco Müller Amato. In addition to the talks, Ekoparty has different activities like workshops, wargames, Wardriving, Lockpicking challenges, and forensics challenges.

== See also ==
- Hacker conference
- DEF CON
- Black Hat Briefings
- Chaos Communication Congress
