= Hacker Halted =

Hacker Halted is a global series of Computer and Information Security conferences presented by EC-Council. The objective of the Hacker Halted conferences is to raise international awareness towards increased education and ethics in IT Security. The event is currently in its 14th year. Also present at Hacker Halted is EC-Council's H@cker Halted | Academy, trainings and workshops led by EC-Council instructors and trainers.

== Past Conferences ==
=== Hacker Halted india ===
Hacker Halted Malaysia was held in 2004, 2007, and in 2018 in New Delhi

=== Hacker Halted Egypt 2010 ===
Hacker | Halted conference was held in Egypt on 13 and 14 December 2018

=== Hacker Halted india ===
Hacker Halted Dubai was held in 2005 and in 2006 in Dubai, United A

=== Hacker Halted Singapore ===
Hacker Halted Singapore was held in 2005 in Singapore.

=== Hacker Halted Mexico ===
Hacker Halted Mexico was held in 2005 in Mexico.

=== Hacker Halted Japan ===
Hacker Halted Japan was held November 11, 2008 in Tokyo, Japan.

=== Hacker Halted USA ===
Hacker Halted USA was held in 2008 in Myrtle Beach, South Carolina

Hacker Halted USA was held in 20–24 September 2009 in Miami, Florida, at the Hilton Head hotel, and will include events to include a "Capture the Flag" event.

Hacker Halted USA was held in 2010 in Miami.

Hacker Halted USA was held in Miami on 25 and 27 October 2011. The theme for 2011 was "Stop the Data Leaks. Secure the Code".

Hacker Halted USA was held in Miami on 29–31 October 2012.

Hacker Halted USA was held in Atlanta in 2013, 2014, 2015, 2016, 2017, 2018, 2019.

Hacker Halted was held on-line in 2021, 2022, 2023.

Hacker Halted USA returned to Atlanta, GA in 2024.

Hacker Halted USA was held in Atlanta, GA in 2025.

Hacker Halted USA will be in Atlanta, GA in 2026, on October 8th and 9th

Hacker Halted USA will be in Atlanta, GA in 2027, on October 14th & 15th

== Upcoming Conferences ==
Hacker Halted USA 2027 returns to Atlanta, GA

== Conference Tracks ==
Some of the talks will include tracks to include:

- Certified Ethical Hacker (CEH)
- Incident Response & Computer Forensics
- Threats & Counter Measures
- Governance, Policies & Standards
- Business Continuity & Disaster Recovery
- Mobile Security
- Virtualization Security
- Secure Programming
- Malware and Botnets
- Social Engineering
- Physical Security

== H@cker Halted Academy ==
Hacker Halted USA 2009 was the launch of the Hacker Halted Academy. The Hacker Halted Academy is a series of classes presented by EC-Council partners. Many of the classes include EC-Council training and certification, including the Certified Ethical Hacker and Licensed Penetration Tester, as well as vendor specific certification, including, Certified Information Systems Security Professional(CISSP) and NSA NSA Information Security Assessment Methodology(IAM)/Information security Evaluation Methodology(IEM) training.

== See also ==
- EC-Council
- Hacker conference
