= DerbyCon =

Computer security conference based in Louisville, Kentucky

DerbyCon was a computer security conference based in Louisville, Kentucky. The first DerbyCon took place in 2011 and was founded by Martin Bos, Dave Kennedy, Alex Kah and Adrian Crenshaw. The conference has been held at the Hyatt Regency Louisville typically in late September.

On January 14, 2019, organizers announced that DerbyCon 9.0, to be held in September 2019, would be the last of the series, citing the increasing difficulty of holding conferences in the face of "a small, yet vocal group of people creating negativity, polarization, and disruption".

== Events ==
DerbyCon common activities included:

- Presentations from keynote speakers, with topics including software security, social engineering, cyber security, security in the present day and future, and mobile applications.
- Preconference training
- Vendors and publishers
- Lockpick Village
- Mental Health & Wellness Village
- BourbonCon, a social gathering during DerbyCon focusing on sampling fine Kentucky Bourbon
- DerbyCon Party, which has featured The Crystal Method (2013, 2015) and Infected Mushroom (2014)

== Conferences ==
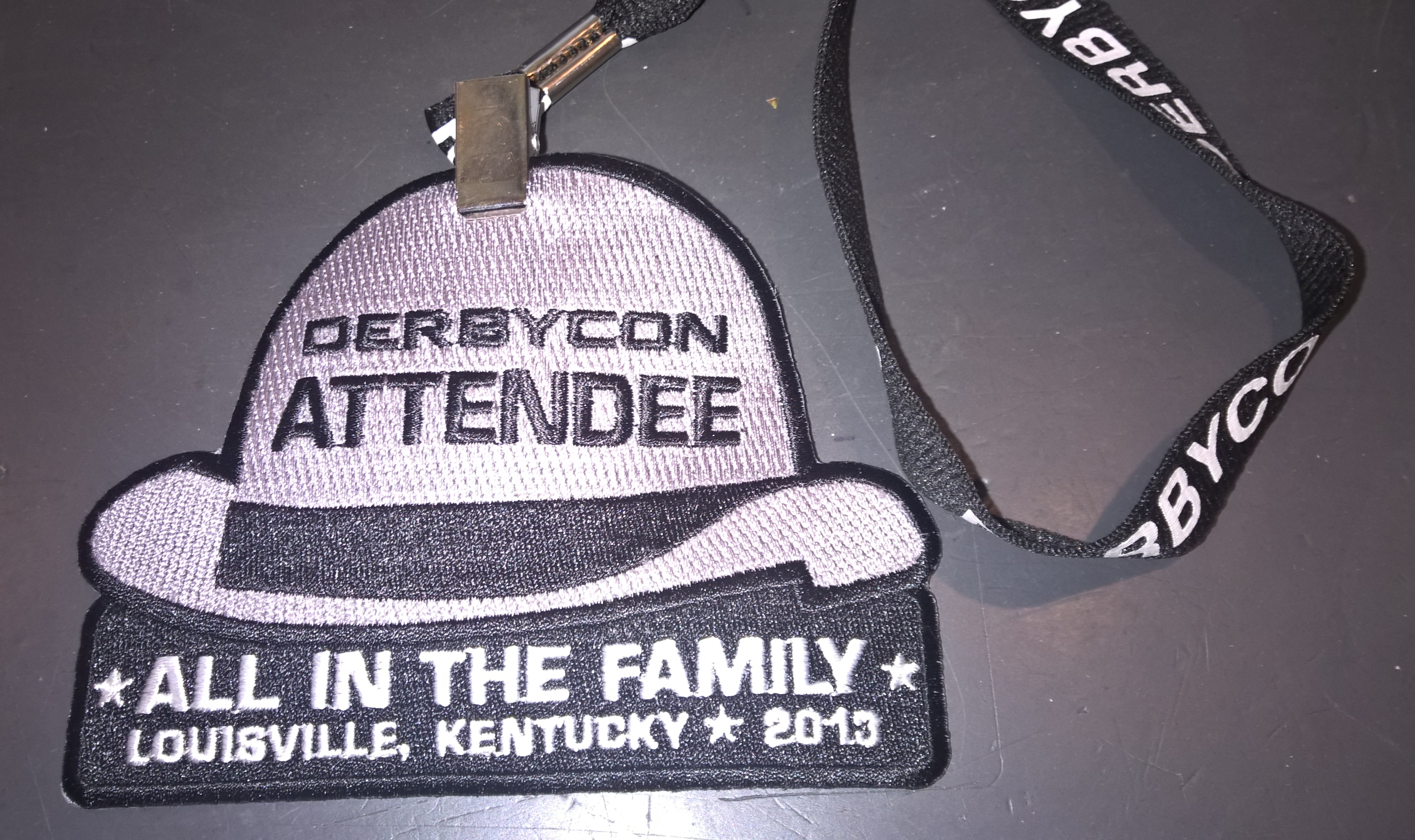
DerbyCon 2013 Attendee Badge

- DerbyCon 1.0 September 30 – October 2, 2011 at the Hyatt Regency in Louisville, Kentucky
- DerbyCon 2.0 "Reunion" September 27–30, 2012 at the Hyatt Regency in Louisville, Kentucky
- DerbyCon 3.0 "All in the Family" September 27–30, 2013 at the Hyatt Regency in Louisville, Kentucky
- DerbyCon 4.0 "Family Rootz" September 24–28, 2014 at the Hyatt Regency in Louisville, Kentucky
- DerbyCon 5.0 "Unity" September 23–27, 2015 at the Hyatt Regency in Louisville, Kentucky
- DerbyCon 6.0 "Recharge" September 21–25, 2016 at the Hyatt Regency in Louisville, Kentucky
- DerbyCon 7.0 "Legacy" September 20–24, 2017 at the Hyatt Regency in Louisville, Kentucky
- DerbyCon 8.0 "Evolution" October 3–7, 2018 at the Marriott in Louisville, Kentucky
- DerbyCon 9.0 "Finish Line" September 4–8, 2019 at the Marriott in Louisville, Kentucky
