= International Conference on Information Systems Security and Privacy =

The International Conference on Information Systems Security and Privacy – ICISSP – aims to create a meeting point for practitioners and researchers interested in security and privacy challenges that concern information systems covering technological and social issues.

The format of the conference counts on technical sessions, poster sessions, tutorials, doctoral consortiums, panels, industrial tracks and keynote lectures. The papers presented in the conference are made available at the SCITEPRESS digital library, published in the conference proceedings and some of the best papers are invited to a post-publication with Springer, in a CCIS Series book.

ICISSP also counts on keynote talks. Some of the invited speakers announced in the previous editions of the conference were: Ross J. Anderson (University of Cambridge, UK), Elisa Bertino (Purdue University, USA), Bart Preneel (KU Leuven, Belgium), Jason Hong (Carnegie Mellon University, USA) and Steven Furnell (University of Plymouth, UK).

== Conference topics ==
- Access and Usage Control
- Risk and Reputation Management
- Security and Privacy in Cloud and Pervasive Computing
- Authentication, Privacy and Security Models
- Security Architecture and Design Analysis
- Security Awareness and Education
- Security Frameworks, Architectures and Protocols
- Security Testing
- Software Security Assurance
- Threat Awareness
- Vulnerability Analysis and Countermeasures
- Information Hiding and Anonymity
- Web Applications and Services
- Biometric Technologies and Applications
- Content Protection and Digital Rights Management
- Cryptographic Algorithms
- Data and Software Security
- Data Mining and Knowledge Discovery
- Database Security
- Identity and Trust management
- Trusted Computing
- Intrusion Detection and Response
- Legal and Regulatory Issues
- Malware Detection
- Mobile Systems Security
- Privacy Metrics and Control
- Privacy, Security and Trust in Social Media
- Privacy-Enhancing Models and Technologies
- Security in IoT and Edge Computing
- Distributed Ledgers and Blockchain Technologies and Applications
- AI and Machine Learning for Security

== Editions and proceedings ==
=== ICISSP 2020 – Valletta, Malta ===
Proceedings of the 6th International Conference on Information Systems Security and Privacy. ISBN 978-989-758-359-9

=== ICISSP 2019 – Prague, Czech Republic ===
Proceedings of the 5th International Conference on Information Systems Security and Privacy. ISBN 978-989-758-081-9

Best Paper Award – Dayana Spagnuelo, Ana Ferreira and Gabriele Lenzini, “Accomplishing Transparency within the General Data Protection Regulation”

Best Student Paper Award - Maja Nyman and Christine Große, “Are You Ready When It Counts? IT Consulting Firm’s Information Security Incident Management”

=== ICISSP 2018 – Funchal, Madeira, Portugal ===
Proceedings of the 4th International Conference on Information Systems Security and Privacy. ISBN 978-989-758-282-0

Best Paper Award – Wei-Han Lee, Jorge Ortiz, Bongjun Ko and Ruby Lee, “Inferring Smartphone Users’ Handwritten Patterns by using Motion Sensors”

Best Student Paper Award - Vincent Haupert and Tilo Müller, “On App-based Matrix Code Authentication in Online Banking”

=== ICISSP 2017 – Porto, Portugal ===
Proceedings of the 3rd International Conference on Information Systems Security and Privacy. ISBN 978-989-758-209-7

Best Paper Award – Lake Bu and Mark G. Karpovsky, “A Design of Secure and ReliableWireless Transmission Channel for Implantable Medical Devices”

Best Student Paper Award - Iman Sedeeq, Frans Coenen and Alexei Lisitsa, “Attribute Permutation Steganography Detection using Attribute Position Changes Count”

=== ICISSP 2016 – Rome, Italy ===
Proceedings of the 2nd International Conference on Information Systems Security and Privacy. ISBN 978-989-758-167-0

Best Paper Award – Christoph Kerschbaumer, Sid Stamm and Stefan Brunthaler. “Injecting CSP for Fun and Security”

Best Student Paper Award - Kexin Qiao, Lei Hu and Siwei Sun, “Differential Security Evaluation of Simeck with Dynamic Key-guessing Techniques”

=== ICISSP 2015 – ESEO, Angers, Loire Valley, France ===
Proceedings of the 1st International Conference on Information Systems Security and Privacy . ISBN 978-989-758-081-9

Best Paper Award - Fabian Knirsch, Dominik Engel, Christian Neureiter, Marc Frincu and Viktor Prasanna. "Model-driven Privacy Assessment in the Smart Grid"

Best Student Paper Award - Carsten Büttner and Sorin A. Huss. "A Novel Anonymous Authenticated Key Agreement Protocol for Vehicular Ad Hoc Networks"
