= MalCon =

International IT security conference

International Malware Conference

The International Malware Conference, abbreviated as MalCon and stylized as MALCON is a computer security conference targeted on the development of malware.

== Announcements ==
Some new announcements made at MalCon include malware that can share USB smart card reader data, Windows Phone 8 malware, security problems with counterfeit phones and the AirHopper attack.

== See also ==
- DEF CON
- Chaos Communication Congress
