= Neuronal Alpha-Synuclein Disease =

Neurodegenerative disorder

Neuronal Alpha-Synuclein Disease (NSD) is a proposed new combined definition of Parkinson's disease and Dementia with Lewy bodies based on biology instead of symptomatology.
