= Hack.lu =

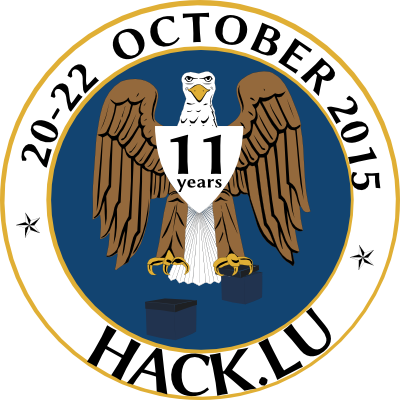
- Founded: 2005
- Locations: Luxembourg

hack.lu (also written as HACKLU) is a yearly computer security conference held in Luxembourg that brings together a variety of people interested in information security. It's organized by the Computer Incident Response Center Luxembourg (CIRCL), the country's CERT for the private sector, communes and non-governmental entities.

== History ==
The first conference was organized in 2005, and held its 10th edition in 2014. In the scope of European information security conferences, hack.lu is one of the oldest conferences running.

== Content and organisation ==
Where other conferences often provide day-long training sessions, Hack.lu chooses a different model by filling its first few days with workshops, enforcing a strong focus on practical things. The aim of the convention is to make a bridge of the various actors in the computer security world, by discussing and presenting on topics like computer security, privacy, information technology and its cultural/technical implication on society.

== CTF ==
Since the first conference, a capture the flag event has been organized. In recent years FluxFingers from Ruhr-University Bochum are the event organizers, for the 5th time in 2014. The event usually lasts 48h, with the possibility to participate remotely. But only teams who have one person physically present will be able to claim for prize. More than 400 people participated in 2013.
