= Irish American Heritage Center =

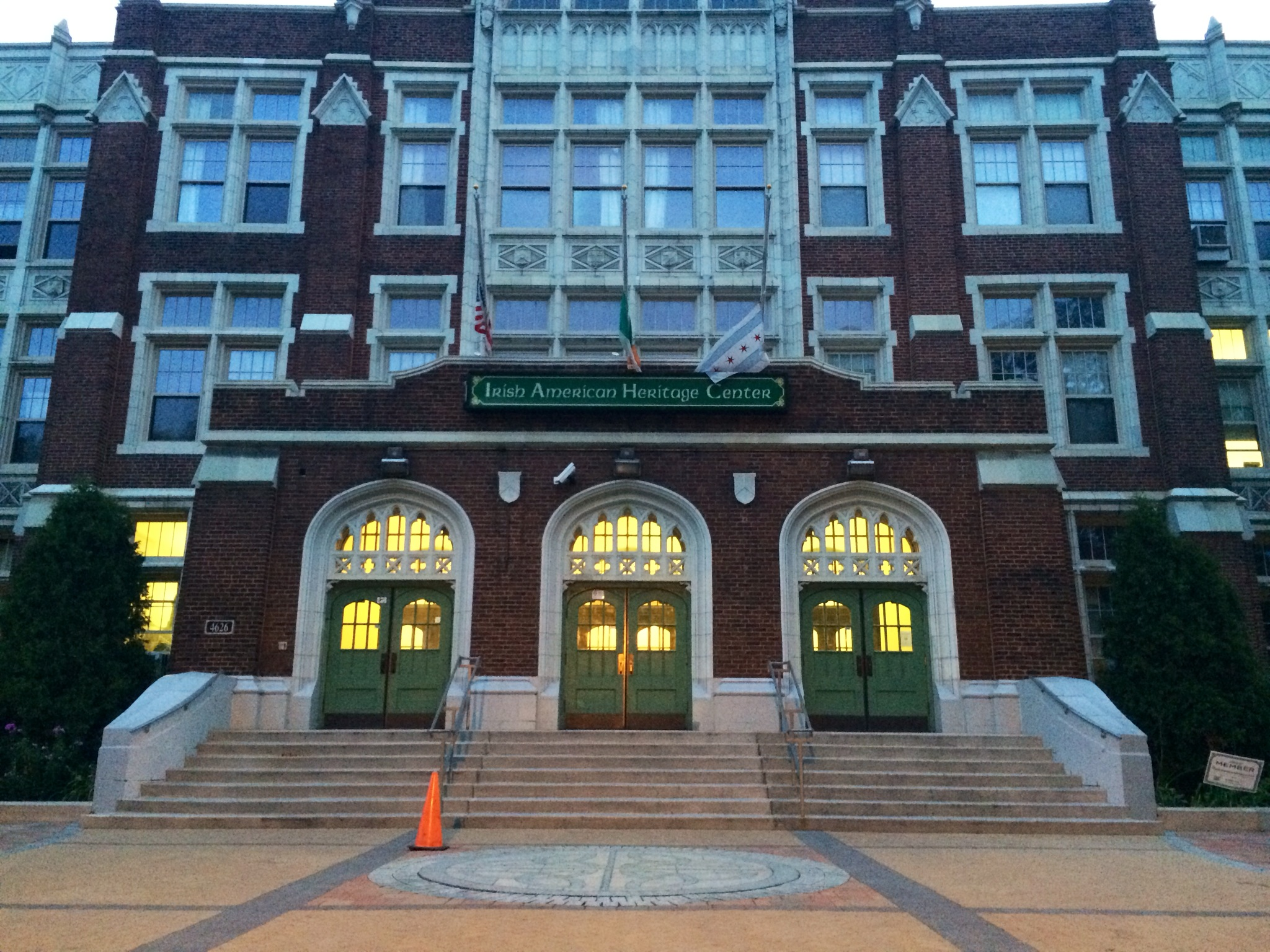
- Irish American Heritage Center in the Mayfair neighborhood, Chicago, IL
- Established: 1976
- Location: 4626 N. Knox Ave. Chicago, Illinois
- Type: Irish cultural center
- President: Michael Shevlin
- Website: http://irish-american.org

The Irish American Heritage Center (Irish: Ionad na Oidhreachtas Éire-Mheiriceánach) is a non-profit organization located in Chicago that seeks to enhance the study of Irish culture with programming centered on Irish dance, literature, heritage, music, and Irish American cultural contributions to the United States. The center also supports Irish immigrants, and three Presidents of Ireland have attended ceremonies at the center.

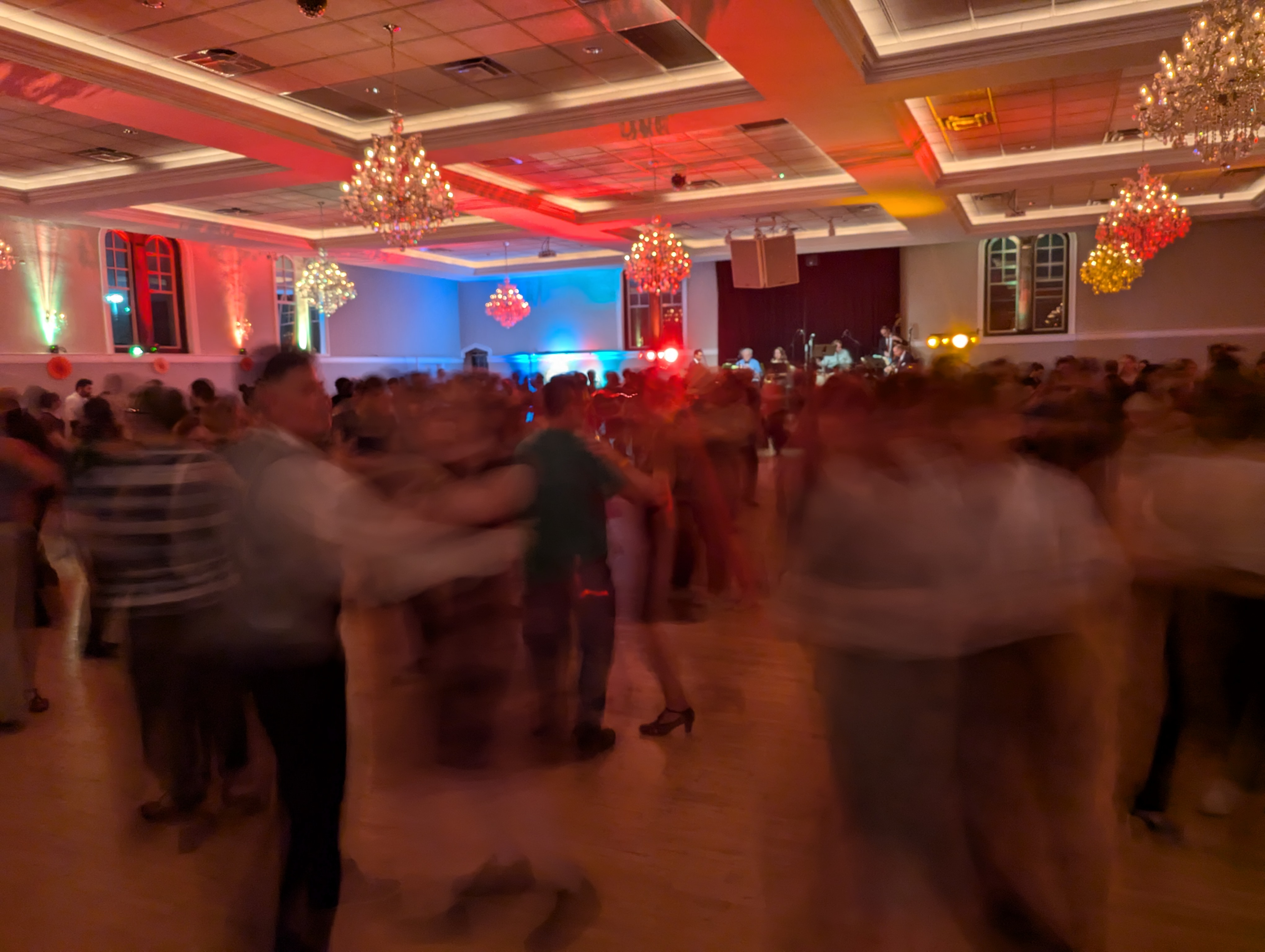
A Balboa dance event at the center in 2024

The center's building in the Mayfair neighborhood of Chicago houses a library, museum, art gallery, archives, auditorium and classrooms, as well as an Irish pub and gift shop. Founded in 1976, it opened its building in 1985. The center oversees and administers the Irish American Hall of Fame. It is a member organization of the Chicago Cultural Alliance.
