= Henrik Brodersen =

Danish politician

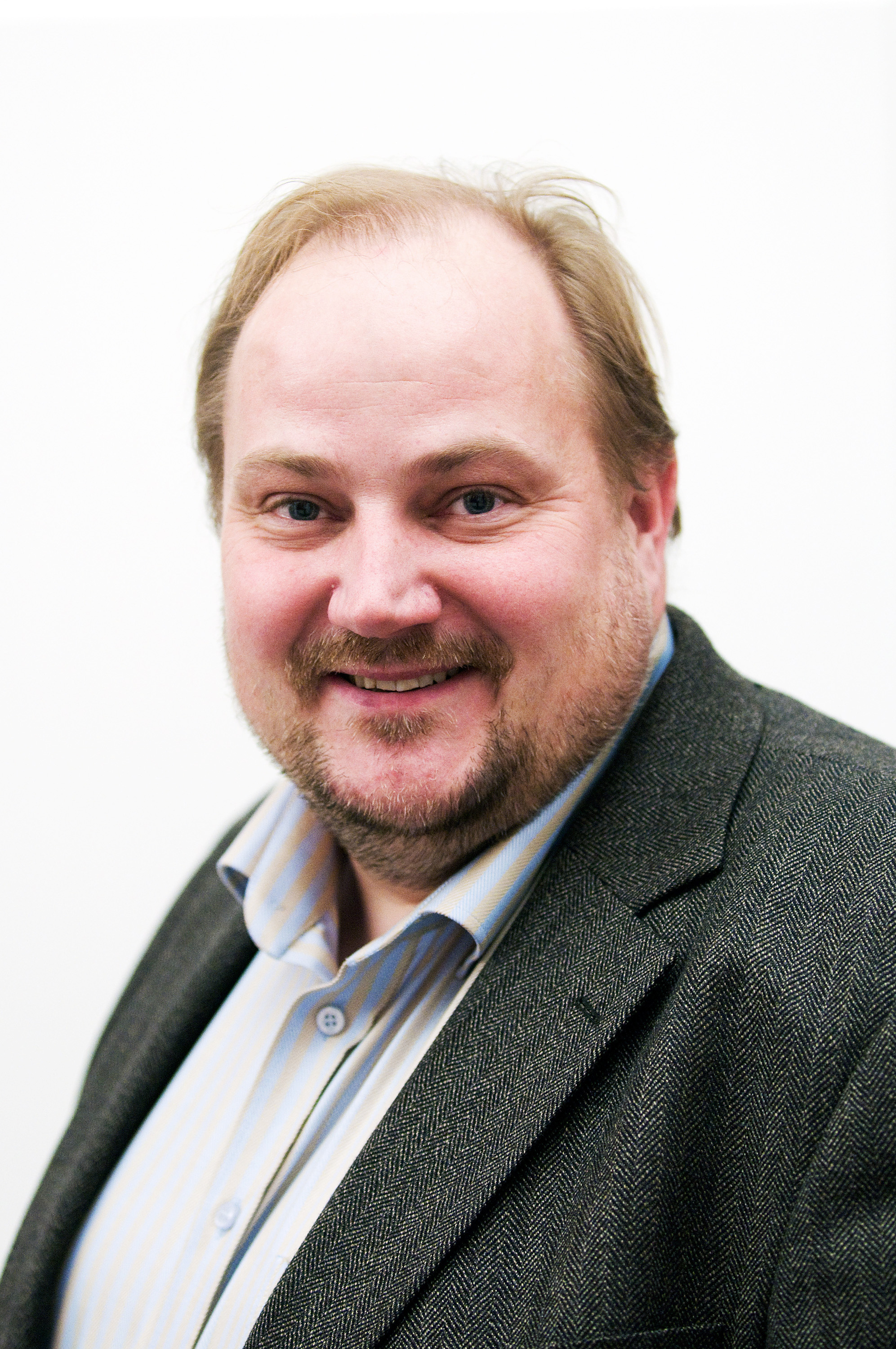

Member of the Folketing
- In office 18 June 2015 – 5 June 2019
- Constituency: Zealand
- In office 13 November 2007 – 15 September 2011
- Constituency: Zealand

Personal details
- Born: 3 June 1964 (age 62) Skælskør, Denmark
- Party: Danish People's Party

Henrik Urban Brodersen (born 3 June 1964 in Skælskør) is a Danish politician, who was a member of the Folketing for the Danish People's Party from 2007 to 2011 and again from 2015 to 2019.

== Political career ==
Brodersen sat in the municipal council of Skælskør Municipality from 2002 to 2006, where the municipality was merged with Slagelse, Hashøj and Korsør Municipality to form a new Slagelse Municipality. Brodersen has been in the new Slagelse Municipality's municipal council since its foundation in 2007. From 2014 to 2015 he sat in the regional council of Region Zealand.

Brodersen first entered parliament as a substitute member three times during the 2005–2007 term: from 1 March to 16 June 2005, 27 October to 4 November 2005 and 13 March to 28 May 2007. At the 2007 Danish general election he was elected into parliament on his own mandate. He was not reelected in 2011, but was elected back in at the 2015 election. He was not reelected at the 2019 election.

On November 23, 2025, Henrik Brodersen was expected to become mayor of Slagelse Municipality, but shortly before the constituent city council meeting where the mayor would be appointed, incumbent mayor Knud Vincent gathered enough support to retain the mayor's position.
