= Slagelse Municipality (1970–2006) =

Slagelse Municipality Slagelse Kommune
- Former municipality
- Coat of arms

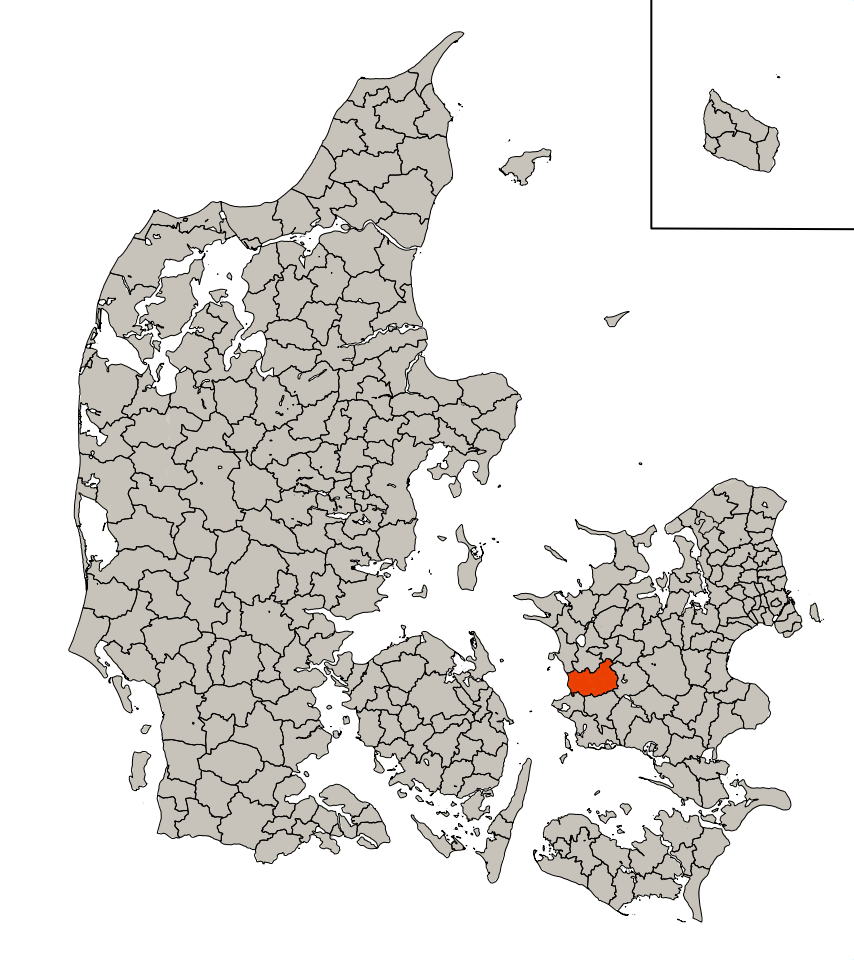
- Country: Denmark
- County: West Zealand
- Established: April 1, 1970
- Dissolved: December 31, 2006
- Seat: Slagelse

Government
  - Last mayor: Lis Tribler (A)

Area
  - Total: 192.00 km^{2} (74.13 sq mi)

Population (2006)
  - Total: 37,141
  - Density: 193.44/km^{2} (501.01/sq mi)
- Time zone: UTC1 (CET)
  - Summer (DST): UTC2 (CEST)
- Municipal code: 333

Until January 1, 2007 Slagelse Municipality was a municipality (Danish: kommune) in the former West Zealand County, on the southwestern coast of the island of Zealand, in eastern Denmark. The municipality covered an area of 192.00 km^{2}, and had a total population of 37,141 (2006). Its last mayor was Lis Tribler, a member of the Social Democrats.

Slagelse Municipality bordered Korsør Municipality and Hashøj Municipality to the south and Sorø Municipality to the east. To the north, the municipality bordered Dianalund Municipality, Høng Municipality and Gørlev Municipality. To the west it bordered the Great Belt.

The municipality ceased to exist as the result of Kommunalreformen 2007 (the Municipality Reform of 2007). It was merged with Hashøj, Korsør and Skælskør municipalities to form a new Slagelse municipality. The new municipality belongs to Region Zealand.

== History ==
Slagelse has existed since the 1000s, and coins have been minted there since Cnut the Great's time. It was granted the status of market town by Eric V in 1288. Slagelse was an important location even before becoming a market town, with the ring castle of Trelleborg located next to the town. Slagelse's economy was mainly based on artisanry and tobacco.

In the Middle Ages, when Denmark was divided into hundreds, the area of Slagelse Municipality was under Slagelse Hundred. Slagelse Hundred came under Korsør County when it was established in 1662. It merged with Sorø County and Antvorskov County in 1798 to form a new Sorø County. This county lasted until the 1970 Danish Municipal Reform where it merged with Holbæk County to create West Zealand County (Danish: Vestsjællands Amt). After the 2007 municipal reform this changed to Region Zealand.

From 1842, where parish municipalities were created, and until 1966 the area of Slagelse Municipality consisted of nine parish municipalities. Four of them were merged in 1966 to form Vestermose Parish Municipality. From 1875 and until 1970 the market town of Slagelse was a market town municipality. The parish municipalities and the market town municipality were merged in the 1970 Danish Municipal Reform to form Slagelse Municipality.

In the Municipality Reform of 2007 Slagelse Municipality was merged with Skælskør, Hashøj and Korsør Municipality to form a new Slagelse Municipality.

=== Historical divisions ===
Historical municipal divisions of Slagelse Municipality
2007	1970	1966	1875	1843	1842	1288	Towns
Slagelse Mun.	Slagelse Mun.	Slagelse Market Town Mun.		Slagelse Market Town			Slagelse
Slagelse Mun.	Slagelse Mun.	St. Michael's Rural Parish Mun.					Slagelse
Slagelse Mun.	Slagelse Mun.	St. Peter's Rural Parish Mun.					Slagelse
Slagelse Mun.	Slagelse Mun.	Havrebjerg Parish Mun.					Havrebjerg
Slagelse Mun.	Slagelse Mun.	Stillinge Parish Mun.					Kirke Stillinge
Slagelse Mun.	Slagelse Mun.	Stillinge Parish Mun.					Stillinge Strand
Slagelse Mun.	Slagelse Mun.	Stillinge Parish Mun.					Kongsmark Strand
Slagelse Mun.	Slagelse Mun.	Hejninge Parish Mun.					Hejninge
Slagelse Mun.	Slagelse Mun.	Vestermose Parish Mun.	Sønderup-Nordrupvester Parish Mun.				Sønderup
Slagelse Mun.	Slagelse Mun.	Vestermose Parish Mun.	Gudum Parish Mun.				Gudum
Slagelse Mun.	Slagelse Mun.	Vestermose Parish Mun.	Sorterup-Ottestrup Parish Mun.				Ottestrup
Slagelse Mun.	Slagelse Mun.	Vestermose Parish Mun.	Kindertofte Parish Mun.		Pedersborg-Kindertofte Parish Mun. (Note: Also part of today's Sorø Municipality.)		Kindertofte
Slagelse Mun.	Skælskør Mun.						
Slagelse Mun.	Hashøj Mun.						
Slagelse Mun.	Korsør Mun.						

=== Mayors ===
Since the creation of the municipality in 1970 and until it was dissolved in 2007, the mayors of Slagelse Municipality were:

#	Mayor	Party	Term
1	Aage Nørgaard	Social Democrats	1970-1986
2	Steen Bach Nielen	Social Democrats	1986-1994
3	Jens Jørgensen	Conservative People's Party	1994-1998
4	Lis Tribler	Social Democrats	1998-2007

== Towns ==
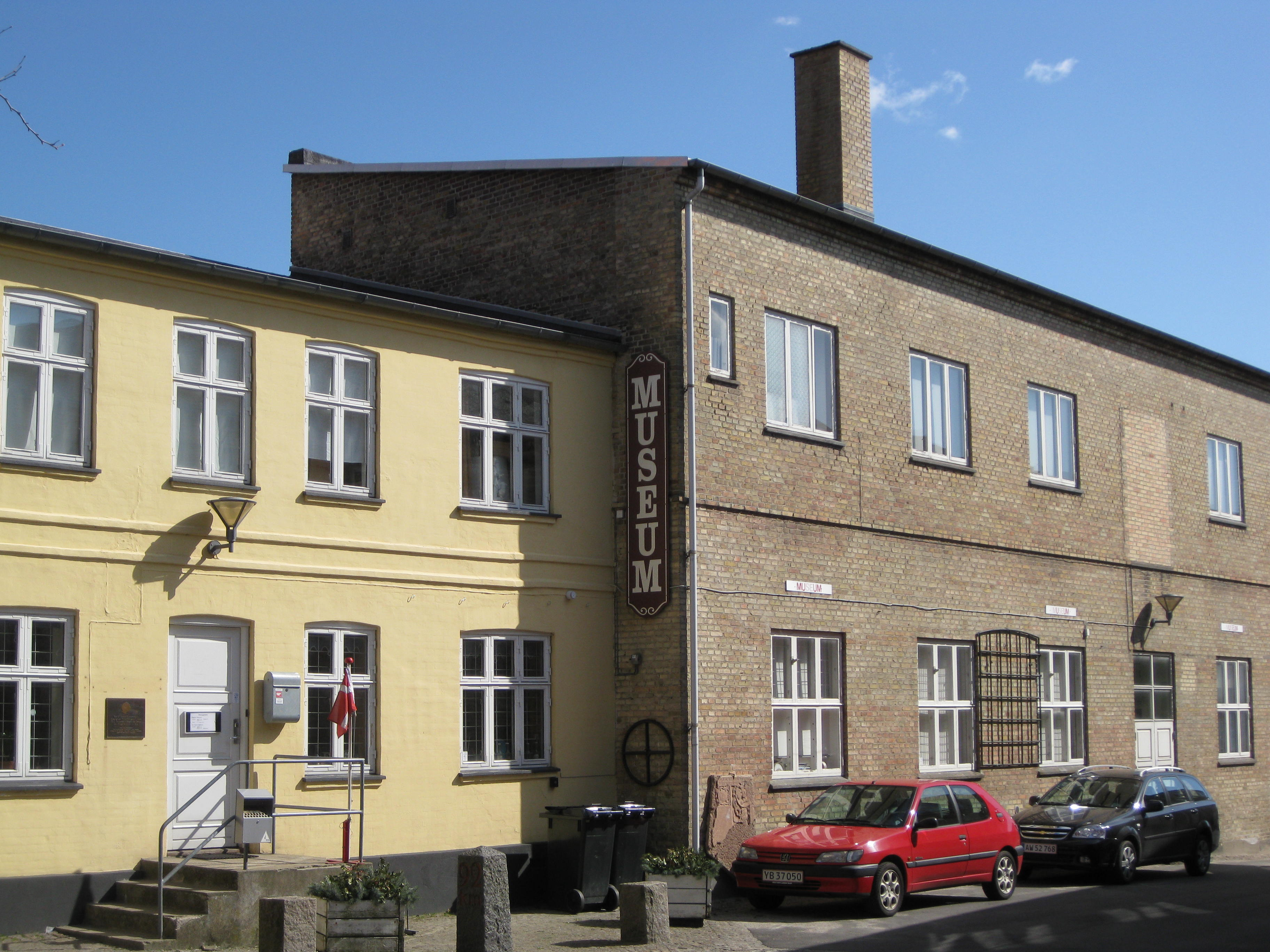
Slagelse Museum

The largest town in the municipality was by far Slagelse. Approximately 85% of the municipality's population lived in Slagelse. Of the remaining population, approximately 10% lived in rural areas. The last 5% lived in the towns of Havrebjerg and Kirke Stillinge. Notable smaller villages in the municipality included Stillinge Strand and Kongsmark Strand.

Slagelse was located in the southern part of the municipality. The local museum, Slagelse Museum, was established in 1978. The museum has a focus on trade, artisanry and local history. Slagelse Station was built in 1892.

Below are the populations from 2006 of the three larger settlements of the municipality.

Slagelse	31,778
Kirke Stillinge	505
Havrebjerg	391

== Politics ==
=== Municipal council ===
Below are the municipal council elected from the municipality's creation in 1970 and until 2001, which was the last election before the municipality was dissolved.

Election	Party										Total seats	Elected mayor
Election	A	B	C	D	F	K	O	V	Z	...	Total seats	Elected mayor
1970	10	1	3			1		5		1	21	Aage Nørgaard (A)
1974	8	1	2	1		3		4	2		21	Aage Nørgaard (A)
1978	10		3			3		3	2		21	Aage Nørgaard (A)
1981	9	1	4		1	2		3	1		21	Aage Nørgaard (A)
1985	9		7		2	1		2			21	Steen Bach Nielen (A)
1989	8		6		2			2	1	2	21	Steen Bach Nielen (A)
1993	8		8		1			4			21	Jens Jørgensen (C)
1997	10		6		1		1	3			21	Lis Tribler (A)
2001	9		2		1		2	4		3	21	Lis Tribler (A)
Data from Statistikbanken.dk and editions of Kommunal Aarbog

== Parishes ==
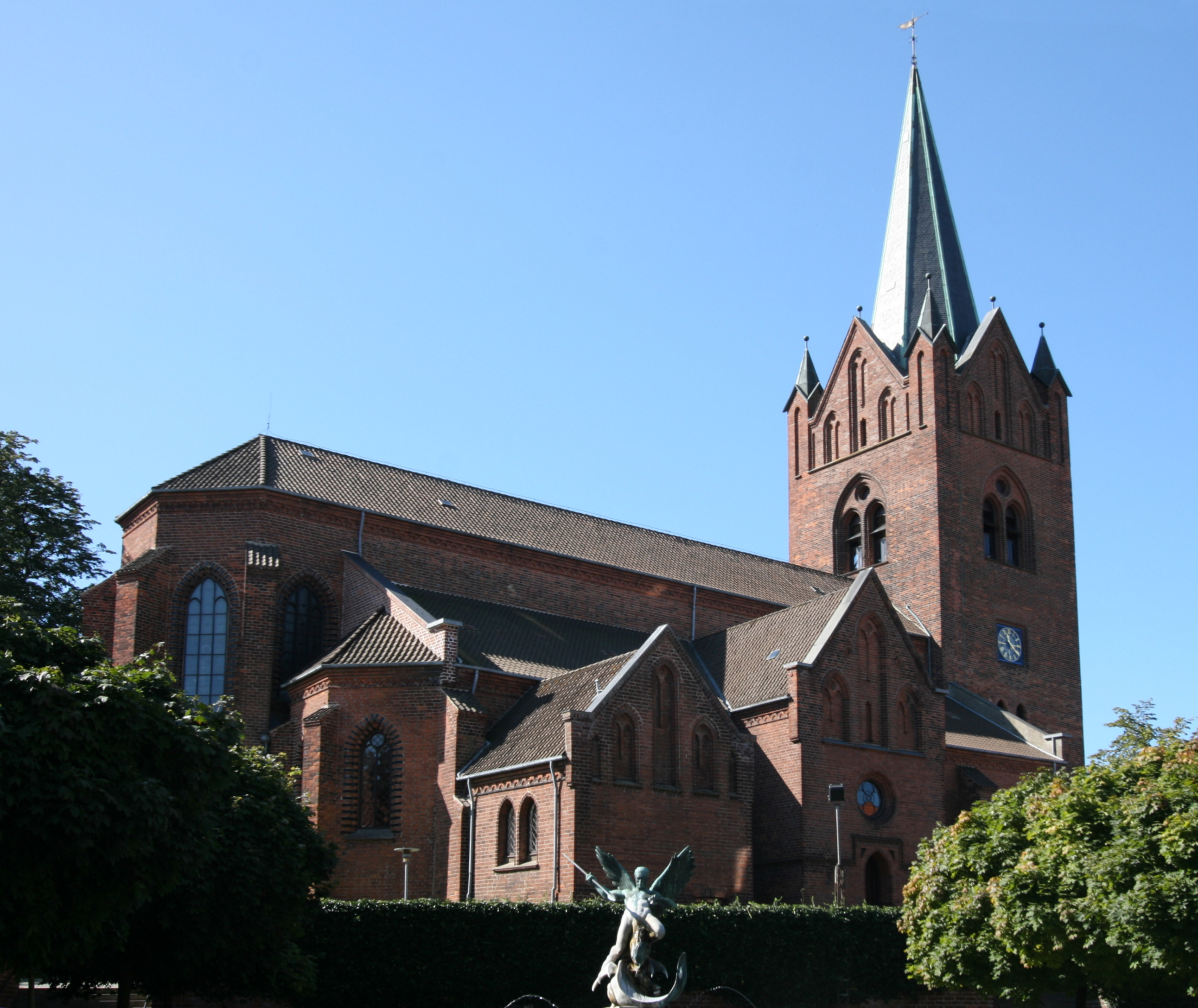
Saint Michael's Church

The municipality consisted of thirteen parishes and fourteen churches.

- Antvorskov Parish (Antvorskov Church)
- Gudum Parish (Gudum Church)
- Havrebjerg Parish (Havrebjerg Church)
- Hejninge Parish (Hejninge Church)
- Kindertofte Parish (Kindertofte Church)
- Nordrupvester Parish (Nordrupvester Church)
- Nørrevang Parish (Nørrevang Church)
- Ottestrup Parish (Ottestrup Church)
- Saint Michael's Parish (Saint Peter's Church)
- Saint Peter's Parish (Saint Peter's Church, Holy Spirit Church)
- Sorterup Parish (Sorterup Church)
- Kirke Stillinge Parish (Stillinge Church)
- Sønderup Parish (Sønderup Church)

== Symbols ==
Coat of arms of Slagelse Municipality

The coat of arms of Slagelse Municipality was the same as that of the town of Slagelse. It features the town's patron Saint Michael with the dragon, which is coloured green. He holds a white shield with a red cross. He is wearing a blue robe and white spear. His wings are white, as are the two towers on either side of him. The two towers represent the two churches in the town. The background is red.
