= Lis Tribler =

Danish politician

Mayor of Slagelse Municipality
- In office 1 January 2007 – 31 December 2013
- Preceded by: None
- Succeeded by: Stén Knuth (V)

Mayor of Slagelse Municipality
- In office 1 January 1998 – 31 December 2006
- Preceded by: Jens Jørgensen (C)
- Succeeded by: None

Personal details
- Born: 12 January 1952 (age 74) Korsør, Denmark
- Party: Social Democrats

Lis Tribler (born 1 January 1952) is a Danish politician. She is a member of the Social Democrats. She was the mayor of Slagelse Municipality from 1998 and until 2007, where the municipality was merged with Korsør Municipality, Skælskør Municipality and Hashøj Municipality to form a new Slagelse Municipality. She was the mayor in this merged municipality from 2007 and until 2013. She has been in the municipal council since 1990. She has a background as teacher.
