= Hashøj Municipality =

Coordinates: 55°17′37″N 11°25′05″E

Hashøj Municipality Hashøj Kommune
- Former municipality
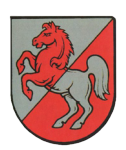
- Coat of arms

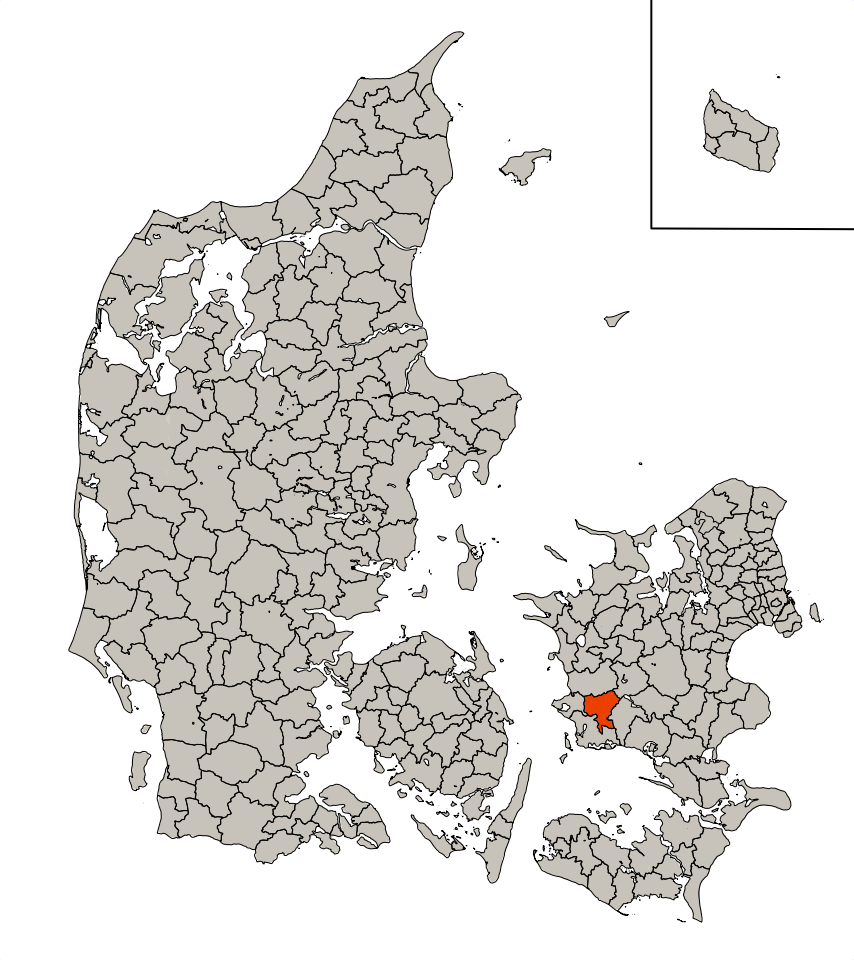
- Country: Denmark
- County: West Zealand
- Established: 1 April 1970
- Dissolved: 31 December 2006
- Seat: Dalmose

Government
  - Last mayor: Troels Christensen (V)

Area
  - Total: 130.75 km^{2} (50.48 sq mi)

Population (2006)
  - Total: 6,681
  - Density: 51.10/km^{2} (132.3/sq mi)
- Time zone: UTC1 (CET)
  - Summer (DST): UTC2 (CEST)
- Municipal code: 311

Until 1 January 2007 Hashøj Municipality was a municipality (Danish: kommune) in the former West Zealand County, on southwest Zealand, in eastern Denmark. The municipality covered an area of 130.75 km^{2}, and had a total population of 6,681 (2006). Its last mayor was Troels Christensen, a member of the Venstre party.

Hashøj Municipality bordered Skælskør Municipality to the south, Korsør Municipality to the west, Slagelse Municipality to the north, Sorø Municipality to the northeast and Fuglebjerg Municipality to the east.

The municipality ceased to exist as the result of Kommunalreformen 2007 (the Municipality Reform of 2007). It was merged with Slagelse, Korsør and Skælskør municipalities to form a new Slagelse municipality. The new municipality belongs to Region Zealand.

== History ==
In the Middle Ages, when Denmark was divided into hundreds, the area of Hashøj Municipality were under Vester Flakkebjerg Hundred and Slagelse Hundred. Vester Flakkebjerg Hundred was under Sorø County when it was established in 1662, while Slagelse Hundred came under Korsør County. Sorø County was merged with Ringsted County in 1748. It was merged again in 1798, this time with Korsør County and Antvorskov County. This county lasted until the 1970 Danish Municipal Reform where it merged with Holbæk County to create West Zealand County (Danish: Vestsjællands Amt). After the 2007 municipal reform this changed to Region Zealand.

From 1842, where parish municipalities were created, and until 1966 the area of Hashøj Municipality consisted of seven parish municipalities. They were merged in 1966 to form Hashøj Parish Municipality which would turn into Hashøj Municipality in 1970.

In the Municipality Reform of 2007 Hashøj Municipality was merged with Skælskør, Slagelse and Korsør Municipality to form a new Slagelse Municipality.

=== Historical divisions ===
Historical municipal divisions of Hashøj Municipality
2007	1970	1966	1842	Towns
Slagelse Mun.	Hashøj Mun.	Hashøj Parish Mun.	Sørbymagle-Kirkerup Parish Mun.	Sørbymagle
Slagelse Mun.	Hashøj Mun.	Hashøj Parish Mun.	Slots Bjergby-Sludstrup Parish Mun.	Slots Bjergby
Slagelse Mun.	Hashøj Mun.	Hashøj Parish Mun.	Lundforlund-Gerlev Parish Mun.	Gerlev
Slagelse Mun.	Hashøj Mun.	Hashøj Parish Mun.	Skørpinge-Fårdrup Parish Mun.	Skørpinge
Slagelse Mun.	Hashøj Mun.	Hashøj Parish Mun.	Høve-Flakkebjerg Parish Mun.	Flakkebjerg
Slagelse Mun.	Hashøj Mun.	Hashøj Parish Mun.	Gimlinge Parish Mun.	Dalmose
Slagelse Mun.	Hashøj Mun.	Hashøj Parish Mun.	Hyllested Parish Mun.	Hyllested
Slagelse Mun.	Slagelse Mun.			
Slagelse Mun.	Skælskør Mun.			
Slagelse Mun.	Korsør Mun.			

=== Mayors ===
Since the creation of the municipality in 1970 and until it was dissolved in 2007, the mayors of Hashøj Municipality were:

#	Mayor	Party	Term
1	Carl A. Christiansen	Venstre	1970-1978
2	Frede Pedersen	Venstre	1978-1991
3	Poul Jeppesen	Venstre	1991-1994
4	Niels O. Pedersen	Social Democrats	1994-2002
5	Troels Christensen	Venstre	2002-2007

== Towns ==
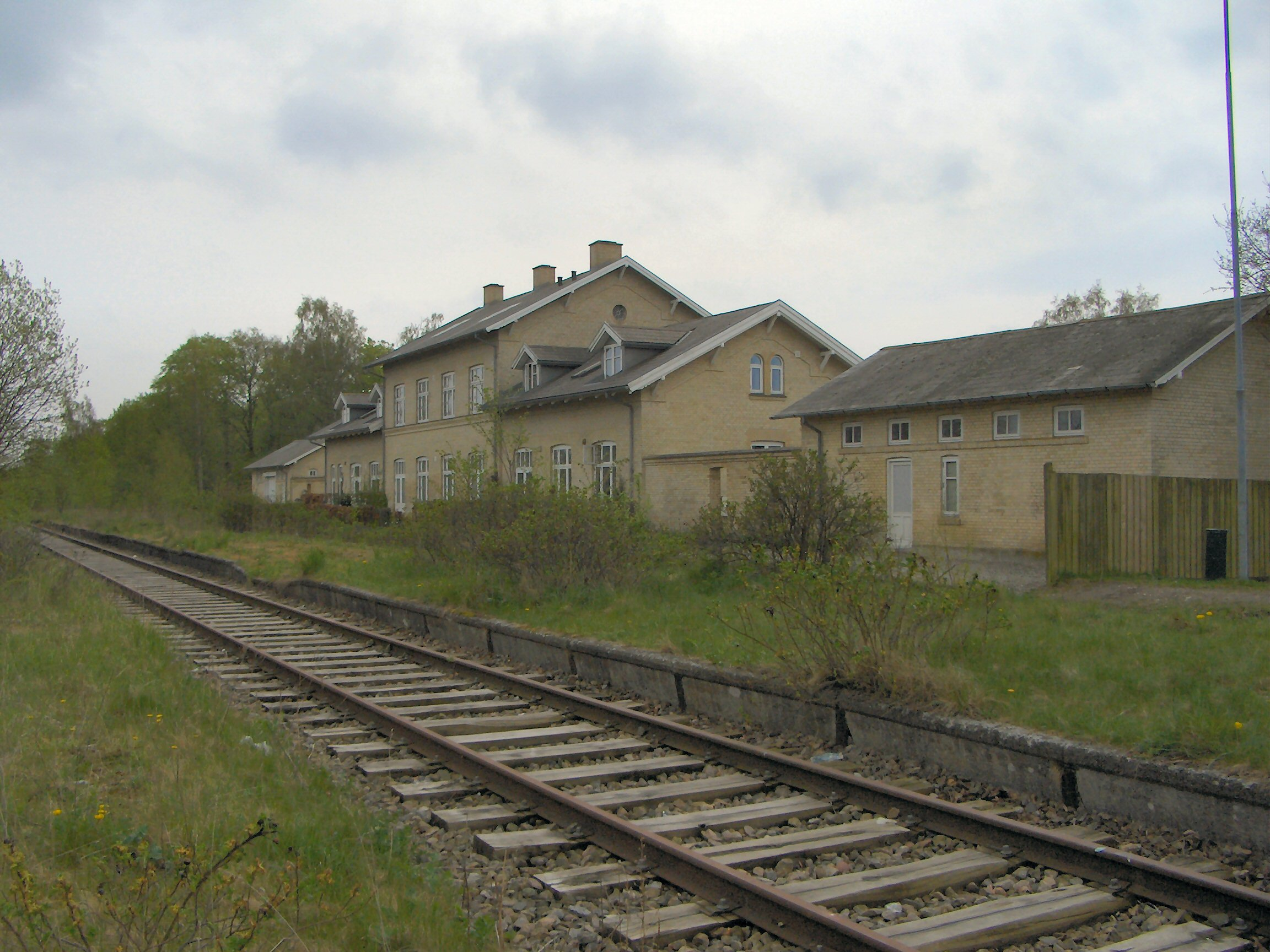
Dalmose Station

The main town of the municipality was Dalmose, with Sørbymagle being of approximately the same size. Each town housed around 15% of the municipality's population. Over half of the population lived in rural areas and small villages. The remaining population lived in Slots Bjergby and Flakkebjerg. Notable smaller villages in the municipality include Lundforlund, Gerlev, Skørpinge, Hyllested, and Kirkerup.

Dalmose was located in the southern part of the municipality, while Sørbymagle was located in the northeastern part of the municipality. A train station was located in Dalmose between 1892 and 1971.

Below are the populations from 2006 of the four larger settlements of the municipality.

Sørbymagle	1,029
Dalmose	946
Slots Bjergby	555
Flakkebjerg	387

== Politics ==
=== Municipal council ===
Below are the municipal council elected from the municipality's creation in 1970 and until 2001, which was the last election before the municipality was dissolved.

Election	Party							Total seats	Elected mayor
Election	A	B	C	F	V	Z	...	Total seats	Elected mayor
1970	4	2	2		7			15	Carl A. Christiansen (V)
1974	3	2	1		8	1		15	Carl A. Christiansen (V)
1978	5	1	1		6	2		15	Frede Pedersen (V)
1981	4		1		6	2	2	15	Frede Pedersen (V)
1985	5		3		5		2	15	Frede Pedersen (V)
1989	6	1	1	1	6			15	Frede Pedersen (V)
1993	7	1	1		6			15	Niels O. Pedersen (A)
1997	7	1	1		6			15	Niels O. Pedersen (A)
2001	6	1	1		4		3	15	Troels Christensen (V)
Data from Statistikbanken.dk and editions of Kommunal Aarbog

== Parishes ==
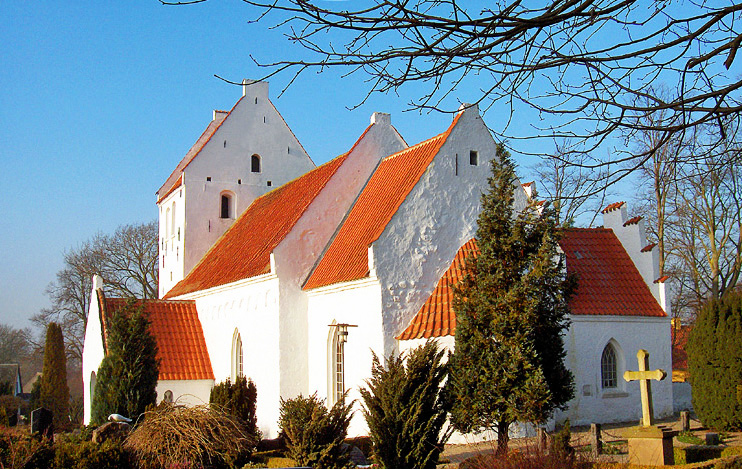
Lundforlund Church

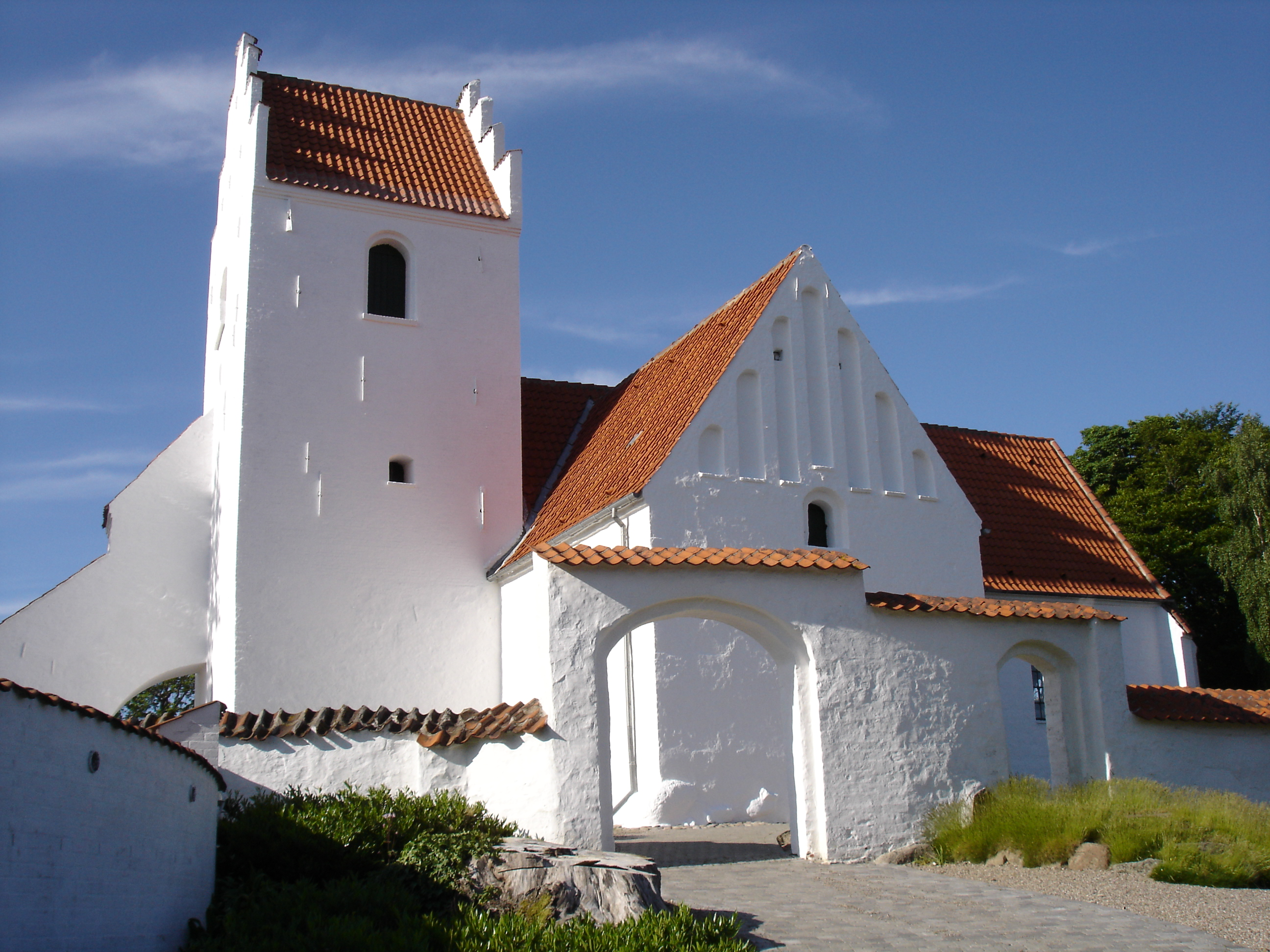
Slots Bjergby Church

The municipality consisted of twelve parishes and twelve churches.

- Flakkebjerg Parish (Flakkebjerg Church)
- Fårdrup Parish (Fårdrup Church)
- Gerlev Parish (Gerlev Church)
- Gimlinge Parish (Gimlinge Church)
- Hyllested Parish (Hyllested Church)
- Høve Parish (Høve Church)
- Kirkerup Parish (Kirkerup Church)
- Lundforlund Parish (Lundforlund Church)
- Slots Bjergby Parish (Slots Bjergby Church)
- Sludstrup Parish (Sludstrup Church)
- Skørpinge Parish (Skørpinge Church)
- Sørbymagle Parish (Sørbymagle Church)

== Symbols ==
The coat of arms of Hashøj Municipality depicted a horse. A diagonal line ran through the coat of arms, with the colors reversing on either side. On the upper half the horse was red and the background was grey. On the lower half this was reversed, with the horse being grey and the background red. An alternate version of the coat of arms featured white colour instead of grey.
