= Skælskør Municipality =

Coordinates: 55.2521°N 11.2939°E

Skælskør Municipality Skælskør Kommune
- Former municipality
- Coat of arms

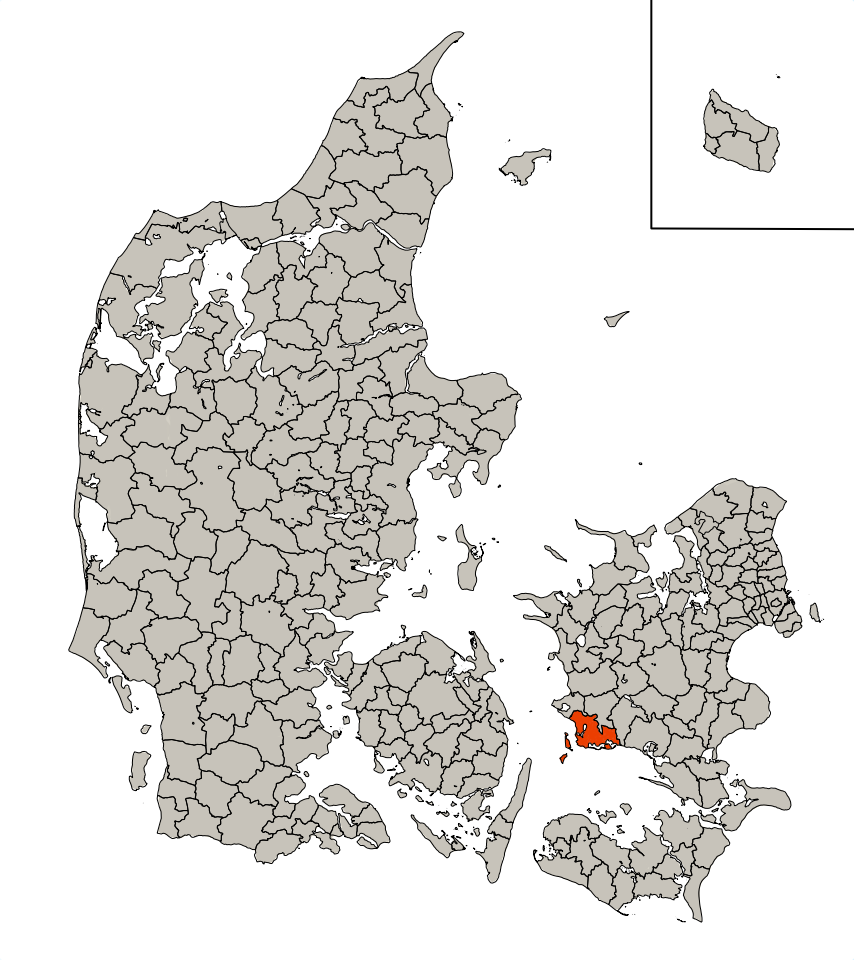
- Country: Denmark
- County: West Zealand
- Established: 1 April 1970
- Dissolved: 31 December 2006
- Seat: Skælskør

Government
  - Last mayor: Hans Ole Drost (V)

Area
  - Total: 170.02 km^{2} (65.65 sq mi)

Population (2006)
  - Total: 11,928
  - Density: 70.156/km^{2} (181.70/sq mi)
- Time zone: UTC1 (CET)
  - Summer (DST): UTC2 (CEST)
- Municipal code: 331

Until 1 January 2007 Skælskør Municipality was a municipality (Danish: kommune) in the former West Zealand County, on the southwestern coast of the island of Zealand, in eastern Denmark. The municipality covered an area of 170.02 km^{2}, and had a total population of 11,928 (2006). Its last mayor was Hans Ole Drost, a member of the Venstre.

Skælskør Municipality bordered Korsør and Hashøj Municipality to the north and Fuglebjerg Municipality to the east. The municipality included the islands of Agersø, Omø and Glænø.

To the west is the Great Belt (Danish: Storebælt), the strait that separates Zealand and the island of Funen (Danish. Fyn), and the Agersø Sound (Danish: Agersø Sund), the strait that separates Zealand from the former municipality's islands of Agersø and Omø. To the south is Karrebæksminde Bay (Danish: Karrebæksminde Bugt) and Rågø Sund. The municipality's island of Glænø lies in Karrebæksminde Bay, along with a number of other smaller islands. Noret, a large lake lies to the north of the town of Skælskør.

The municipality ceased to exist as the result of Kommunalreformen 2007 (the Municipality Reform of 2007). It was merged with Slagelse, Hashøj and Korsør municipalities to form a new Slagelse municipality. The new municipality belongs to Region Zealand.

== History ==
Skælskør was likely built in the 1100s, and was granted the status of a market town (Danish: Købstad) in 1414. It originally played a role as a transit town between Zealand, Funen and Langeland, though Korsør eventually became the more prominent transit town on the coast.

In the Middle Ages, when Denmark was divided into hundreds, the area of Skælskør Municipality were under Vester Flakkebjerg Hundred and Slagelse Hundred. Vester Flakkebjerg Hundred was under Sorø County when it was established in 1662, while Slagelse Hundred came under Korsør County. Sorø County was merged with Ringsted County in 1748. It was merged again in 1798, this time with Korsør County and Antvorskov County. This county lasted until the 1970 Danish Municipal Reform where it merged with Holbæk County to create West Zealand County (Danish: Vestsjællands Amt). After the 2007 municipal reform this changed to Region Zealand.

From 1842, where parish municipalities were created, and until 1922 the area of Skælskør Municipality consisted of nine parish municipalities. From 1875 it also consisted of Skælskør Market Town Municipality, which would merge with its Rural District Parish Municipality in 1922, leaving eight parish municipalities and one market town municipality. In 1966 many of these parish municipalities were merged to create only two parish municipalities, which would again be merged to form Skælskør Municipality in the 1970 Municipal Reform.

In the Municipality Reform of 2007 Skælskør Municipality was merged with Hashøj, Slagelse and Korsør Municipality to form a new Slagelse Municipality.

=== Historical divisions ===
Historical municipal divisions of Skælskør Municipality
2007	1970	1966	1922	1875	1842	1414	Towns
Slagelse Mun.
Slagelse Mun.	Skælskør Mun.	Skælskør Parish Mun.	Skælskør Market Town Mun.	Skælskør Market Town Mun.	Skælskør Market Town		Skælskør
Slagelse Mun.	Skælskør Mun.	Skælskør Parish Mun.	Skælskør Market Town Mun.	Skælskør's Rural Parish Mun.			Skælskør
Slagelse Mun.	Skælskør Mun.	Skælskør Parish Mun.	Tjæreby Parish Mun.				Tjæreby
Slagelse Mun.	Skælskør Mun.	Skælskør Parish Mun.	Magleby Parish Mun.				Magleby
Slagelse Mun.	Skælskør Mun.	Skælskør Parish Mun.	Eggeslevmagle Parish Mun.				Eggeslevmagle
Slagelse Mun.	Skælskør Mun.	Skælskør Parish Mun.	Boeslunde Parish Mun.				Boeslunde
Slagelse Mun.	Skælskør Mun.	Skælskør Parish Mun.	Agersø Parish Mun.				Agersø By
Slagelse Mun.	Skælskør Mun.	Skælskør Parish Mun.	Omø Parish Mun.				Omø By
Slagelse Mun.	Skælskør Mun.	Holsteinborg Parish Mun. (Note: Also part of today's Næstved Municipality.)					
Slagelse Mun.	Skælskør Mun.	Holsteinborg Parish Mun.	Ørslev-Sønder Bjerge Parish Mun.				Ørslev
Slagelse Mun.	Skælskør Mun.	Holsteinborg Parish Mun.	Holsteinborg-Venslev Parish Mun.				Bisserup
Slagelse Mun.	Skælskør Mun.	Holsteinborg Parish Mun.	Holsteinborg-Venslev Parish Mun.				Rude
Slagelse Mun.	Slagelse Mun.						
Slagelse Mun.	Hashøj Mun.						
Slagelse Mun.	Korsør Mun.						

=== Mayors ===
Since the creation of the municipality in 1970 and until it was dissolved in 2007, the mayors of Skælskør Municipality were:

#	Mayor	Party	Term
1	Svend Aage Troelsen	Venstre	1970-1974
2	Johannes Lyshjelm	Venstre	1974-1986
3	Søren Clausen	Social Democrats	1986-1994
4	Hans Christian Nielsen	Venstre	1994-2002
5	Hans Ole Drost	Venstre	2002-2007

== Towns ==
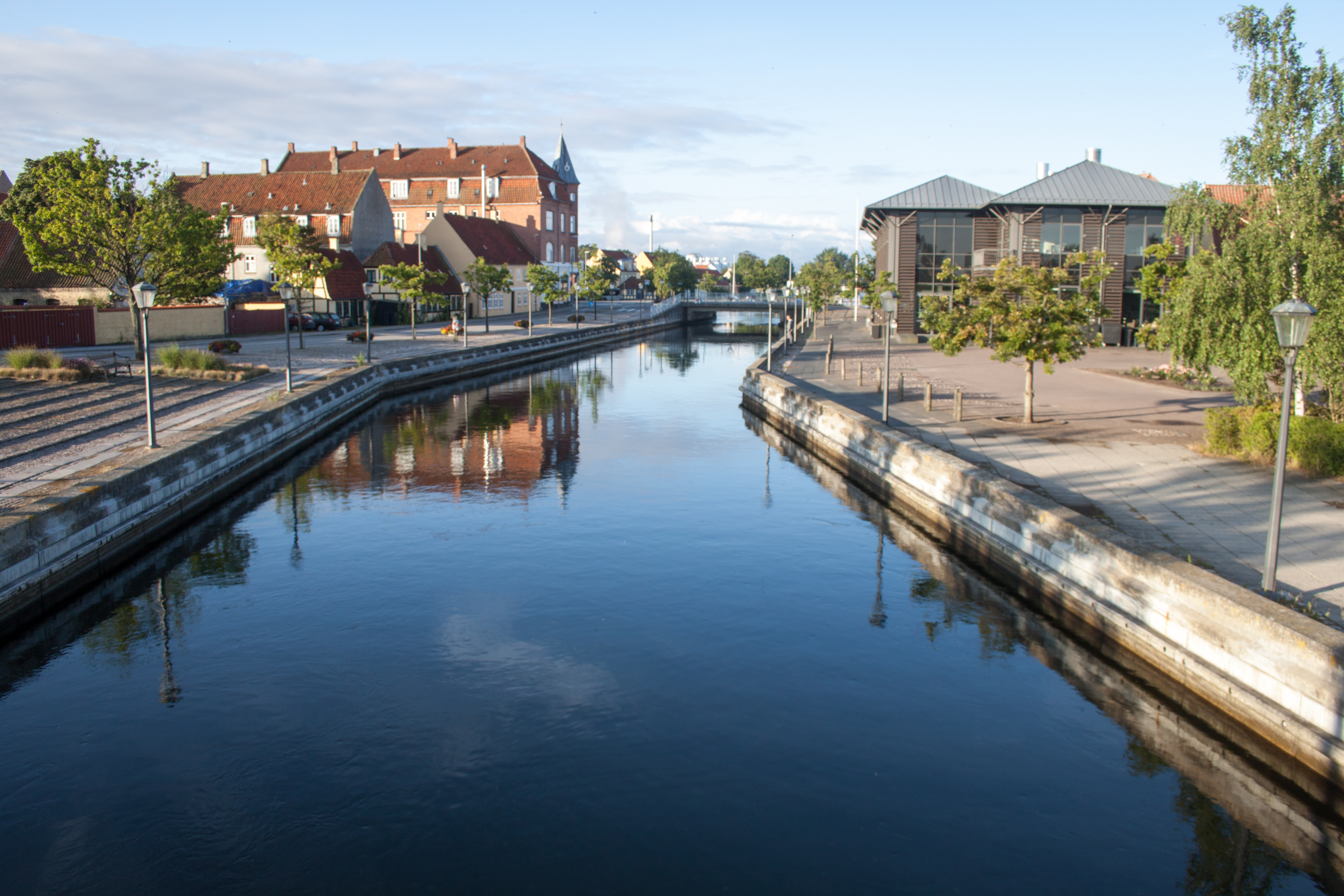
Channel in Skælskør.

The largest town in the municipality was Skælskør, where more than half of the municipality's population lived. Nearly a third of the population lived in rural areas. The remaining population lived in the towns of Bisserup, Boeslunde, Eggeslevmagle and Rude. Notable smaller villages in the municipality included the main settlements on Agersø and Omø: Agersø By and Omø By.

Skælskør was located in the western part of the municipality, bordering Skælskør Nor, giving it access to the sea. In the town is a church from the 1200s. It is named Saint Nicholas Church (Danish: Sankt Nicolai Kirke) and is located centrally in the town. One of the largest breweries in Denmark, Harboe's Brewery, has been located in Skælskør since its foundation in 1883.

Below are the populations from 2006 of the five larger settlements of the municipality.

Skælskør	6,373
Boeslunde	767
Bisserup	557
Rude	278
Eggeslevmagle	202

== Politics ==
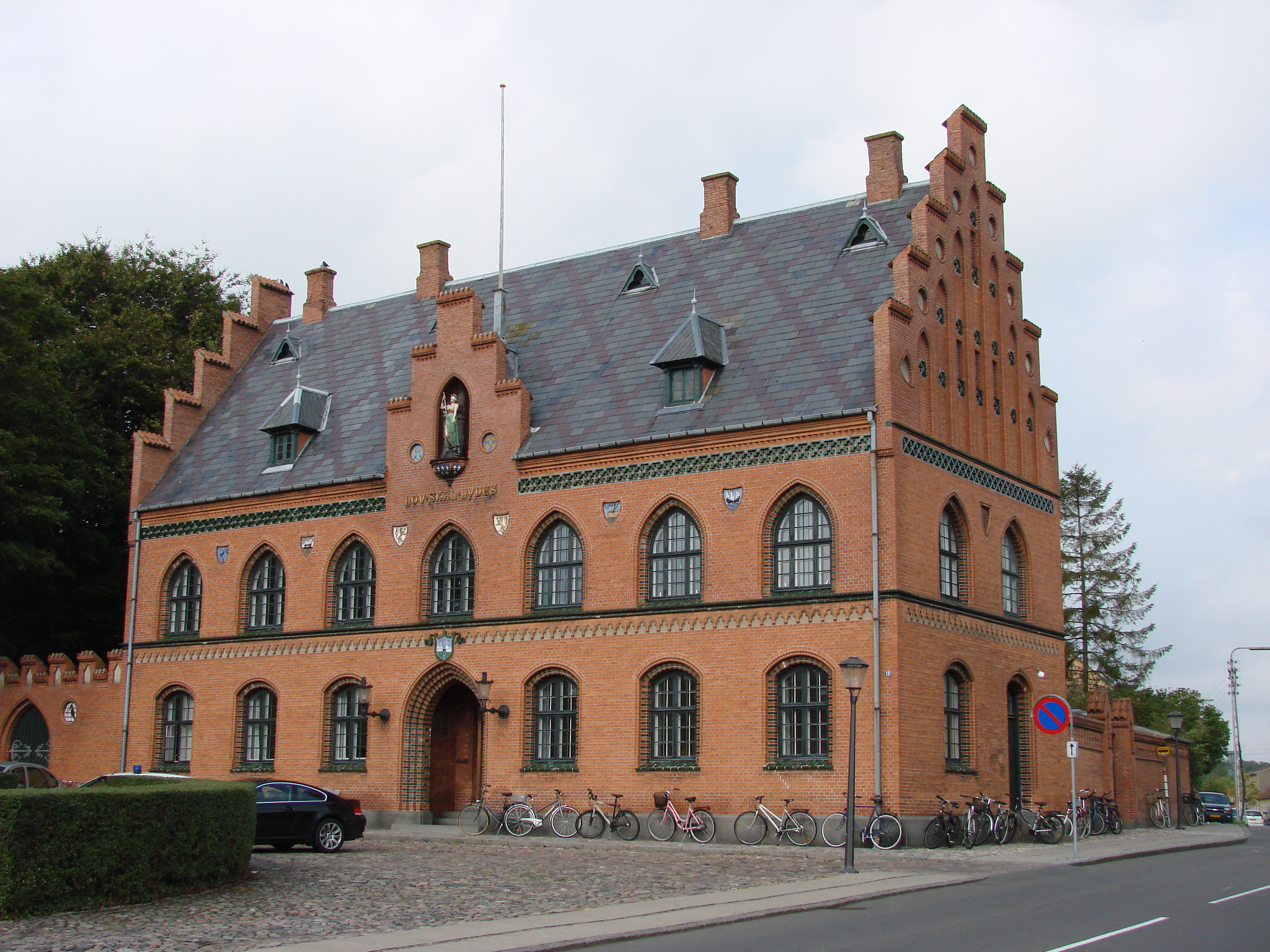
The city hall in Skælskør.

=== Municipal council ===
Below are the municipal council elected from the municipality's creation in 1970 and until 2001, which was the last election before the municipality was dissolved.

Election	Party								Total seats	Elected mayor
Election	A	B	C	F	O	V	Z	...	Total seats	Elected mayor
1970	6	1	3			5			15	Svend Aage Troelsen (V)
1974	4	1	1			6	3		15	Johannes Lyshjelm (V)
1978	5	1	2	1		4	2		15	Johannes Lyshjelm (V)
1981	5	1	2	1		5	1		15	Johannes Lyshjelm (V)
1985	6		3	2		4			15	Søren Clausen (A)
1989	5	1	1	2		6			15	Søren Clausen (A)
1993	5		2	1		5		2	15	Hans Christian Nielsen (V)
1997	5		1	2		6		1	15	Hans Christian Nielsen (V)
2001	3	1	1	3	1	6			15	Hans Ole Drost (V)
Data from Statistikbanken.dk and editions of Kommunal Aarbog

== Parishes ==
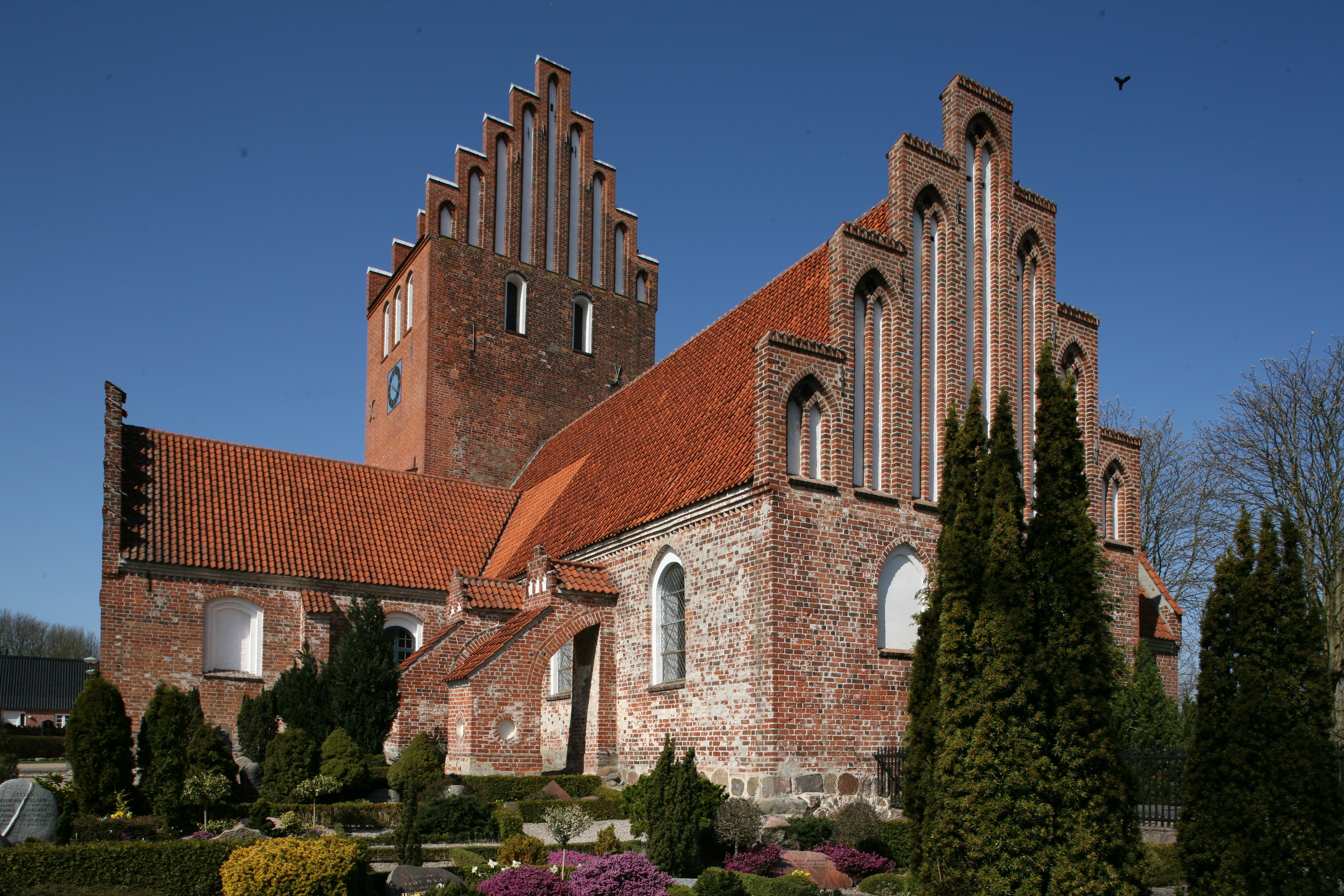
Boeslunde Church

The municipality consisted of eleven parishes and eleven churches.

- Agersø Parish (Agersø Church)
- Boeslunde Parish (Boeslunde Church)
- Eggeslevmagle Parish (Eggeslevmagle Church)
- Holsteinborg Parish (Holsteinborg Church)
- Magleby Parish (Magleby Church)
- Omø Parish (Omø Church)
- Skælskør Parish (Saint Nicholas Church)
- Sønder Bjerge Parish (Sønder Bjerge Church)
- Tjæreby Parish (Tjæreby Church)
- Venslev Parish (Venslev Church)
- Ørslev Parish (Ørslev Church)

== Symbols ==
Coat of Arms of Skælskør Municipality.

The municipality's coat of arms is the same as the town of Skælskør's. It shows a bridge connecting the two parts of the town of Skælskør. The church is located to the left, illustrated with crosses. The city hall is on the right. They stand on green grass with a river running across the land and through the town, under the bridge. In the river is an escallop, which is in reference to the origin of the town's name "Skælfisk-ør" translating to shellfish beach. The sky is dark blue.
