= Korsør Municipality =

Coordinates: 55°19′31″N 11°09′04″E

Korsør Municipality Korsør Kommune
- Former municipality
- Coat of arms

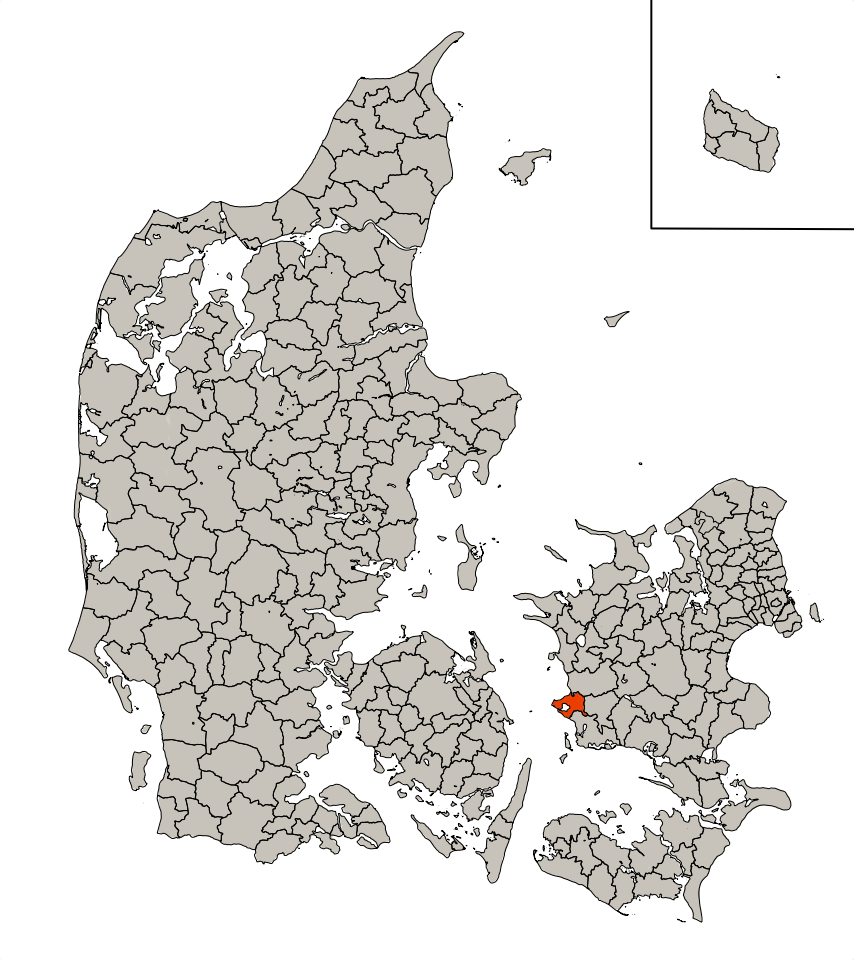
- Country: Denmark
- County: West Zealand
- Established: 1 April 1970
- Dissolved: 31 December 2006
- Seat: Korsør

Government
  - Last mayor: Flemming Erichsen (A)

Area
  - Total: 74.25 km^{2} (28.67 sq mi)

Population (2006)
  - Total: 20,873
  - Density: 281.1/km^{2} (728.1/sq mi)
- Time zone: UTC1 (CET)
  - Summer (DST): UTC2 (CEST)
- Municipal code: 325

Until 1 January 2007 Korsør Municipality was a municipality (Danish: kommune) in the former West Zealand County, on the southwestern coast of the island of Zealand, in eastern Denmark. The municipality covered an area of 74.25 km^{2}, and had a total population of 20,873 (2006). Its last mayor was Flemming Erichsen, a member of the Social Democrats.

Korsør Municipality bordered Skælskør Municipality to the south, Hashøj Municipality to the east and Slagelse Municipality to the north. It connected to Nyborg Municipality through the Great Belt ferries. To the west was the Great Belt (Storebælt), the strait that separates Zealand and the island of Funen peninsula.

The municipality ceased to exist as the result of Kommunalreformen 2007 (the Municipality Reform of 2007). It was merged with Slagelse, Hashøj and Skælskør municipalities to form a new Slagelse municipality. The new municipality belongs to Region Zealand.

== History ==
Korsør was likely built in the 1100-1300s, and was granted the status of a market town (Danish: Købstad) in 1425 - possibly earlier. Korsør became a prominent transit town between Zealand, Funen and Langeland.

In the Middle Ages, when Denmark was divided into hundreds, the area of Korsør Municipality was under Slagelse Hundred. Slagelse Hundred came under Korsør County when it was established in 1662. In 1798 Korsør County was merged with Sorø County and Antvorskov County. This county lasted until the 1970 Danish Municipal Reform where it merged with Holbæk County to create West Zealand County (Danish: Vestsjællands Amt). After the 2007 municipal reform this changed to Region Zealand.

From 1842, where parish municipalities were created, and until 1970 consisted of two parish municipalities. From 1875 it also consisted of Korsør Market Town Municipality.

In the Municipality Reform of 2007 Skælskør Municipality was merged with Hashøj, Slagelse and Korsør Municipality to form a new Slagelse Municipality.

=== Historical divisions ===
Historical municipal divisions of Korsør Municipality
2007	1970	1875	1842	1425	Towns
Slagelse Mun.
Slagelse Mun.	Korsør Mun.	Korsør Market Town Mun.	Korsør Market Town		Korsør
Slagelse Mun.	Korsør Mun.	Tårnborg Parish Mun.			Svenstrup
Slagelse Mun.	Korsør Mun.	Tårnborg Parish Mun.			Frølunde Fed
Slagelse Mun.	Korsør Mun.	Vemmelev-Hemmeshøj Parish Mun.			Forlev-Vemmelev
Slagelse Mun.	Slagelse Mun.				
Slagelse Mun.	Hashøj Mun.				
Slagelse Mun.	Skælskør Mun.				

=== Mayors ===
Since the creation of the municipality in 1970 and until it was dissolved in 2007, the mayors of Korsør Municipality were:

#	Mayor	Party	Term
1	Poul Hvidtved Larsen	Social Democrats	1970-1978
2	Povl Mortensen	Social Democrats	1978-1991
3	Flemming Erichsen	Social Democrats	1991-2007

== Towns ==
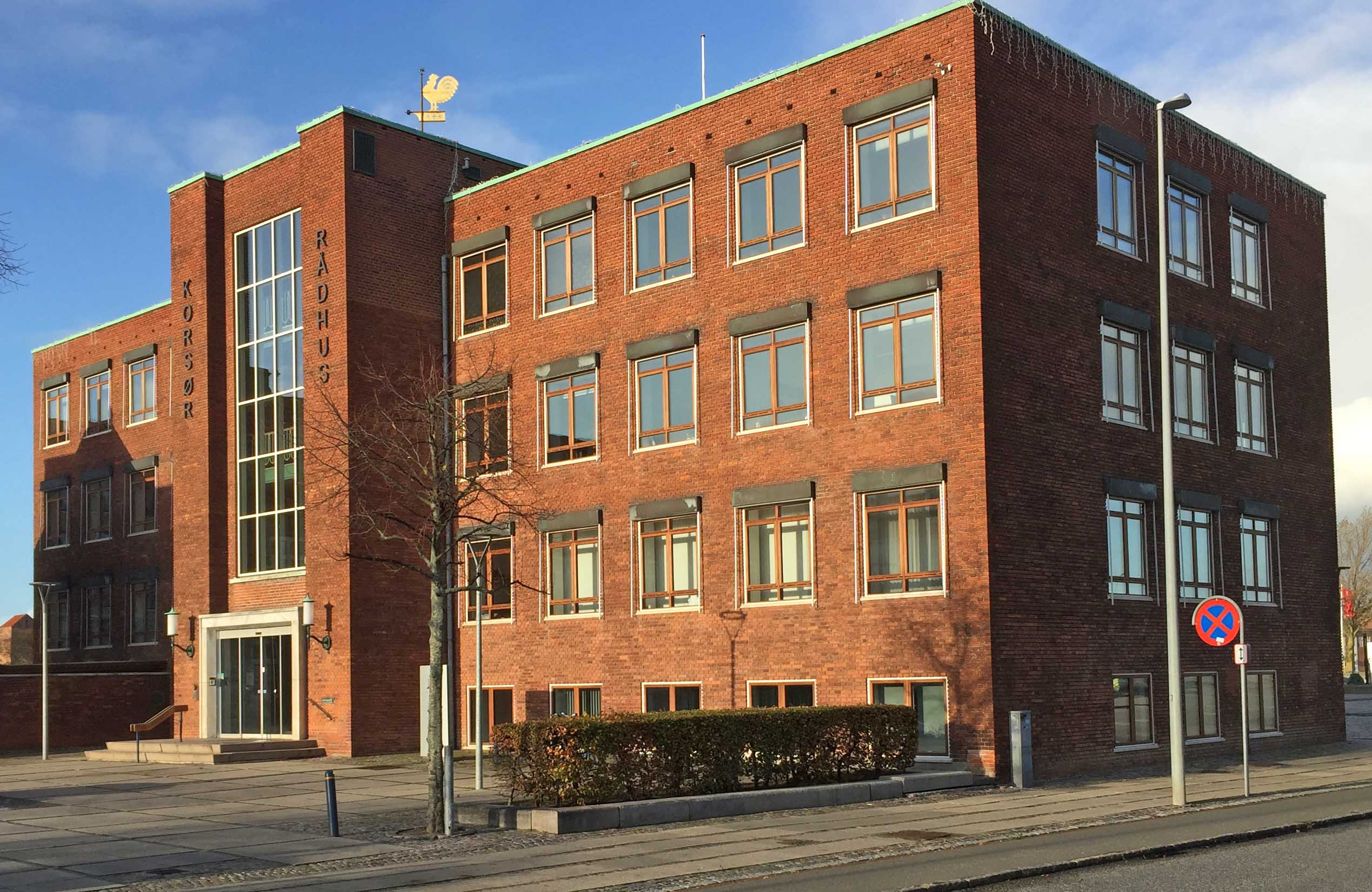
The city hall in Korsør

The largest town of the municipality was Korsør, where more than two thirds of the municipality's population lived. The remaining population lived in rural areas, as well as the two larger settlements of Forlev and Svenstrup. Notable villages in the municipality include Frølunde Fed.

Korsør was located in the western part of the municipality. Until the construction of the Great Belt Bridge Korsør was largely a transit town.

Below are the populations from 2006 of the three larger settlements of the municipality.

Korsør	14,850
Forlev	2,164
Svenstrup	1,949

== Politics ==
=== Municipal council ===
Below are the municipal council elected from the municipality's creation in 1970 and until 2001, which was the last election before the municipality was dissolved.

Election	Party								Total seats	Elected mayor
Election	A	C	F	K	O	V	Z	...	Total seats	Elected mayor
1970	10	4	1			2			17	Poul Hvidtved Larsen (A)
1974	9	3	3			2	1		17	Poul Hvidtved Larsen (A)
1978	9	4	2			1	1		17	Povl Mortensen (A)
1981	10	2	1	1		1	1	1	17	Povl Mortensen (A)
1985	11	3	2			1			17	Povl Mortensen (A)
1989	9	3	3			1		1	17	Povl Mortensen (A)
1993	9	3	2			3			17	Flemming Erichsen (A)
1997	8	2	1		1	3		2	17	Flemming Erichsen (A)
2001	8	1	2		2	4			17	Flemming Erichsen (A)
Data from Statistikbanken.dk and editions of Kommunal Aarbog

== Parishes ==
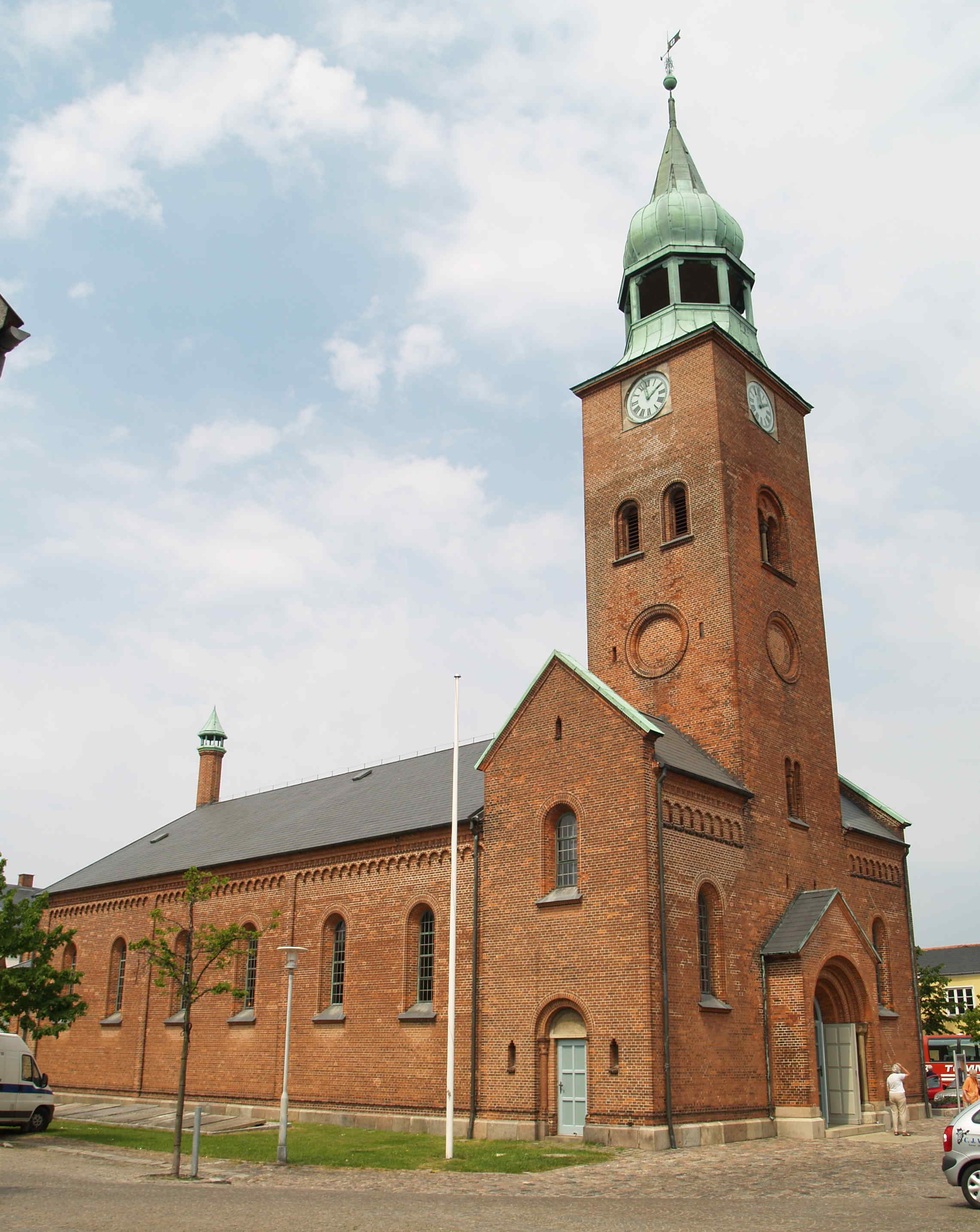
Saint Paul's Church

The municipality consisted of five parishes and five churches.

- Halskov Parish (Halskov Church)
- Hemmeshøj Parish (Hemmeshøj Church)
- Saint Paul's Parish (Danish: Sankt Povls Sogn) (Saint Paul's Church)
- Tårnborg Parish (Tårnborg Church)
- Vemmelev Parish (Vemmelev Church)

== Symbols ==
The coat of arms of Korsør is a blue cross on golden background.
