= Saint Michael Parish =

Saint Michael Parish may refer to:

- The Parish of Saint Michael, Barbados
- Saint Michaels Parish, Denmark
