= John Dyrby Paulsen =

Danish politician

Mayor of Slagelse Municipality
- Incumbent
- Assumed office 1 January 2018
- Preceded by: Stén Knuth (V)

Member of the Folketing
- In office 7 February 2006 – 13 November 2007
- Constituency: Vestjylland

Member of the Folketing
- In office 13 November 2007 – 18 June 2015
- Constituency: Zealand

Personal details
- Born: 12 July 1963 (age 62) Korsør, Denmark
- Party: Social Democrats

John Dyrby Paulsen (born 12 July 1963) is a Danish politician. He is a member of the party Social Democrats, and is the current mayor of Slagelse Municipality. He was elected mayor after the 2017 Danish local elections, though has been in the municipal council since 2014. Before that he sat in the Folketing under two different constituencies from 2006 to 2015. He also acted as a temporary member of parliament twice, first period between 10 March 2005 to 30 April 2005 and second period between 6 September 2005 to 6 February 2006. He also sat in the municipal council of the now defunct Korsør Municipality between 1998 and 2005.
