= Hornung & Møller =

Hornung & Møller was a Danish piano factory that operated from 1827 to 1972.

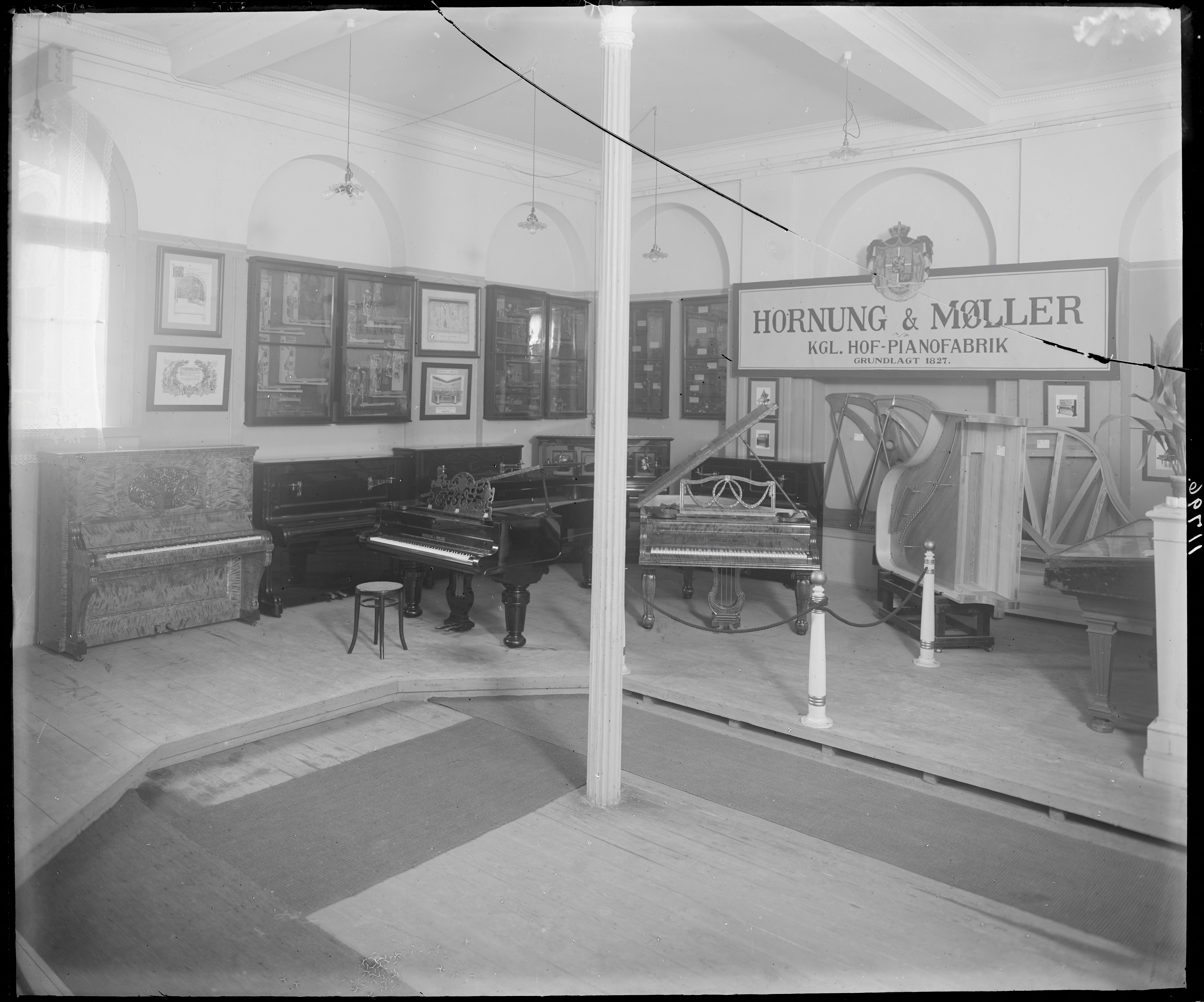
A piano exhibition by Hornung & Møller. Photo by Peter Elfelt

== History ==
Hornung & Møller dominated the piano industry in the mid-1800s and introduced the cast iron frame. The company was founded by Conrad Christian Hornung (b Skælskør July 1801-Copenhagen 11 June 1873) a hat-maker from Skælskør, who became interested in piano making during a visit to Germany.

After studying in Germany, he returned to Denmark, where he produced his first piano in 1827 and established a shop in his native town of Skælskør. The company moved to Slagelse in 1834 and to Copenhagen in 1842.

Hornung and Møller of manufacturers to the Danish. The manufactory was founded by Conrad Christian Hornung b. 1801 Skjelsbor Island of Denmark who transferred it to his former assistant Hans Møller b. May 1802. It was still called Hornung and in 1842 the firm introduced the cast iron frame. The factory is worked by steam and employs about 100 workers. The excellence of the piano is generally acknowledged.

— Dictionary of Pianists and Composers for the Pianoforte

In 1851, he transferred the entire company to his employee Hans Peter Møller, whose name was added to the company's name. At Møller 's death in 1859, the company was led by his widow, with his 20-year-old son Frederik Møller as general manager. The factory moved to Dehns Palace in Bredgade in 1872, which was also used as a showcase for the instruments.

From 1843, the factory became the royal court supplier. In 1907 it became a public limited company.

The company produced upright, square (until 1880) and grand pianos and is credited with the development of several regulating tools sold by Hammacher Schlemmer, Lyon and Healy and Dolge.

The factory closed in July 1972 after producing more than 50,000 instruments.

== Management ==
- 1827-1851: C.C. Hornung
- 1851-1859: Hans Peter Møller
- 1859-1917: Frederik Møller
- 1878-1926: Conrad Møller
- 1907-1951: Axel R. Møller
- 1907-1967: Knud Møller
- 1951-1972: Bjørn Møller

== See also ==
- Louis Zwicki
