= Skælskør Parish =

Parish in Slagelse Municipality, Denmark

Skælskør Parish Skælskør Sogn
- Parish
- The parish within Slagelse Municipality
- Coordinates: 55.254°N 11.287°E
- Country: Denmark
- Region: Zealand
- Municipality: Slagelse Municipality
- Diocese: Roskilde

Population (2025)
  - Total: 3,788
- Parish number: 7308

Skælskør Parish (Danish: Skælskør Sogn) is a parish in the Diocese of Roskilde in Slagelse Municipality, Denmark. The parish contains the town of Skælskør.
