= Stén Knuth =

Danish politician

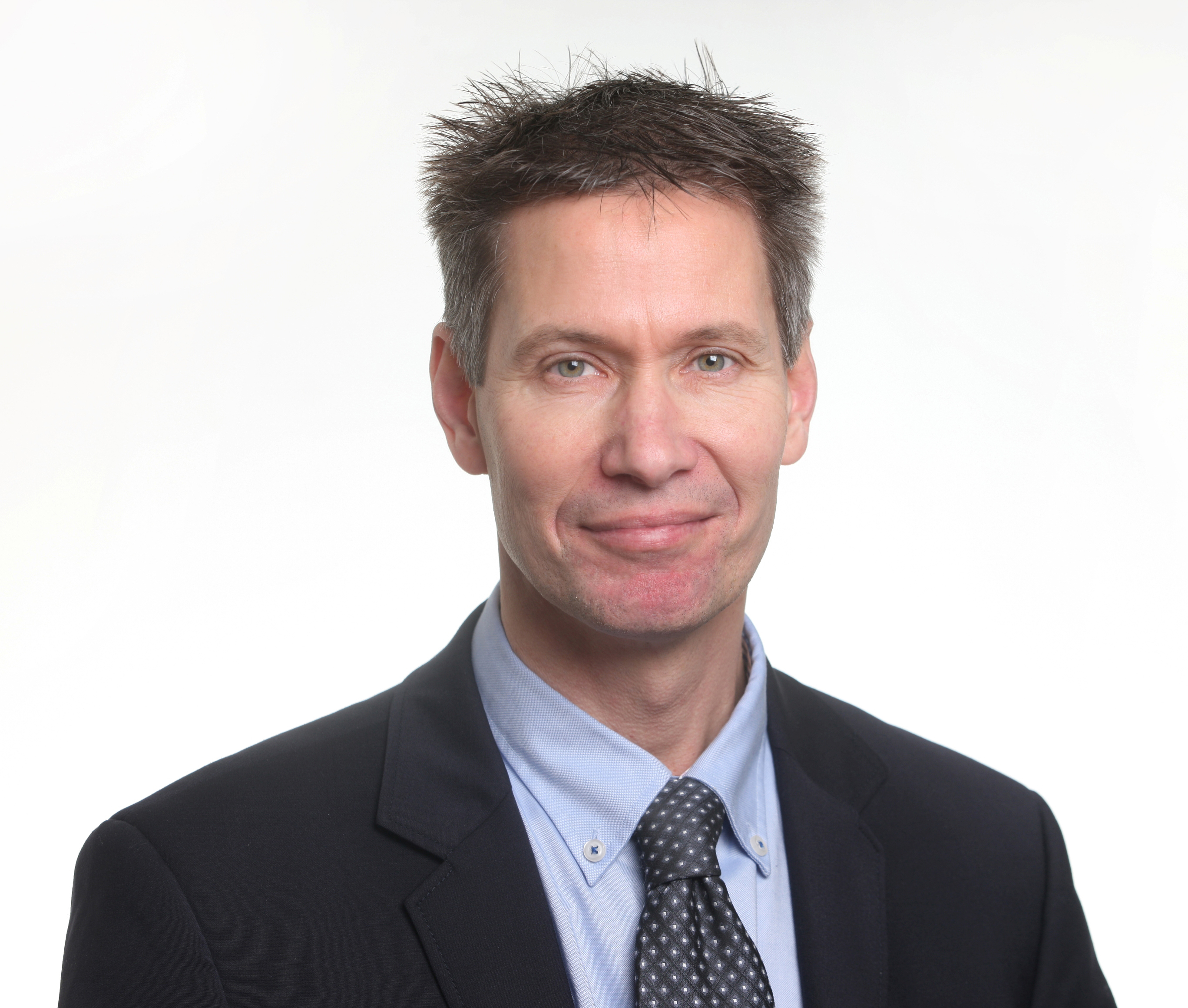

Mayor of Slagelse Municipality
- In office 1 January 2014 – 31 December 2017
- Preceded by: Lis Tribler (A)
- Succeeded by: John Dyrby Paulsen (A)

Member of the Folketing
- Incumbent
- Assumed office 5 June 2019
- Constituency: Zealand

Personal details
- Born: 15 December 1964 (age 61) Slagelse, Denmark
- Party: Venstre

Stén Knuth (born 15 December 1964 in Slagelse) is a Danish politician who is a member of the Folketing for the Venstre political party. He was elected into parliament in the 2019 Danish general election.

Knuth has been in the municipal council of Slagelse Municipality since 2006 and was the mayor from 2014 to 2017. He was elected into parliament in the 2019 election.
