= List of churches in Næstved Municipality =

This list of churches in Næstved Municipality lists church buildings in Næstved Municipality, Denmark.

== List ==
Name	Location	Year	Coordinates	Image	Refs
Aversi Church	Annisse	c. 1370	55°20′42.36″N 11°51′5.75″E		
Bavelse Church	Blistrup				
Everdrup Church	Everdrup	c. 1200	55°12′5.03″N 11°57′24.83″E		
Fensmark Church	Fensmark				
Fodby Church	Græsted	c. 1200	55°14′57.12″N 12°16′48″E		
Fuglebjerg Church	Fuglebjerg	c. 1100	55°18′20″N 11°32′54″E		
Fyrendal Church	Mårum	c. 1100	55°14′55.68″N 11°30′42.47″E		
Førslev Church	Førslev	12th century	55°16′33.95″N 11°34′38.64″E		
Gavnø Chapel	Gavnø				
Glumsø Church	Glumsø				
Gunderslev Church	Gunderslev				
Haldagerlille Church	Haldagerlille	c. 1100	56°03′51.4″N 12°08′27″E		
Hammer Church	Hammer				
Herlufmagle Church	Herlufmagle	16th century	55°18′45.75″N 11°45′29.21″E		
Herlufsholm Chapel	Blistrup				
Holme-Olstrup Church	Holme-Olstrup				
Hyllinge Church	Hyllinge				
Hårslev Church	Hårslev				
Karrebæk Church	Karrebæksminde				
Krummerup Church	Krummerup				
Førslev Church	Førslev				
Kvislemark Church	Kvislemark				
Marvede Church	Marvede				
Mogenstrup Church	Mogenstrup				
St Morten's Church	Næstved	c. 1200	55°13′47″N 11°45′39″E		
Mæsby Church	Næsby				
Næstelsø Church	Næstelsø				
St. Peter's Church	Næstved	14th century	55°13′48″N 11°45′25″E		
Rislev Church	Rislev				
Rønnebæk Church	Rønnebæk				
Sandby Church	Sandby				
Skelby Church	Skelby				
Snesere Church	Næstved	c. 1200	55°09′55.3″N 11°55′49.8″E		
Ting Jellinge Church					
Toksværd Church	Toksværd				
Tybjerg Church	Tybjerg	12th century	55°20′54″N 11°48′44″E		
Tystrup Church	Tystrup				
Tyvelse Church	Tyvelse				
Vallensved Church	Vallensved		55°15′55.4″N 11°39′9.1″E		
Vejlø Church	Vejlø	c. 1275	55°10′35.42″N 11°45′12.66″E		
Vester Egesborg Church	Vester Egesborg	c. 1275	55°09′28.03″N 11°49′7.84″E		
Vrangstrup Church	Vrangstrup				

== See also ==
- Listed buildings in Næstved Municipality
- List of churches in Slagelse Municipality
