= Dalmose =

- Village
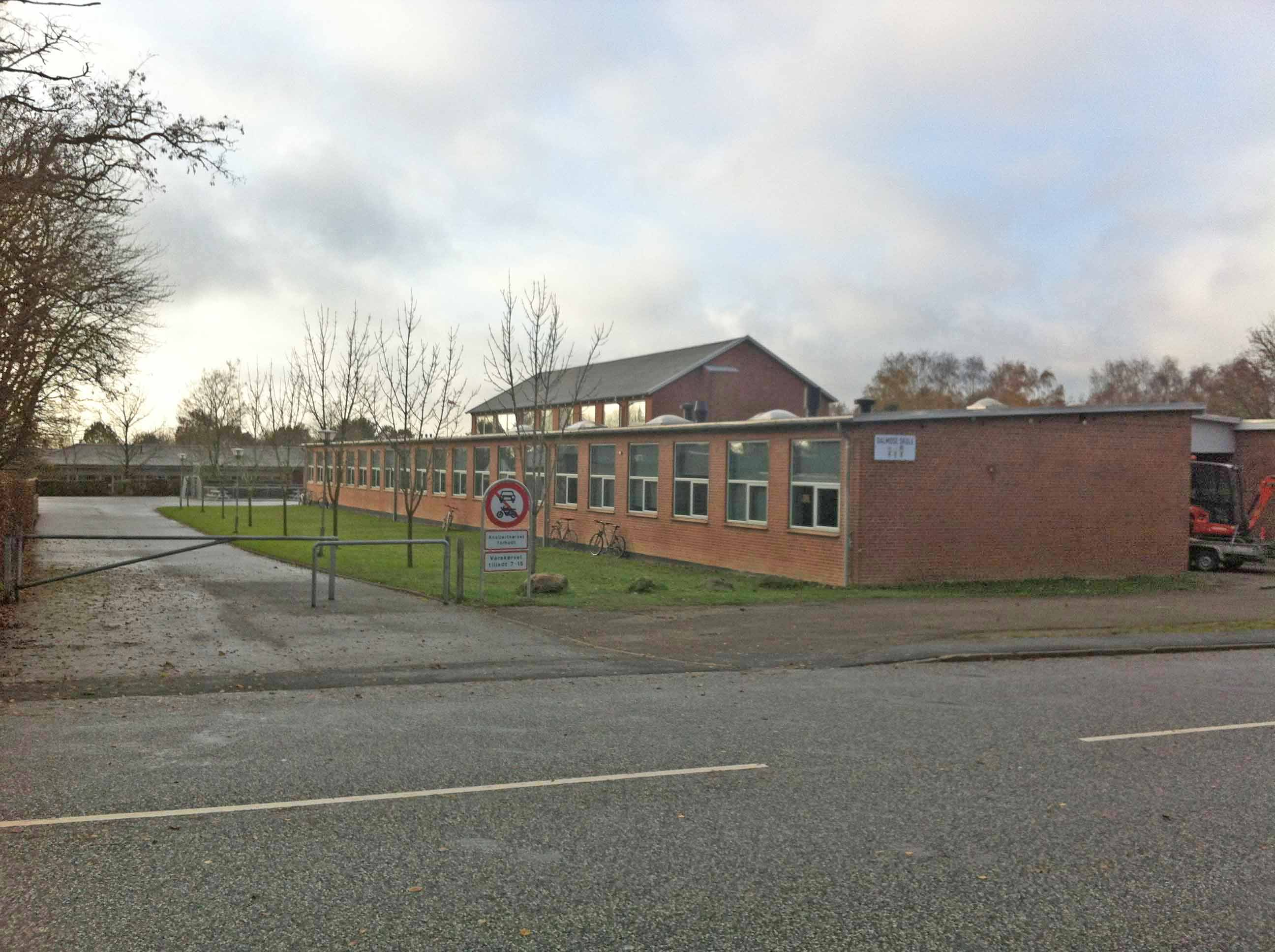
- Dalmose School

- Location in Region Zealand
- Coordinates: 55°17′37″N 11°25′11″E
- Country: Denmark
- Region: Region Zealand
- Municipality: Slagelse

Population (2026)
  - Total: 983
- Time zone: UTC+1 (CET)
  - Summer (DST): UTC+2 (CEST)

Dalmose is a village, with a population of 983 (1 January 2026), in Slagelse Municipality, Region Zealand in Denmark.

It is located on the southwestern part of the island of Zealand, 26 km northwest of Næstved, 11 km northeast of Skælskør, 19 km east of Korsør and 16 km south of Slagelse.
