= Svenstrup (Slagelse Municipality) =

- Town
- Location in Region Zealand Svenstrup (Denmark)
- Coordinates: 55°21′54″N 11°10′20″E
- Country: Denmark
- Region: Region Zealand
- Municipality: Slagelse

Area
  - Urban: 1.31 km^{2} (0.51 sq mi)

Population (2026)
  - Urban: 1,811
  - Urban density: 1,380/km^{2} (3,580/sq mi)
- Time zone: UTC+1 (CET)
  - Summer (DST): UTC+2 (CEST)
- Postal code: DK-4220 Korsør

Svenstrup is a town on Zealand, Denmark. It is located in Slagelse Municipality, 5 km northeast of Korsør, 4 km southwest of Forlev-Vemmelev and 10 km southwest of Slagelse.

The town has nearly grown together with the surrounding villages of Frølunde, Knivkær, Stibjerg Huse and Ny Halseby. Together they form a small urban area with a population of 1,811 (1 January 2026).
