= Stillinge Strand =

- Village
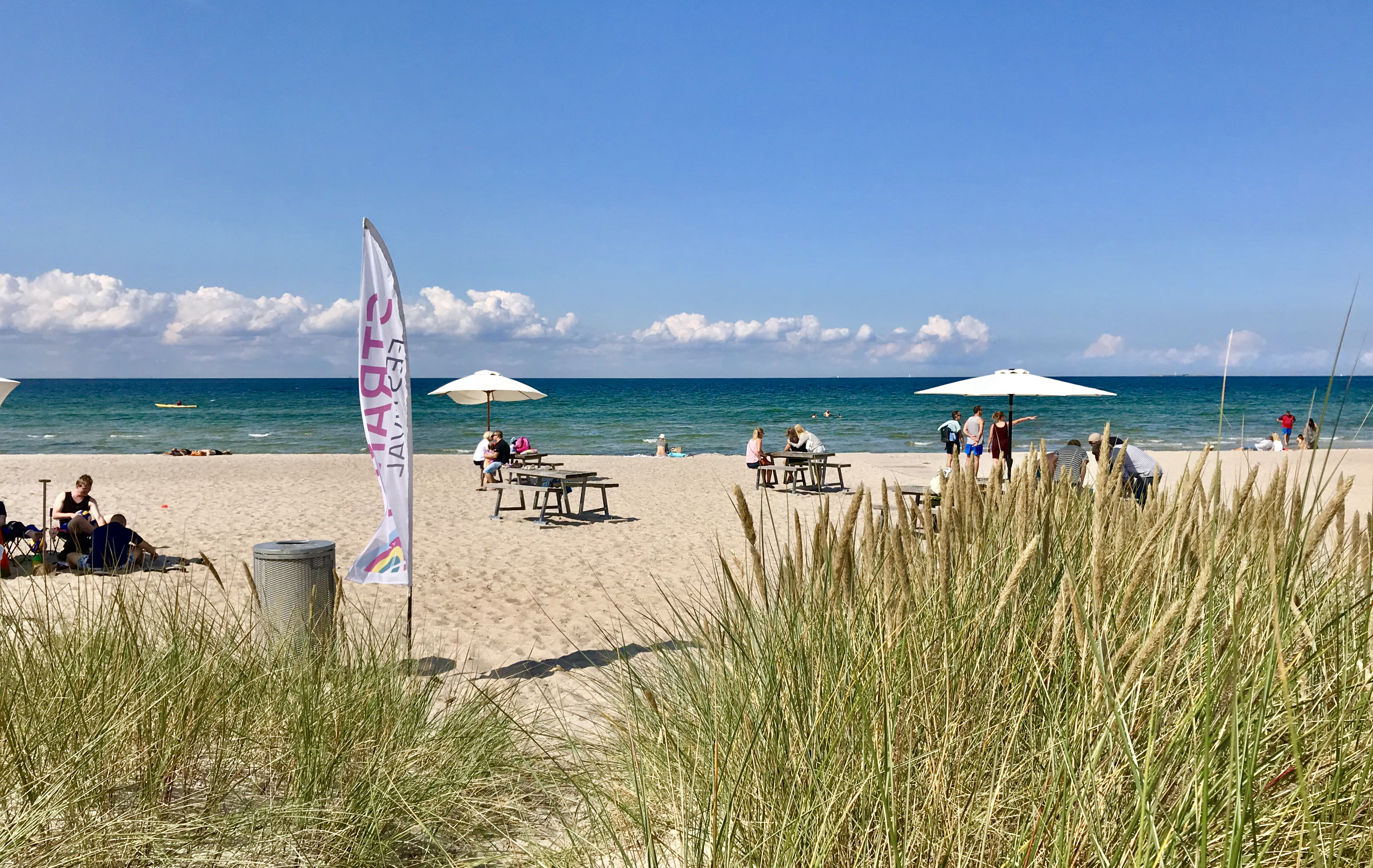
- Stillinge Strand

- Location in Region Zealand
- Coordinates: 55°26′32″N 11°12′35″E
- Country: Denmark
- Region: Region Zealand
- Municipality: Slagelse

Population (2026)
  - Total: 401
- Time zone: UTC+1 (CET)
  - Summer (DST): UTC+2 (CEST)

Stillinge Strand is a beach and a village on Zealand, Denmark. It is located in Slagelse Municipality. The name of the village translates to 'Stillinge Beach', and a sizable beach of the same name borders the village.

== Road names in granit ==
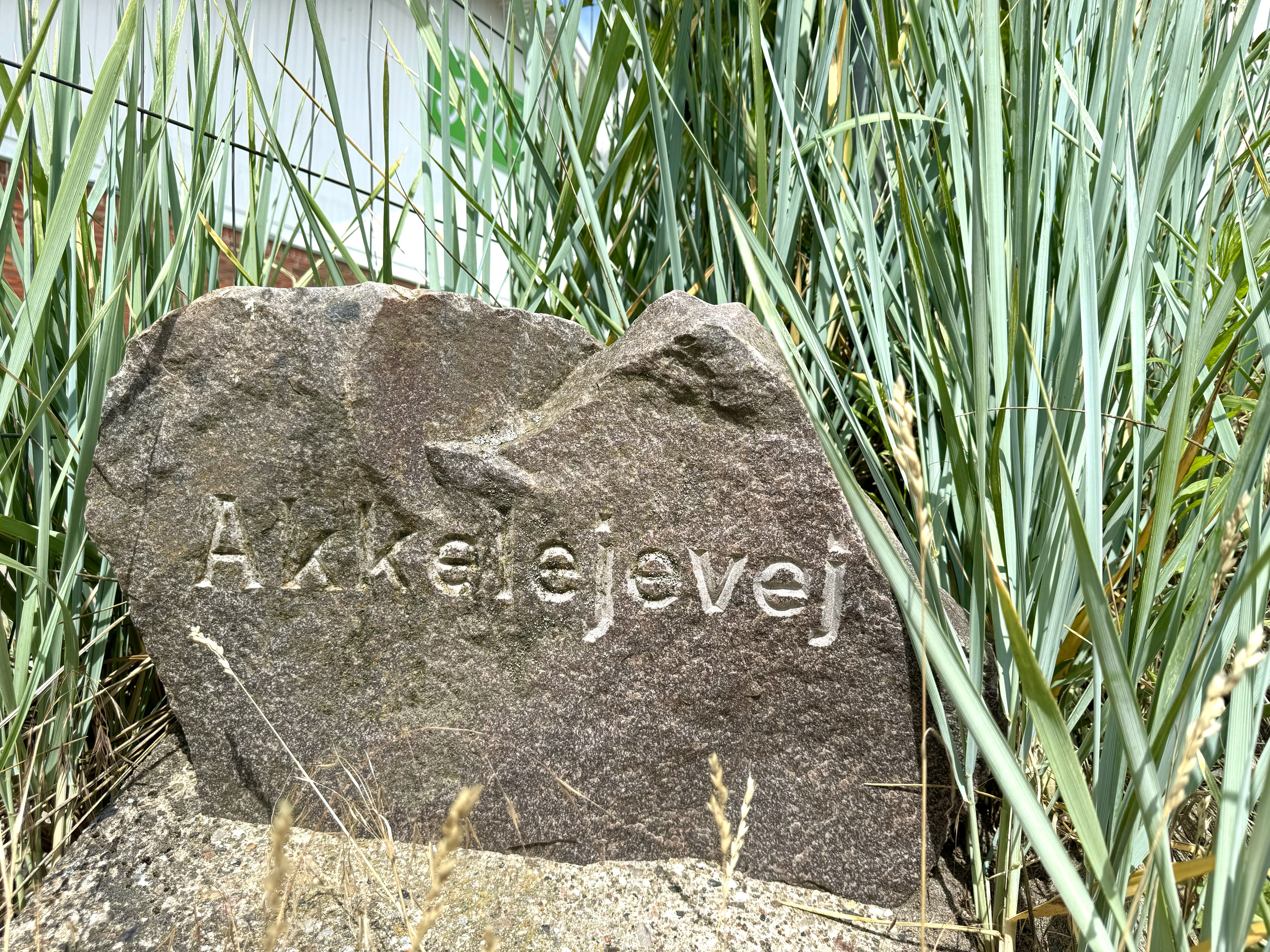
Akkelejevej. Stillinge Strand

Many of the roads at Stillinge Strand have preserved the old granit stones with road names. The granit stones are from 1949.

== The beach medows ==
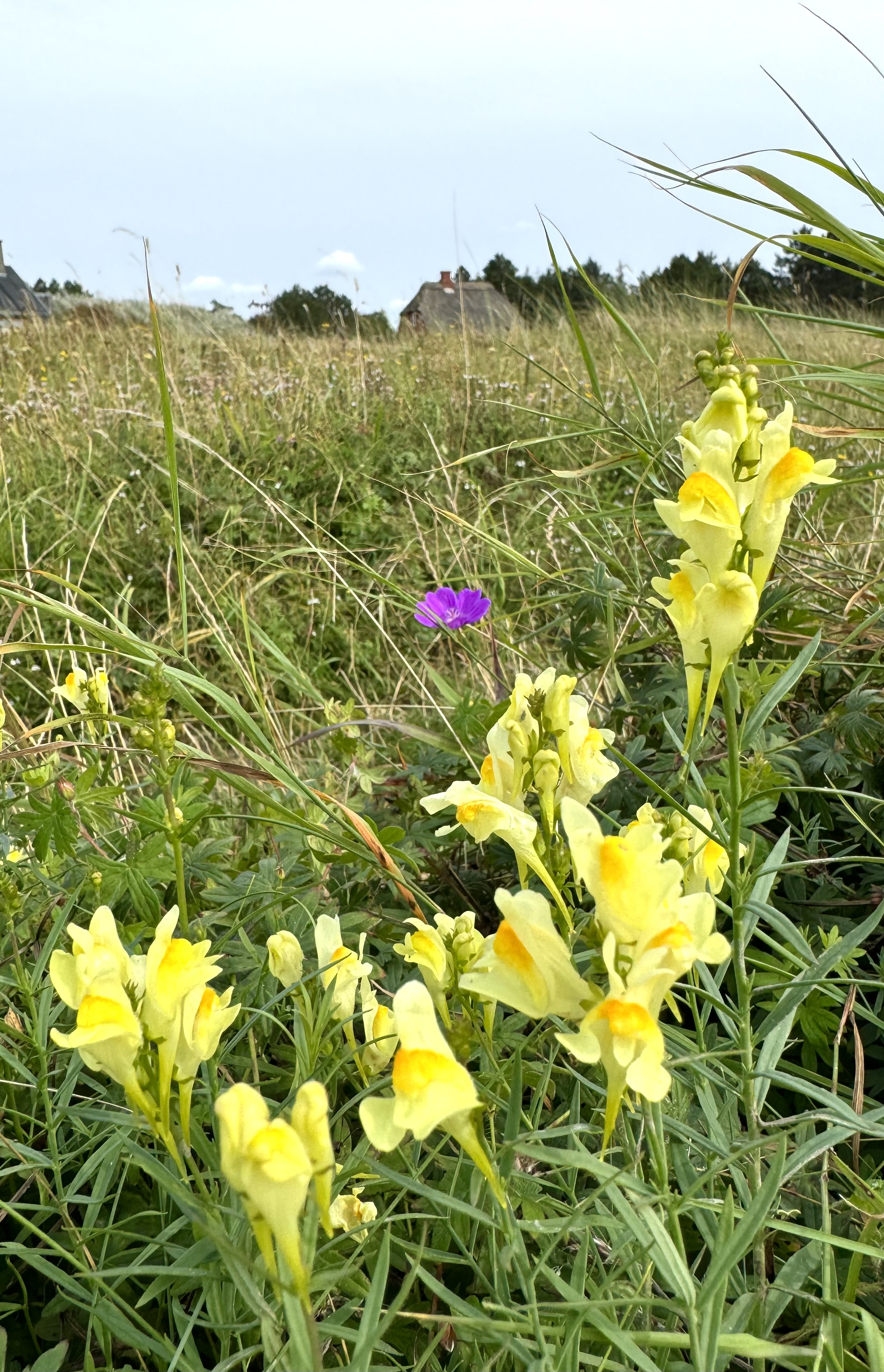
Butter-and-eggs (Linaria vulgaris) at the beach meadows, Stillinge Strand

The beach medows at Stillinge Strand have a unique flora with several rare plants.

== Sport ==
Stage 2 of the 2022 Tour de France vent though Stillinge Strand. The stage was run on Saturday, July 2, 2022. The starting city for stage 2 was Roskilde and the finish city was Nyborg. The route through Stillinge Strand followed the coast along Great Belt along Drøsselbjergvej and Kongsmarksvej.
