= Forlev-Vemmelev =

- Town
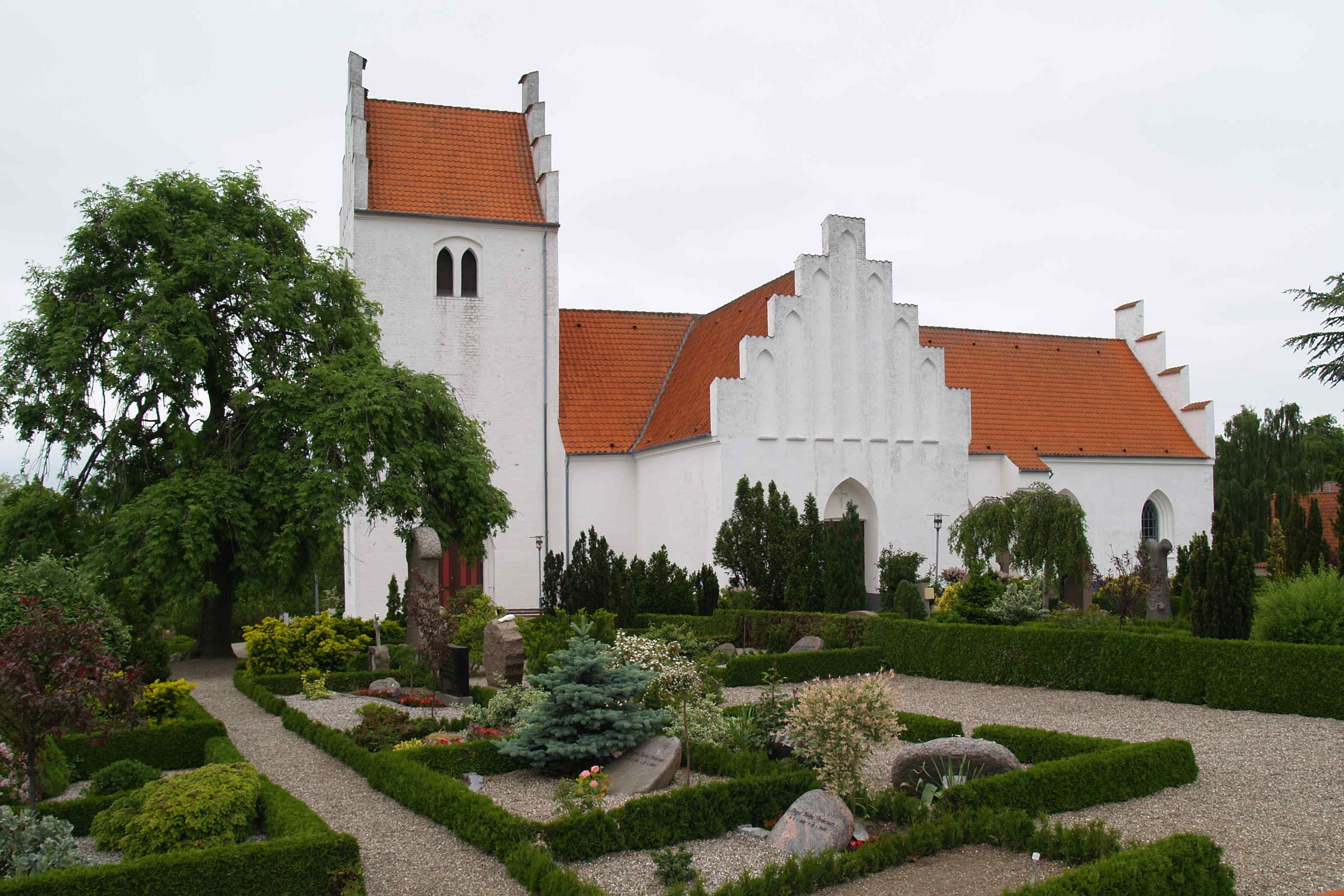
- Vemmelev Church

- Location in Region Zealand Forlev-Vemmelev (Denmark)
- Coordinates: 55°21′55″N 11°15′34″E
- Country: Denmark
- Region: Region Zealand
- Municipality: Slagelse

Area
  - Urban: 1.8 km^{2} (0.69 sq mi)

Population (2026)
  - Urban: 2,555
  - Urban density: 1,400/km^{2} (3,700/sq mi)
- Time zone: UTC+1 (CET)
  - Summer (DST): UTC+2 (CEST)
- Postal code: DK-4241 Vemmelev

Forlev-Vemmelev, also known under the individual names Forlev and Vemmelev, is a town in Zealand, Denmark. It is located in Slagelse Municipality. The two towns of Forlev and Vemmelev have grown together, with the merged town known under all three names. The Statistics Denmark refer to the town as Forlev while Slagelse Municipality refer to it as Vemmelev. Forlev-Vemmelev is located 5 km south-west of Slagelse and 8 km north-east of Korsør.

The northern part of the town is Forlev and the southern part is Vemmelev. The E20 motorway cuts through the two parts of the town, with a bridge connecting them.

== History ==
On 22 January 1916 a Freight train derailed and overturned nine wagons at Forlev station, West Zealand County. The overturned wagons laid across the neighboring track, where they were hit by an oncoming freight train. An iron pipe had slipped between the wagons during the drive and had caused the derailment.

Between 1856 and 1962 a train station was located in Forlev. Forlev was a stop on the West line.

== Notable residents ==
- Christian "Klumben" Andersen (born 1987), musician
