= Boeslunde =

- Village
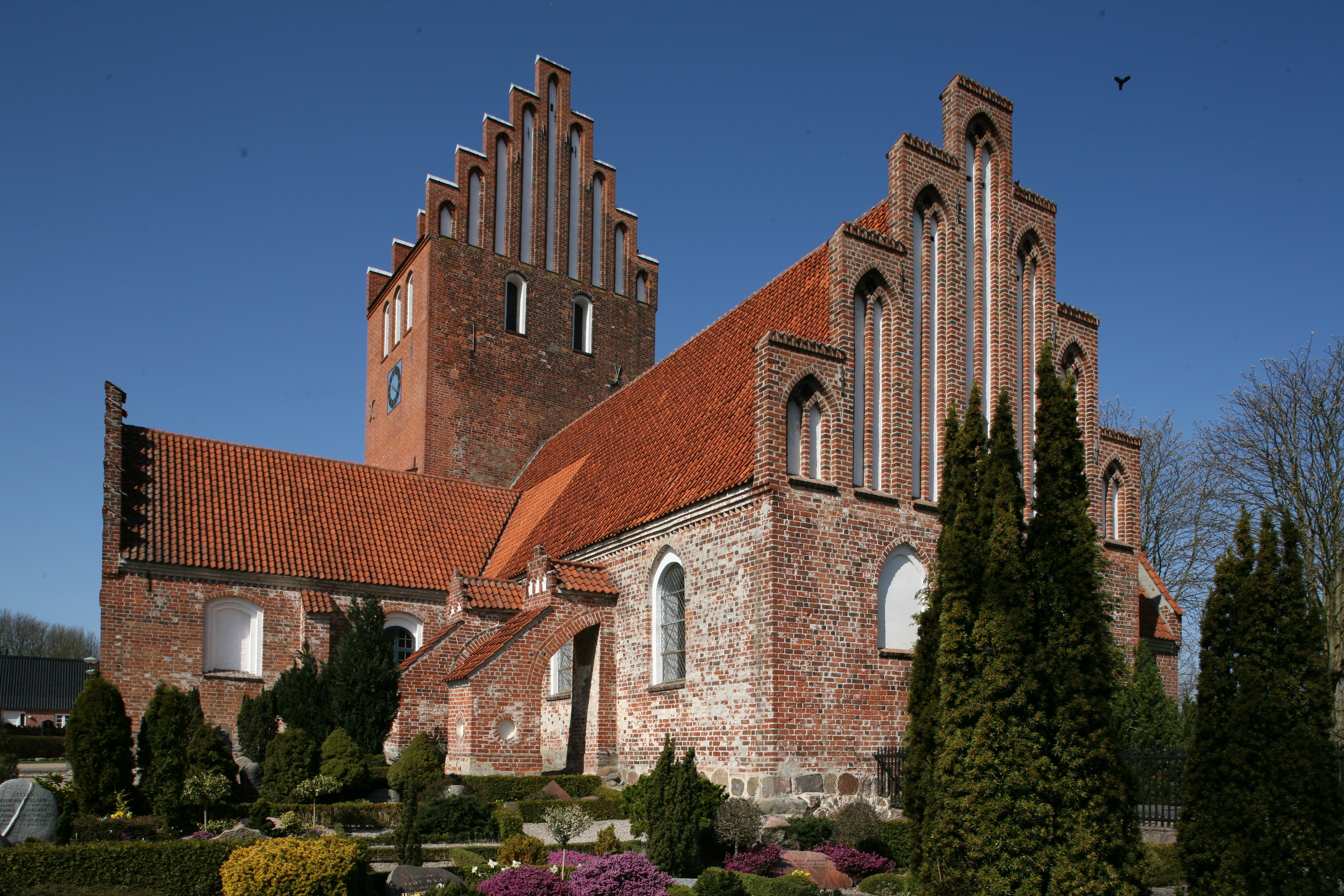
- Boeslunde Church

- Location in Region Zealand
- Coordinates: 55°18′14″N 11°16′4″E
- Country: Denmark
- Region: Region Zealand
- Municipality: Slagelse

Population (2026)
  - Total: 771
- Time zone: UTC+1 (CET)
  - Summer (DST): UTC+2 (CEST)

Boeslunde is a village on Zealand, in Slagelse Municipality, Region Zealand in Denmark. It is located 7 km north of Skælskør, 9 km east of Korsør and 14 km south of Slagelse.

== History ==
Boeslunde and the surrounding area has a history rich in archaeological finds, from the Nordic Bronze Age, the Viking Age and early medieval times. The area near the hill of Borgbjerg Banke was formerly the site of a defence fortress in the 14th century, and in the prehistoric times of the Nordic Bronze Age it was a holy place where votive offerings were made. Many large ceremonial gold rings from 1000-800 BC have been found here among the votive offerings, from the 1800s to the present. Archaeologists has classified them as "oath rings", even though such artefacts are usually associated with the much later Viking Age. In 2015, two thousand gold-spirals from 900-700 BC was excavated. It is a unique find, not seen before, and it is speculated that the spirals was part of a Bronze Age priest-king's ceremonial attire.
