= West Zealand County =

County of Denmark

Coordinates: 55°26′N 11°34′E

West Zealand County Vestsjællands Amt (Danish)
- County of Denmark
- Coat of arms

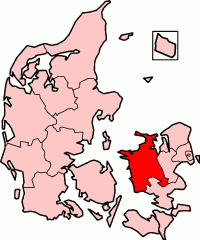
- West Zealand County in Denmark
- Seat: Sorø

Area
  - Total: 2,984 km^{2} (1,152 sq mi)

Population (2006)
  - Total: 307,207
  - Density: 103.0/km^{2} (266.6/sq mi)

West Zealand County (Danish: Vestsjællands Amt) is a former county (Danish: amt) in the west-central part of the island of Zealand (Sjælland) in eastern Denmark. The county was formed on 1 April 1970, comprising a few former counties. The county was abolished effective January 1, 2007, when it merged into Region Sjælland (i.e. Region Zealand).

The county was responsible for public hospitals, upper secondary schools and schools for Higher Preparatory Examination, public transport and social welfare for disabled people.

The County Hall was located in the town of Sorø, and became the seat of the new region. Sorø is by no means the biggest city in West Zealand, but it has great historical value. It is famed for the Sorø Academy (Danish, Sorø Akademi), an educational institution built in 1140 together with the church where Queen Margaret I of Denmark was buried (later moved to Roskilde Domkirke, Roskilde).

Many people who live in West Zealand commute to the greater metropolitan area of Copenhagen for work.

== List of County Mayors ==
From	To	County Mayor
January 1, 1970	September 20, 1974 †	Jørgen Herman Monrad (Venstre)
September 20, 1974	December 31, 1985	Hans Kjeld Brinth (Venstre)
January 1, 1986	December 31, 1989	Søren Eriksen (Social Democrat)
January 1, 1990	December 31, 1993	Henning Tellerup (Conservative)
January 1, 1994	December 31, 2001	Søren Eriksen (Social Democrat)
January 1, 2002	December 31, 2006	Hans Jørgen Holm (Venstre)

== Municipalities (1970-2006) ==
- Bjergsted municipality
- Dianalund municipality
- Dragsholm municipality
- Fuglebjerg municipality
- Gørlev municipality
- Hashøj municipality
- Haslev municipality
- Holbæk municipality
- Hvidebæk municipality
- Høng municipality
- Jernløse municipality
- Kalundborg municipality
- Korsør municipality
- Nykøbing-Rørvig municipality
- Ringsted municipality
- Skælskør municipality
- Slagelse municipality
- Sorø municipality
- Stenlille municipality
- Svinninge municipality
- Tornved municipality
- Trundholm municipality
- Tølløse municipality
