= Louis Zwicki =

Louis Zwicki was a piano manufacturing company that was active from 1899 to the 1970s in Copenhagen, Denmark.

== History ==
The company was founded on 25 October 1899 by pianist and piano builder Louis Zwicky (1867-1926). The company was after his death in 1926 continued by his sons Kai Zwicky (born 1909) and Asger Zwicky (born 1913). The company closed in the 1970s when cheaper imported pianos began to float the Danish market.

== Location ==
The company was headquartered at Købmagergade 65 in Copenhagen, where it also operated a piano store. The piano factory was located at Maglegårds Allé 49 in Søborg.

== See also ==
- Emil Hjorth & Sønner
- Andreas Marschall
