= Skælskør =

- Town
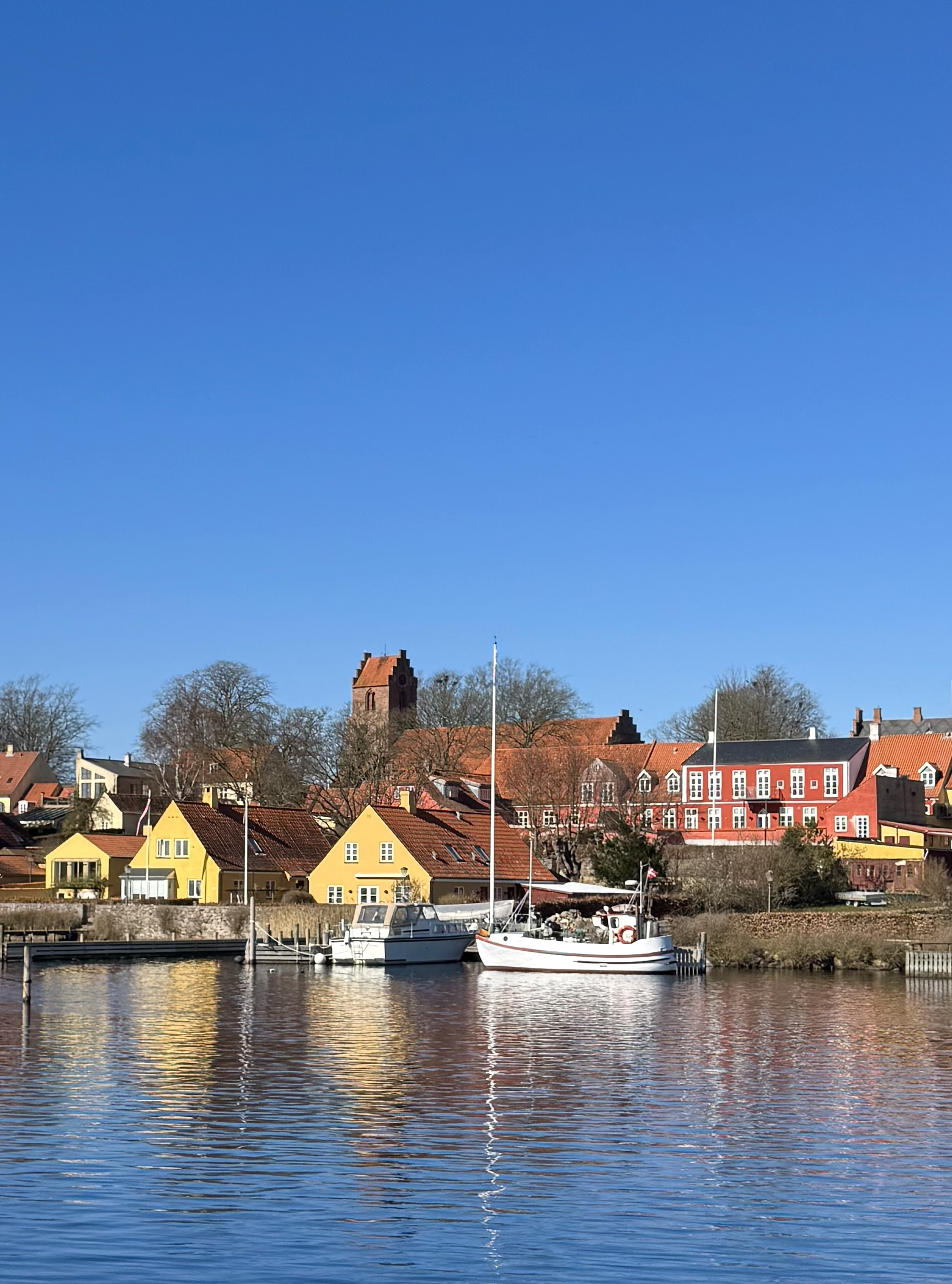
- Skælskør seen from the harbour

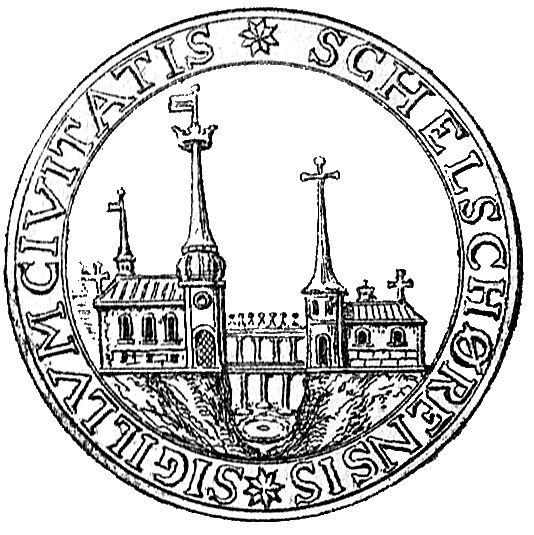
- Seal Coat of arms
- Nickname: The Sunshine Town; Solskinsbyen
- Location in Denmark Skælskør (Denmark Region Zealand)
- Coordinates: 55°15′14″N 11°17′25″E
- Country: Denmark
- Region: Region Zealand
- Municipality: Slagelse
- Parish: Skælskør

Area
  - Urban: 4.3 km^{2} (1.7 sq mi)

Population (2026)
  - Urban: 6,334
  - Urban density: 1,500/km^{2} (3,800/sq mi)
  - Gender: 3,026 males and 3,308 females
- Demonym: Skælskørianer
- Time zone: UTC+1 (CET)
  - Summer (DST): UTC+2 (CEST)
- Postal code: DK-4230 Skælskør
- Calling code: (+45) 58

Skælskør (Danish: [skelˈskøˀɐ̯]) is a town in Zealand, Denmark. It is located in Slagelse Municipality. Until 2007 Skælskør was the seat of Skælskør Municipality. The town is located 17 km southwest of Slagelse and 12 km southeast of Korsør. Skælskør is home to one of Denmark's largest breweries, the Harboe Brewery.

== History ==
Skælskør was already incorporated as a market town by Valdemar II in 1240. The town's market rights were confirmed by Eric VII on 23 December 1414.

Historically Skælskør was a harbour for traffic between Zealand and Funen, but Korsør took over when the harbour there was settled. Skælskør Fjord is difficult to navigate, and was one of the last waters in Denmark that legally required a pilot on recreational boats.

== Saint Nicholas Church ==
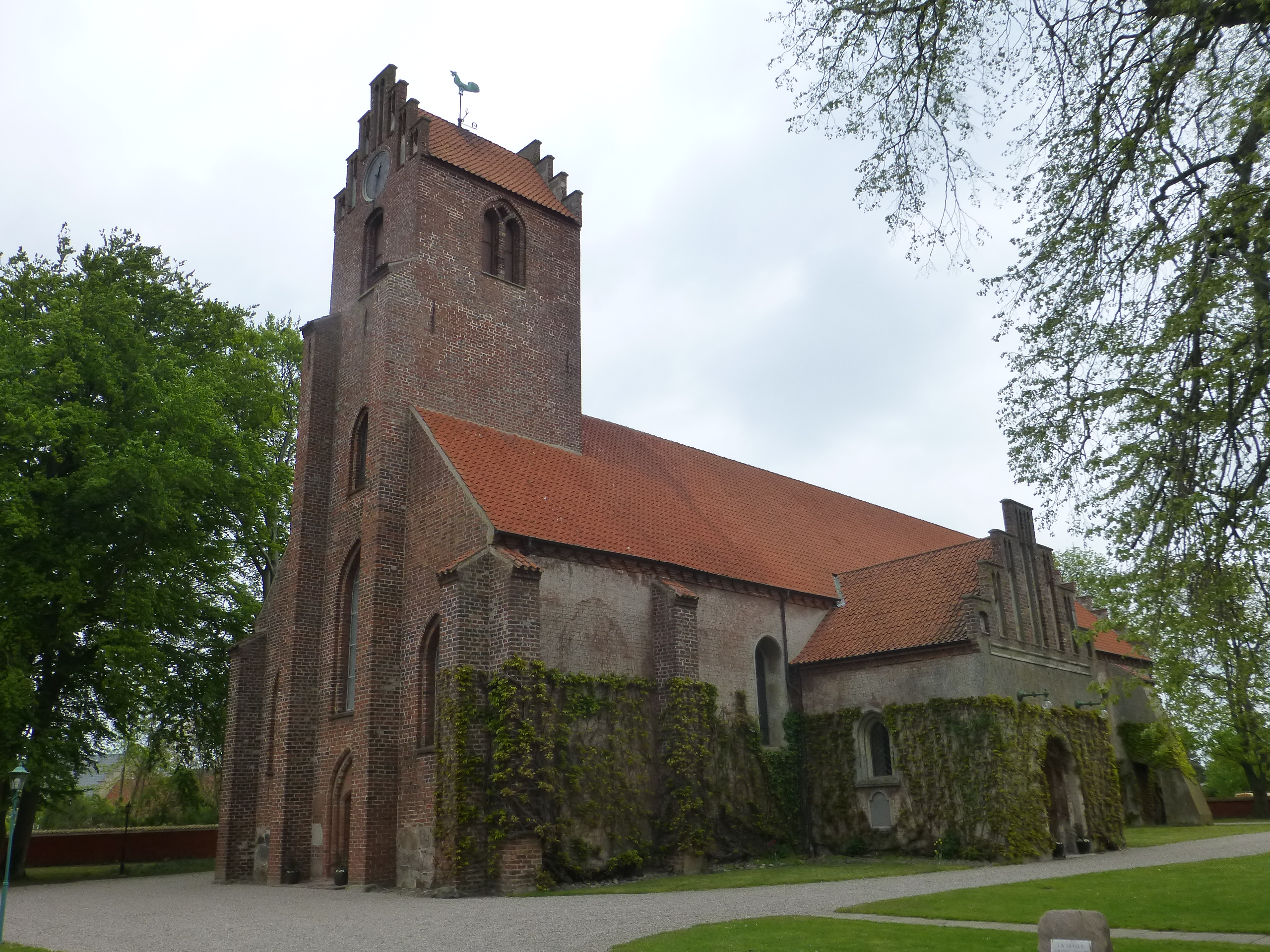
Saint Nicholas Church

Saint Nicholas Church (Danish: Sankt Nicolai Kirke), also known as Skælskør Church, is located centrally in Skælskør. The earliest parts of the church were built in the beginning of the 1200s, with later extensions all built before the 1500s.

The altarpiece is from 1475. The altarpiece depicts the apostles and Jesus' crucifixion. The chalice is from 1729. The baptismal font is from around 1300. The baptismal font lid is from the 1700s. The pulpit is from 1630-1631, and includes figures of Jesus' birth, baptism, walk to Calvary, crucifixion and ascension. The figures are separated by caryatids. There are three church bells. They are from 1516, 1520 and 1562.

The turret clock is in iron and made by Hans Boesen in 1770.

== Notable residents ==
- Andreas Bjørn (1703–1750), merchant and shipbuilder
- Conrad Christian Hornung (1801–1873), piano maker
- Vilhelm Topsøe (1840–1881), author
- Haldor Topsøe (1842–1935), chemist
- Bertel Bruun (1937–2011), conservationist
- Henrik Brodersen (born 1964), politician and MF
- Sannie Charlotte Carlson (born 1970), singer
- Karsten Nielsen (born 1973), rower
- Pernille Rosenkrantz-Theil (born 1977), politician and MF
