= Flakkebjerg =

- Village
- Location in Region Zealand
- Coordinates: 55°18′42″N 11°23′47″E
- Country: Denmark
- Region: Region Zealand
- Municipality: Slagelse

Population (2026)
  - Total: 444
- Time zone: UTC+1 (CET)
  - Summer (DST): UTC+2 (CEST)

Flakkebjerg is a village on Zealand, Denmark. It is located in Slagelse Municipality.

== Flakkebjerg School Museum ==
Flakkebjerg School Museum (Danish: Flakkebjerg Skolemuseum) is a museum located in Flakkebjerg. The museum focuses on schools in the period 1904–1962, and has existed since 1981. It is located in a former school, known as Flakkebjerg Lower Ground School (Danish: Flakkebjerg Forskole).

== Gallery ==
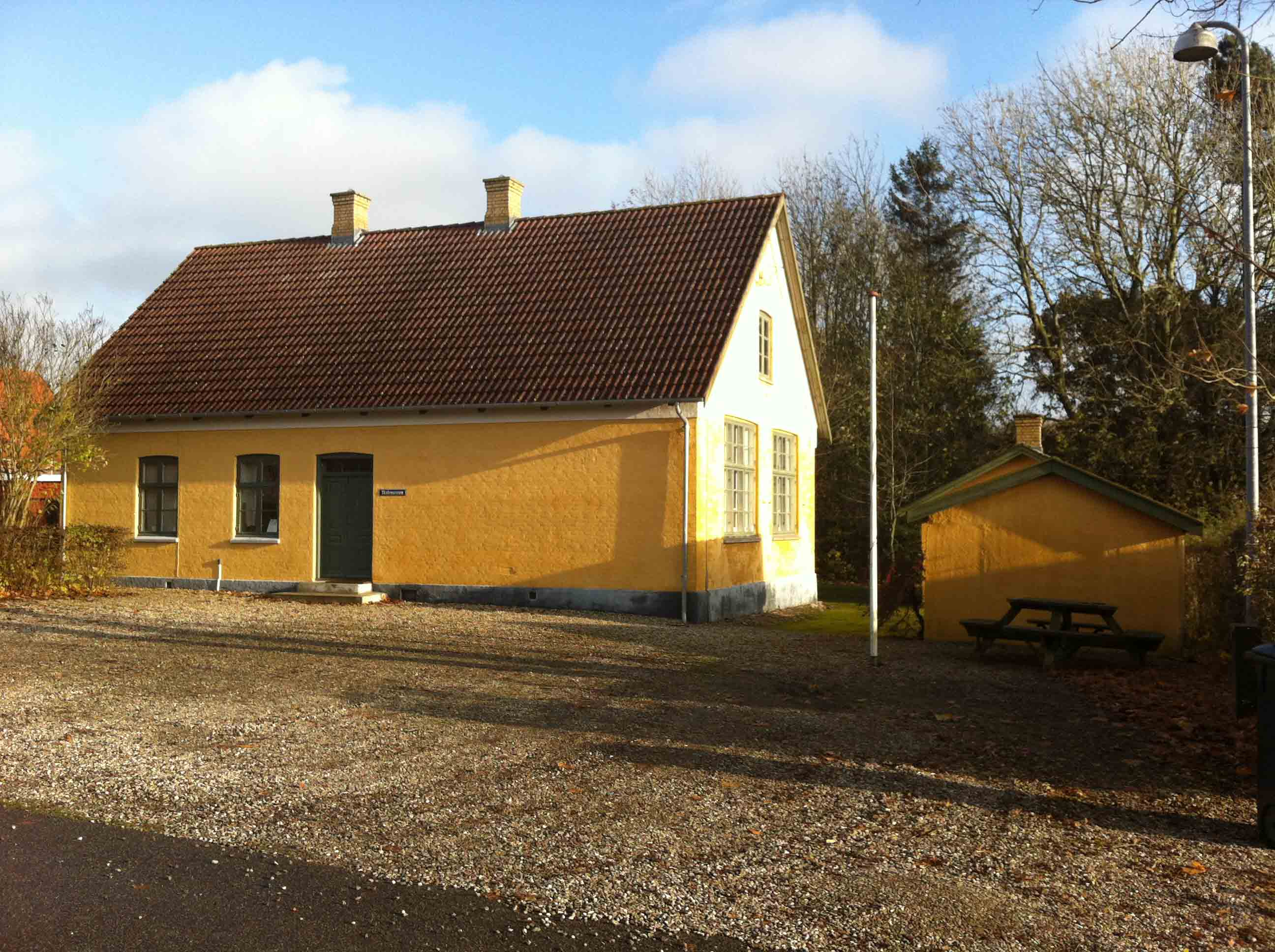
Flakkebjerg School Museum

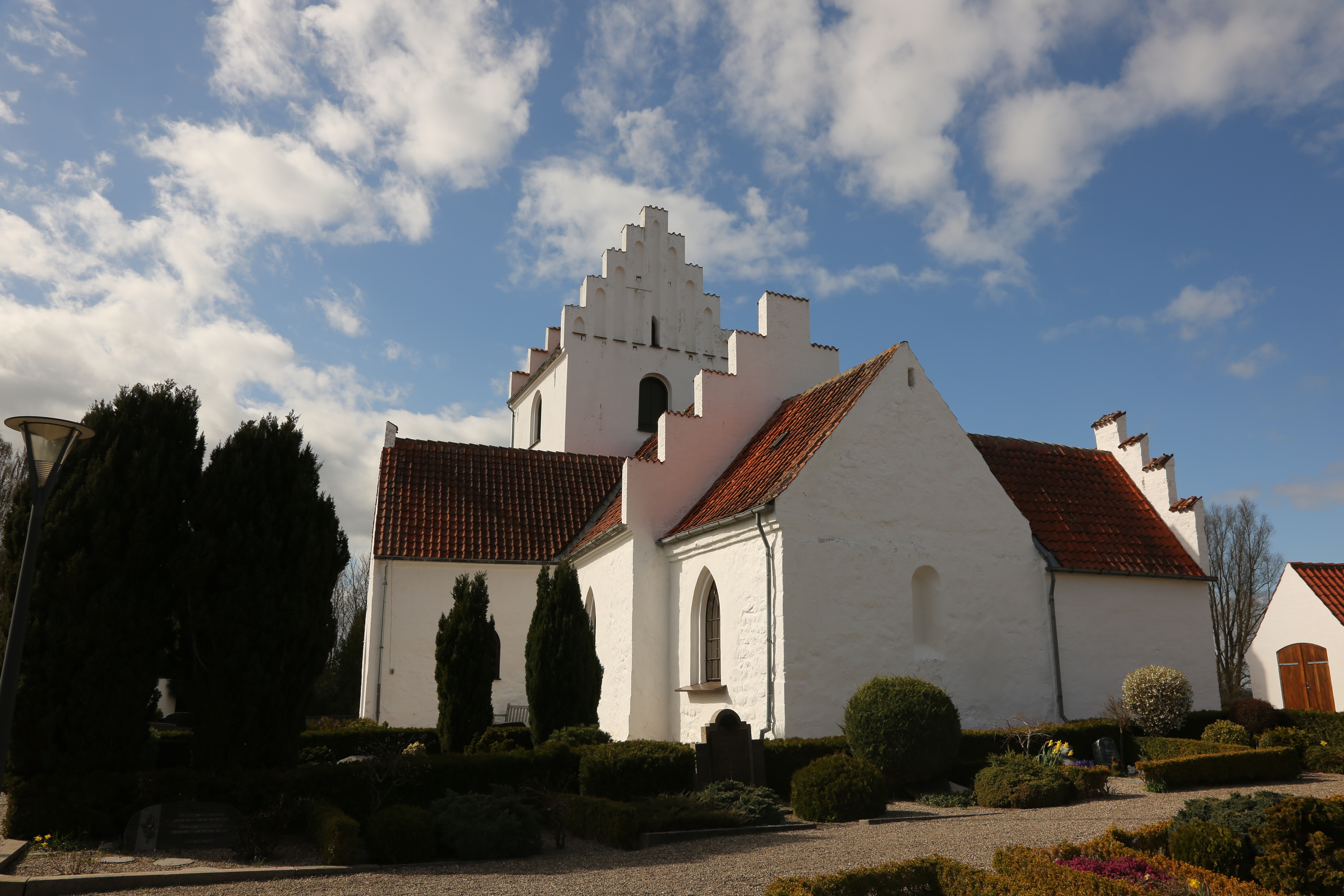
Flakkebjerg Church

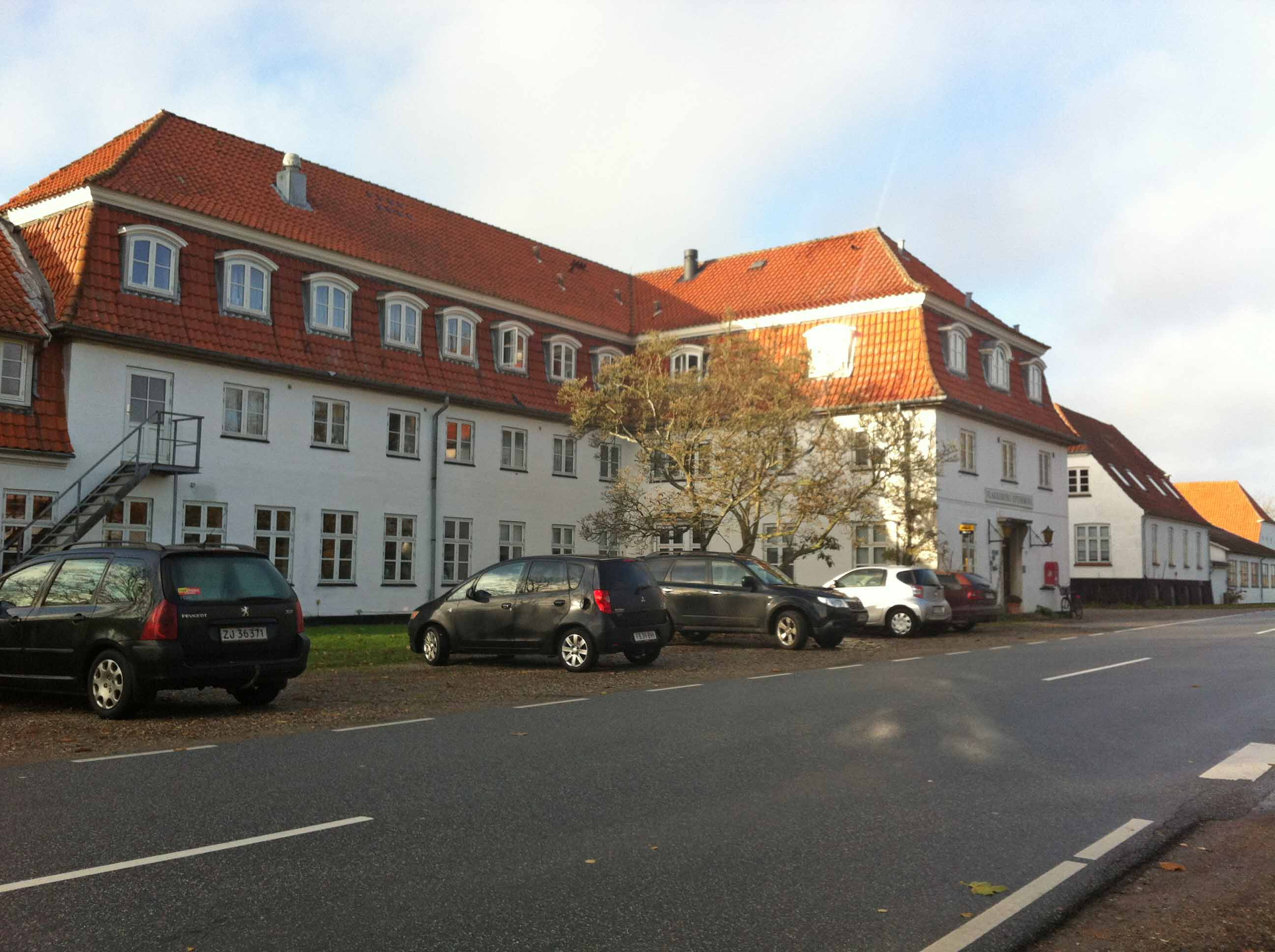
Flakkebjerg Efterskole
