= List of churches in Slagelse Municipality =

This list of churches in Slagelse Municipality lists church buildings in Slagelse Municipality, Denmark.

== List ==
| Name | Location | Year | Coordinates | Image | Refs |
|---|---|---|---|---|---|
| Antvorskov Church | Antvorskov | 2005 | 55°23′15.61″N 11°20′47.65″E | | |
| Boeslunde Church | Boeslunde | c. 1300 | 55°18′5.34″N 11°16′15.34″E | | |
| Eggeslevmagle Church | Eggeslevmagle | c. 1100 | 55°17′9.95″N 11°20′56.4″E | | |
| Flakkebjerg Church | Flakkebjerg | | | | |
| Gerlev Church | Gerlev | c. 1100 | 55°21′9.71″N 11°20′16.43″E | | |
| Gimlinge Church | Gimlinge | | | | |
| Gudum Church | Gudum | | | | |
| Halskov Church | Halskov | | | | |
| Havrebjerg Church | Havrebjerg | | | | |
| Havrebjerg Valgmenighedskirke | Søbrg | | | | |
| Hejninge Church | Hejninge | | | | |
| Church of the Holy Ghost | Slagelse | c. 1100 | 56°03′51.4″N 12°08′27″E | | |
| Hemmeshøj Church | Hemmeshøj | | | | |
| Hyllested Church | Hyllested | | | | |
| Høve Church | Høve | | | | |
| Høve Church | Høve | | | | |
| Høve Valgmenighedskirke | Høve | | | | |
| Kindertofte Church | Kindertofte | | | | |
| Kirke Stillinge Church | Kirke Stillinge | | | | |
| Kirkerup Church | Kirkerup | | | | |
| Lundforlund Church | Lundforlund | | | | |
| Magleby Church | Magleby | | | | |
| St Mikkel's Church | Slagelse | 14th century | 55°24′13.06″N 11°21′16.19″E | | |
| St Nicolas' Church | Slagelse | 13th century | 55°15′14.42″N 11°17′11.9″E | | |
| Nordrupvester Church | Nordtupvester | | | | |
| Ottestrup New Church | Ottestrup | | | | |

== See also ==
- List of churches in Næstved Municipality
