= 1989 Danish local elections =

Regional elections were held in Denmark on 21 November 1989. 4737 municipal council members were elected to the 1990–1993 term of office in the 275 municipalities, as well as 374 members of the 14 counties of Denmark.

== Results of regional elections ==
The results of the regional elections:

=== County Councils ===
| Party | Seats |
|---|---|
| Social Democrats (Socialdemokraterne) (A) | 146 |
| Liberals (Venstre) (V) | 89 |
| Conservative People's Party (Det Konservative Folkeparti) (C) | 53 |
| Socialist People's Party (Socialistisk Folkeparti) (F) | 35 |
| Progress Party (Fremskridtspartiet) (Z) | 23 |
| Social Liberal Party (Det Radikale Venstre) (B) | 10 |
| Christian Democrats (Kristeligt Folkeparti) (Q) | 7 |
| Centre Democrats (Centrum-Demokraterne) (D) | 4 |
| The Greens (De Grønne) (G) | 3 |
| Others | 4 |
| Total | 374 |

=== Municipal Councils ===
| Party | Seats |
|---|---|
| Social Democrats (Socialdemokraterne) (A) | 1753 |
| Liberals (Venstre) (V) | 1261 |
| Conservative People's Party (Det Konservative Folkeparti) (C) | 602 |
| Socialist People's Party (Socialistisk Folkeparti) (F) | 298 |
| Progress Party (Fremskridtspartiet) (Z) | 217 |
| Social Liberal Party (Det Radikale Venstre) (B) | 73 |
| Christian Democrats (Kristeligt Folkeparti) (Q) | 45 |
| Centre Democrats (Centrum-Demokraterne) (M) | 23 |
| Schleswig Party (Slesvigsk Parti) (S) | 9 |
| The Greens (De Grønne) (G) | 7 |
| Communist Party (Kommunistiske Parti) (K) | 6 |
| Common Course (Fælles Kurs) (P) | 2 |
| Others | 441 |
| Total | 4737 |
