= 1993 Danish local elections =

Local elections were held in Denmark on 16 November 1993. 4703 municipal council members were elected to the 1994–1997 term of office in the 275 municipalities, as well as members of the 14 county councils of Denmark.

== Results of regional elections ==
The results of the regional elections:

=== County councils ===
Party	Seats
Social Democrats (Socialdemokraterne) (A)	136
Liberals (Venstre) (V)	125
Conservative People's Party (Det Konservative Folkeparti) (C)	44
Socialist People's Party (Socialistisk Folkeparti) (F)	30
Social Liberal Party (Det Radikale Venstre) (B)	16
Progress Party (Fremskridtspartiet) (Z)	15
Christian Democrats (Kristeligt Folkeparti) (Q)	5
Schleswig Party (Slesvigsk Parti) (S)	1
Red-Green Alliance (Enhedslisten) (Ø)	1
Others	1
Total	374

=== Municipal councils ===
Party	Seats
Social Democrats (Socialdemokraterne) (A)	1700
Liberals (Venstre) (V)	1601
Conservative People's Party (Det Konservative Folkeparti) (C)	493
Socialist People's Party (Socialistisk Folkeparti) (F)	228
Progress Party (Fremskridtspartiet) (Z)	133
Social Liberal Party (Det Radikale Venstre) (B)	80
Christian Democrats (Kristeligt Folkeparti) (Q)	32
Schleswig Party (Slesvigsk Parti) (S)	9
Red-Green Alliance (Enhedslisten) (Ø)	6
Others	421
Total	4703
