= Laurits Hansen =

Danish trade unionist and politician (1894–1965)

Minister of Social Affairs
- In office 1942–1945
- Prime Minister: Erik Scavenius

Personal details
- Born: 24 October 1894 Kelstrup, Kirke Stillinge, Denmark
- Died: 23 February 1965 (aged 70) Copenhagen, Denmark
- Party: Social Democrats (until 1945)

Laurits Hansen (1894–1965) was a Danish trade unionist and politician, being a member of the Social Democrats. He served as minister of social affairs between 1942 and 1945, but he lost his party affiliation following World War II due to the claims that he had not been loyal to his party.

== Biography ==
Hansen was born in Kelstrup, Kirke Stillinge on 24 October 1894. During his youth he was the chairman of the social democratic youth association. He led the trade union movement during the period of the Nazi occupation of Denmark. He was chairman of the Trade Unions Cooperative between 1939 and 1942. He was close to the Germans and negotiated with them about the possibilities of coordinating the Danish trade union movement with the German Nazi Labor Front.

Hansen was made the minister of social affairs in 1942 following the demands of the Nazi figures. He served in the cabinet led by Prime Minister Erik Scavenius. After World War II, he was accused of not being loyalty to the Social Democrats and being a collaborator of the Nazi regime. As a result, he lost all of his party positions. Following this incident he worked as a cigar merchant and then as a real estate broker. He died in Copenhagen on 23 February 1965.
