= Anna Laursen =

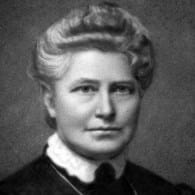
Anna Laursen

Ane (Anna) Marie Laursen née Christensen (1845–1911) was a Danish schoolteacher and women's rights activist. In 1891, she became headmistress of the realskole in Aarhus which was later known as Fru Laursens Skole (Mrs Laursen's School). Founded on Grundtvigian principles, it was one of Denmark's first mixed schools. In 1886, Laursen was a co-founder of the Aarhus branch of the Danish Women's Society. As its president from 1897, she became an early defender of women's suffrage although this was not yet on the Society's official agenda.

== Early life ==
Born on 20 January 1845 in Landsgrav, Slagelse Municipality, in western Zealand, Ane Marie Christensen was the daughter of Peder Christensen (1813–1889), a farmer, and Caroline Marie Jørgensen (1820–1884). She grew up in a rural community where she became familiar with the ideals of N.F.S. Grundtvig. In the early 1870s, she attended Askov Højskole, a folk high school, where she was inspired to devote her life to teaching. Suffering from chest pains, probably tuberculosis, she moved to Copenhagen where she taught in various folk high schools and free schools, followed by a period as head of a children's home on the island of Bornholm. In 1881, she continued her educational studies at N. Zahle's School, after which she taught for a time in a school in Nyborg.

In November 1882, she married Niels Johan Laursen (1855–1930), a theology graduate 11 years her junior. After their wedding, she gave up teaching while he was appointed editor of the newspaper Aarhus Folkeblad. They settled in Aarhus where they soon became key members of the Grundtvigian religious and educational circles.

== Career ==
=== Teaching ===
In 1888, Anna Laursen was engaged as a teacher at a little private school in Aarhus which had been established in 1886. In 1891, her husband bought the school and she became its principal. In 1901, when the school received authorization to hold examinations, it became known as Fru Laursens Realskole.

The school offered a positive contract with most of the other schools of the times. Thanks to the Grundtvigian approach to teaching, teaching was conducted in a vibrant and thoughtful way based on the philosophy of learning for life. It was also the city's first mixed school, bringing girls and boys together in the same classroom. Under Laursen's leadership, the school grew from 30 pupils in 1888 to 260 when she left in 1911.

=== Women's rights ===
Laursen had probably already been involved in the Danish Women's Society while she was in Copenhagen. In 1886, she was one of 15 members who established a branch in Aarhus. From the start, it was suggested she should head the new branch but she refused as she thought her husband's political involvement would create difficulties. A year later she was nevertheless elected president. Under her leadership, evening classes, sewing courses and a reading association were introduced. She also supported votes for women although suffrage had not yet become part of the main organization's official agenda.

Anna Laursen died in Aarhus on 25 July 1911. She was buried in the city's Nordre Kirkegård.
