= Frølunde Fed =

- Village
- Location in Region Zealand
- Coordinates: 55°22′50″N 11°12′21″E
- Country: Denmark
- Region: Region Zealand
- Municipality: Slagelse

Population (2026)
  - Total: 312
- Time zone: UTC+1 (CET)
  - Summer (DST): UTC+2 (CEST)

Frølunde Fed is a village on Zealand, Denmark. It is located in Slagelse Municipality.
