= Slagelse Municipality =

Slagelse Municipality Slagelse Kommune (Danish)
- Municipality
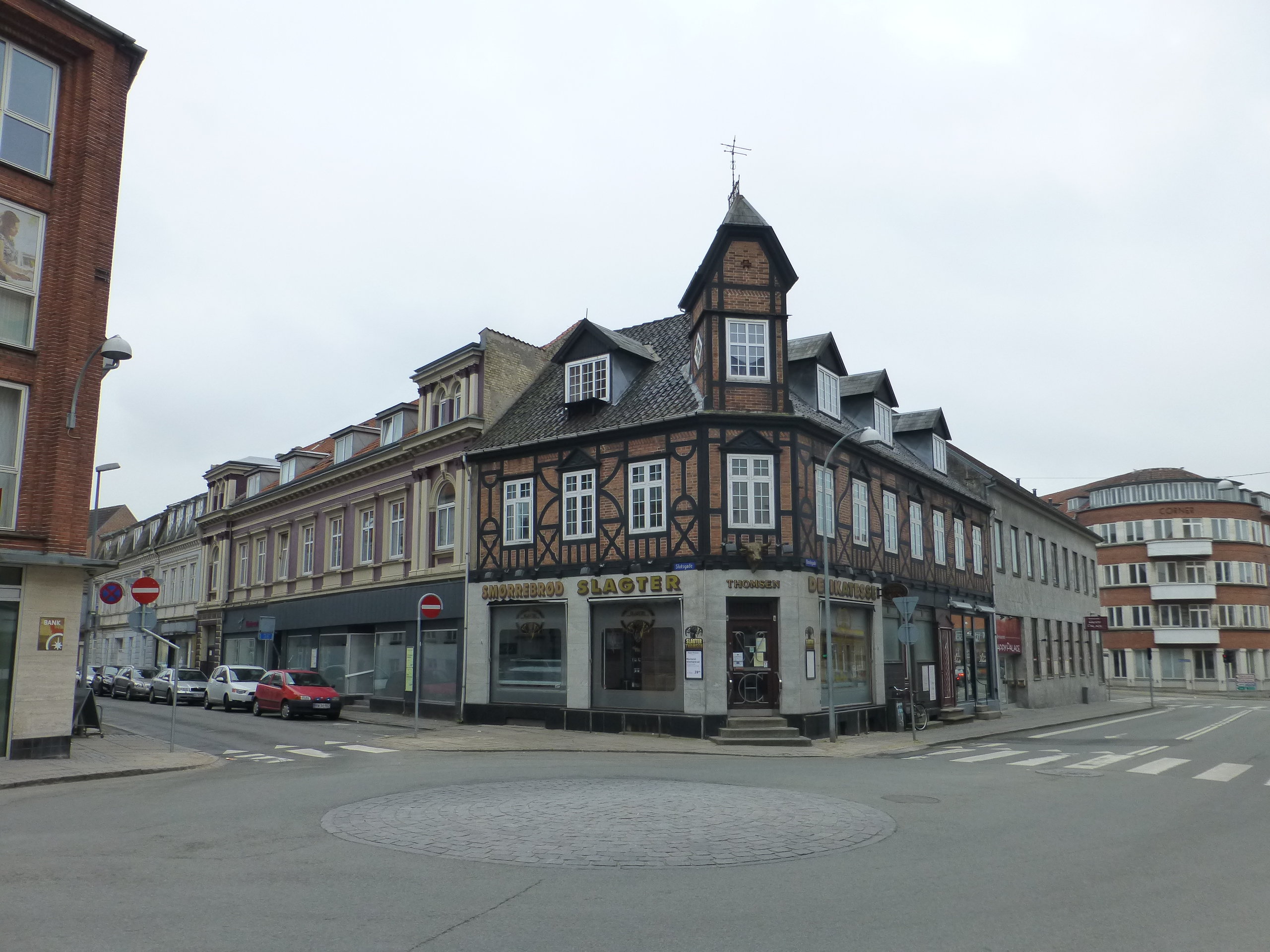
- Street in Slagelse

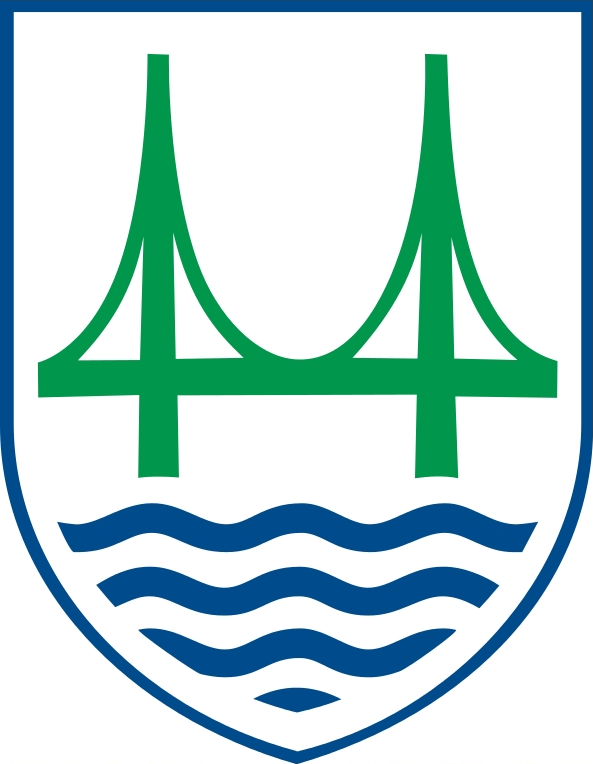
- Coat of arms

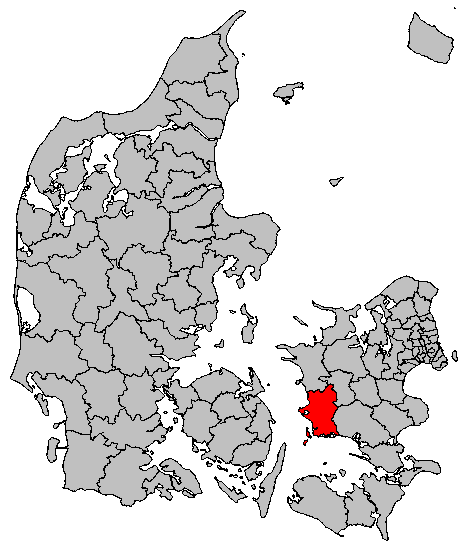
- Country: Denmark
- Region: Zealand
- Established: January 1, 2007
- Seat: Slagelse

Government
  - Mayor: Knud Vincents (V)

Area
  - Total: 567.34 km^{2} (219.05 sq mi)

Population (1 January 2026)
  - Total: 80,959
  - Density: 142.70/km^{2} (369.59/sq mi)
- Time zone: UTC+1 (CET)
  - Summer (DST): UTC+2 (CEST)
- Postal code: 4200
- Municipal code: 330
- Website: www.slagelse.dk

Slagelse Municipality (Danish: Slagelse Kommune, pronounced [ˈslɛːjl̩sə kʰoˈmuːnə]) is a kommune in Region Zealand on the west coast of the island of Zealand in Denmark. The municipality covers an area of 571 km^{2}. The municipality borders Kalundborg Municipality to the north, Sorø Municipality to the north-east, Næstved Municipality to the south-east and connects to Nyborg Municipality via the Great Belt Bridge.

The main city and the site of the municipal council is the city of Slagelse. The mayor was earlier John Dyrby Paulsen, a member of the Social Democratic political party.

The municipality include the inhabited islands of Omø, Agersø and Glænø, as well as the uninhabited islands of Sprogø, Østerfed, Stenfed, Ormø, Fuglehøj, Sandholm, Kidholm and Fugleholm.

On 1 January 2007 the former Slagelse municipality was, as the result of Kommunalreformen ("The Municipal Reform" of 2007), merged with Hashøj, Korsør, and Skælskør municipalities to form an enlarged Slagelse municipality.

== History ==
Slagelse has existed since the 1000s, and coins have been minted there since Cnut the Great's time. It was granted the status of market town by Eric V in 1288. Skælskør was given market town status in 1414. Korsør was granted the same status in 1425. While Slagelse and Skælskør were already important locations before becoming a market town, with the ring castle of Trelleborg located next to Slagelse, Korsør was a more insignificant town before becoming a market town. Korsør's location quickly made it an important town for ferry services to Nyborg on Funen. The three towns became competitors for the land and resources. Korsør's importance as a way to get to Funen allowed Korsør to be favoritized over Slagelse until the 1600s. The town remained small, but fared better than Slagelse, who was struggling. This was also linked to Korsør's access to the sea, giving them a variety of opportunities and privileges, including being able to ship out the grain from many farm areas on western Zealand, leaving them in conflict with the neighboring towns. Slagelse's economy was meanwhile mainly based on artisanry and tobacco. Skælskør was a lesser part of the conflict on western Zealand.

Through the Middle Ages the three towns remained market towns, with the remaining territory of the current municipality going under the administrative hundreds of Slagelse Hundred and Vester Flakkebjerg Hundred. These belonged to the syssel of Vestersyssel. In 1660 the syssel was changed and split up into two counties (Danish: amter). These were Antvorskov County and Korsør County, and they approximately made up the current borders of Slagelse Municipality. In 1798 these counties were merged with Sorø County. In the 1970 Danish Municipal Reform the administrative division of the region was changed again. Market towns were dissolved, and Slagelse instead became the seat of the new Slagelse Municipality. Korsør became the seat of Korsør Municipality, Skælskør of Skælskør Municipality and Dalmose of Hashøj Municipality. All four municipalities were in the new West Zealand County. In the Municipal Reform of 2007 these four municipalities were merged to form the current municipality, which became a municipality in the new Region Zealand.

=== Historical divisions ===
The table below shows the historical municipal subdivisions of Slagelse Municipality.

Historical municipal divisions of Slagelse Municipality
2007	1970	1966	1922	1875	1843	1842	1425	1414	1288	Towns
Slagelse Mun.	Slagelse Mun.	Slagelse Market Town Mun.			Slagelse Market Town					Slagelse
Slagelse Mun.	Slagelse Mun.	St. Michael's Rural Parish Mun.								Slagelse
Slagelse Mun.	Slagelse Mun.	St. Peter's Rural Parish Mun.								Slagelse
Slagelse Mun.	Slagelse Mun.	Havrebjerg Parish Mun.								Havrebjerg
Slagelse Mun.	Slagelse Mun.	Stillinge Parish Mun.								Kirke Stillinge
Slagelse Mun.	Slagelse Mun.	Stillinge Parish Mun.								Stillinge Strand
Slagelse Mun.	Slagelse Mun.	Stillinge Parish Mun.								Kongsmark Strand
Slagelse Mun.	Slagelse Mun.	Hejninge Parish Mun.								Hejninge
Slagelse Mun.	Slagelse Mun.	Vestermose Parish Mun.	Sønderup-Nordrupvester Parish Mun.							Sønderup
Slagelse Mun.	Slagelse Mun.	Vestermose Parish Mun.	Gudum Parish Mun.							Gudum
Slagelse Mun.	Slagelse Mun.	Vestermose Parish Mun.	Sorterup-Ottestrup Parish Mun.							Ottestrup
Slagelse Mun.	Slagelse Mun.	Vestermose Parish Mun.	Kindertofte Parish Mun.			Pedersborg-Kindertofte Parish Mun. (Note: Also part of today's Sorø Municipality.)				Kindertofte
Slagelse Mun.	Hashøj Mun.	Hashøj Parish Mun.	Sørbymagle-Kirkerup Parish Mun.							Sørbymagle
Slagelse Mun.	Hashøj Mun.	Hashøj Parish Mun.	Slots Bjergby-Sludstrup Parish Mun.							Slots Bjergby
Slagelse Mun.	Hashøj Mun.	Hashøj Parish Mun.	Lundforlund-Gerlev Parish Mun.							Gerlev
Slagelse Mun.	Hashøj Mun.	Hashøj Parish Mun.	Skørpinge-Fårdrup Parish Mun.							Skørpinge
Slagelse Mun.	Hashøj Mun.	Hashøj Parish Mun.	Høve-Flakkebjerg Parish Mun.							Flakkebjerg
Slagelse Mun.	Hashøj Mun.	Hashøj Parish Mun.	Gimlinge Parish Mun.							Dalmose
Slagelse Mun.	Hashøj Mun.	Hashøj Parish Mun.	Hyllested Parish Mun.							Hyllested
Slagelse Mun.	Korsør Mun.	Korsør Market Town Mun.			Korsør Market Town					Korsør
Slagelse Mun.	Korsør Mun.	Tårnborg Parish Mun.								Svenstrup
Slagelse Mun.	Korsør Mun.	Tårnborg Parish Mun.								Frølunde Fed
Slagelse Mun.	Korsør Mun.	Vemmelev-Hemmeshøj Parish Mun.								Forlev-Vemmelev
Slagelse Mun.	Skælskør Mun.	Skælskør Parish Mun.	Skælskør Market Town Mun.	Skælskør Market Town Mun.	Skælskør Market Town					Skælskør
Slagelse Mun.	Skælskør Mun.	Skælskør Parish Mun.	Skælskør Market Town Mun.	Skælskør's Rural Parish Mun.						Skælskør
Slagelse Mun.	Skælskør Mun.	Skælskør Parish Mun.	Tjæreby Parish Mun.							Tjæreby
Slagelse Mun.	Skælskør Mun.	Skælskør Parish Mun.	Magleby Parish Mun.							Magleby
Slagelse Mun.	Skælskør Mun.	Skælskør Parish Mun.	Eggeslevmagle Parish Mun.							Eggeslevmagle
Slagelse Mun.	Skælskør Mun.	Skælskør Parish Mun.	Boeslunde Parish Mun.							Boeslunde
Slagelse Mun.	Skælskør Mun.	Skælskør Parish Mun.	Agersø Parish Mun.							Agersø By
Slagelse Mun.	Skælskør Mun.	Skælskør Parish Mun.	Omø Parish Mun.							Omø By
Slagelse Mun.	Skælskør Mun.	Holsteinborg Parish Mun. (Note: Also part of today's Næstved Municipality.)								
Slagelse Mun.	Skælskør Mun.	Holsteinborg Parish Mun.	Ørslev-Sønder Bjerge Parish Mun.							Ørslev
Slagelse Mun.	Skælskør Mun.	Holsteinborg Parish Mun.	Holsteinborg-Venslev Parish Mun.							Bisserup
Slagelse Mun.	Skælskør Mun.	Holsteinborg Parish Mun.	Holsteinborg-Venslev Parish Mun.							Rude

== Towns ==
Below are all settlements in the municipality with populations of at least 200 people (populations as of 2020).

Slagelse	34,015
Korsør	14,608
Skælskør	6,455
Forlev-Vemmelev	2,525
Svenstrup	1,856

Sørbymagle	1,100
Dalmose	988
Slots Bjergby	864
Boeslunde	765
Kirke Stillinge	674

Bisserup	523
Flakkebjerg	445
Havrebjerg	395
Stillinge Strand	351
Rude	272

Frølunde Fed	252
Kongsmark Strand	237

=== Slagelse ===
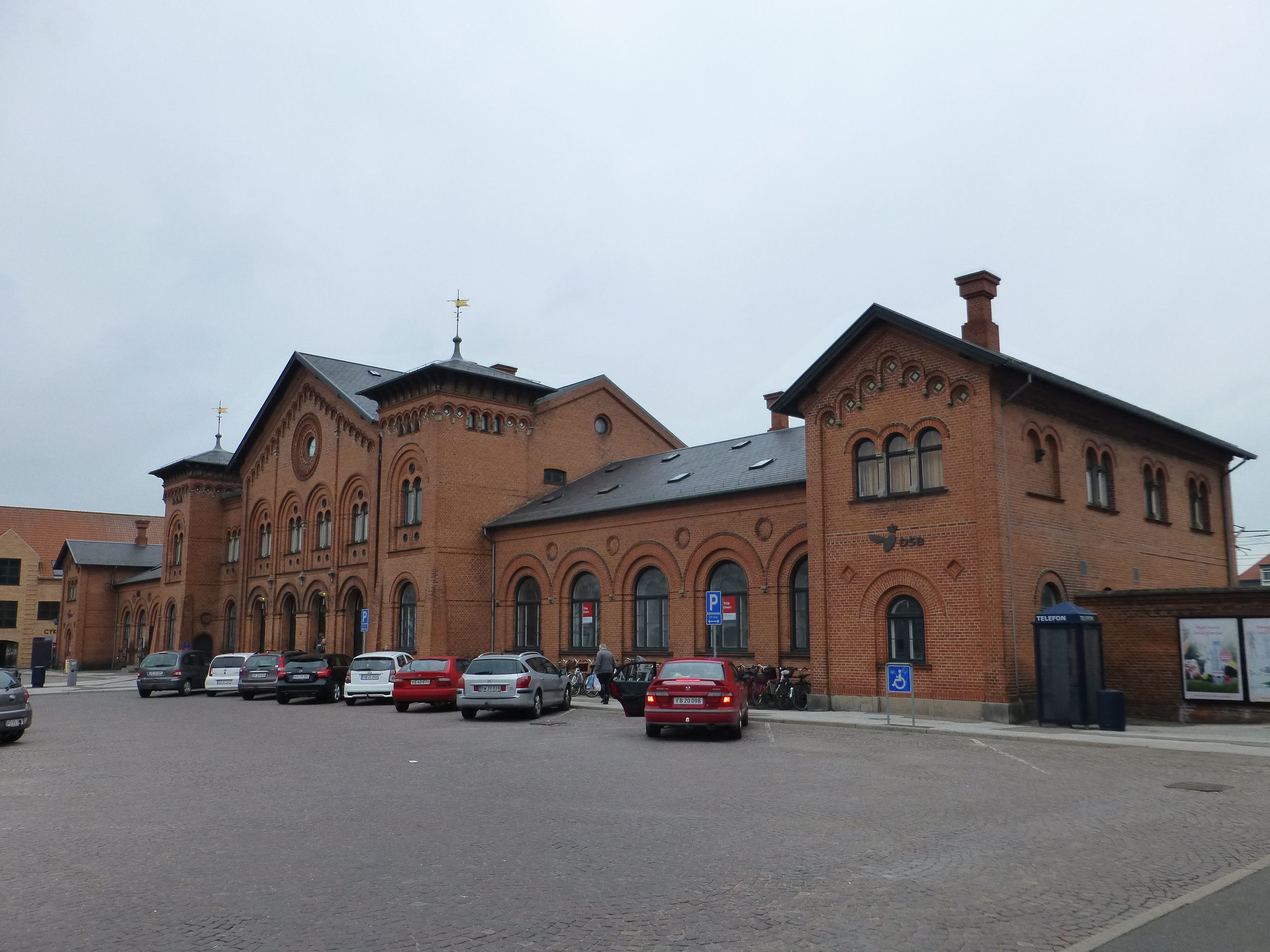
Slagelse Station.

Slagelse is the largest city in the municipality, and is the seat of the municipal council. It is the 21st largest city in Denmark. The city's largest attractions include the sizable shopping center West Zealand Center (Danish: Vestsjællandscenteret), the ruins of Antvorskov and the nearby ring castle of Trelleborg.

Slagelse is located around 15 km east of Korsør and 17 km north-east of Skælskør. 13 km east of Slagelse is Sorø, 33 km north is Kalundborg and 32 km south-east is Næstved. Slagelse borders a large forest area to the south-east, with the closest parts of the forest known as Slagelse Lystskov. Antvorskov barracks and the village of Harrested is located to the south, while the rest of the city borders fields.

Antvorskov and the ruins of the Antvorskov Monastery is located in the southern part of the town, where a school and a large supermarket is also located. The police department of the municipality is also located in the southern part of the town, as is Antvorskov Church. The south-western part of the city consist of residential areas and a number of large shops. The western side of the town is mainly residential with a small industrial area. Also to the west, though closer to the center of the city, is Slagelse Gymnasium and the surrounding educations and schools, including a large vocational school. The hiking trail and former railway Fodsporet cut through the south and western parts of Slagelse. The northern parts of Slagelse have large residential and industrial areas, and is also the location of the Danish Welfarehistorical Museum, several schools and a vocational school. To the east is Skovsø, which is a village that has mostly grown together with Slagelse and is home to many industries. A golf course is also located in Skovsø. Next to Skovsø, at the south-east of Slagelse, are mostly residential areas, and further towards the town center is Slagelse Hospital. The center of Slagelse is the home to a large number of shops, restaurants, cafés and services. Slagelse Library, Slagelse Museum, Slagelse Train Station, the town hall and two churches are located around the center of the city. The West Zealand Center (Danish: Vestsjællandscenteret) is a shopping center originating from 1969 and is also located at the center of the town.

=== Korsør ===
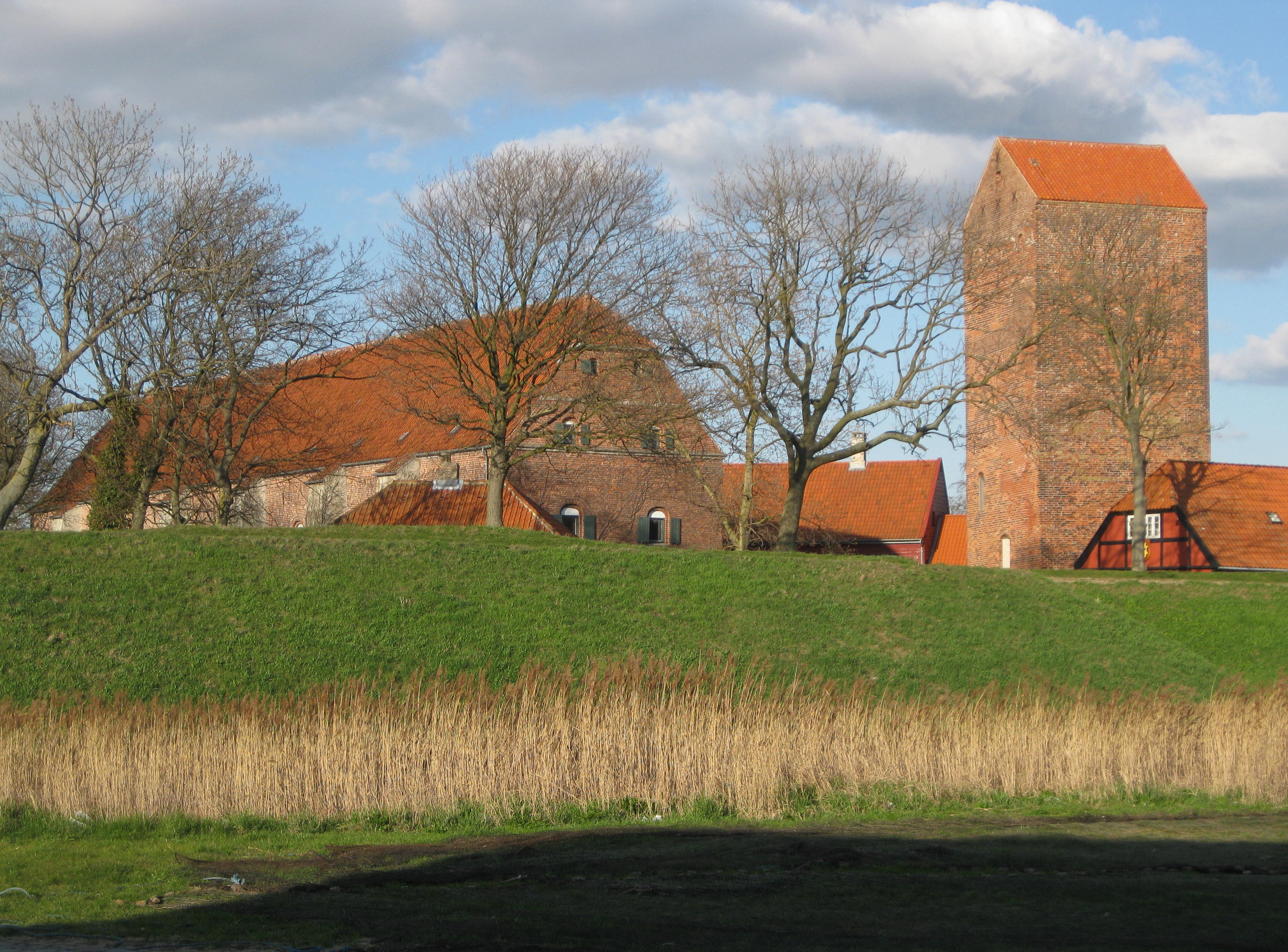
Korsør Fortification.

Korsør is located on the south-western tip of Zealand, connecting to Nyborg through the Great Belt Bridge. The city is split in two by the Korsør Nor fjord. The northern half of the city is known as Halsskov, and is home to Korsør Train Station, located in the outskirts of Halsskov, near the village of Stibjerg Huse. Halsskov is home to a small industrial area, a harbour, Halsskov Church, a sizable camping and vacation center and a number of cultural facilities, including a library. The southern half of Korsør is known by the city's name, and is home to a naval base, a harbour, St Povls Church and a small industrial area. The Danish Maritime Authority has its headquarter in Korsør. Also located in the city is Korsør Fortification (Danish: Korsør Fæstning), where a castle from the 1200s used to be located. It was torn down in the start of the 1800s, but the fortifications remain.

=== Skælskør ===
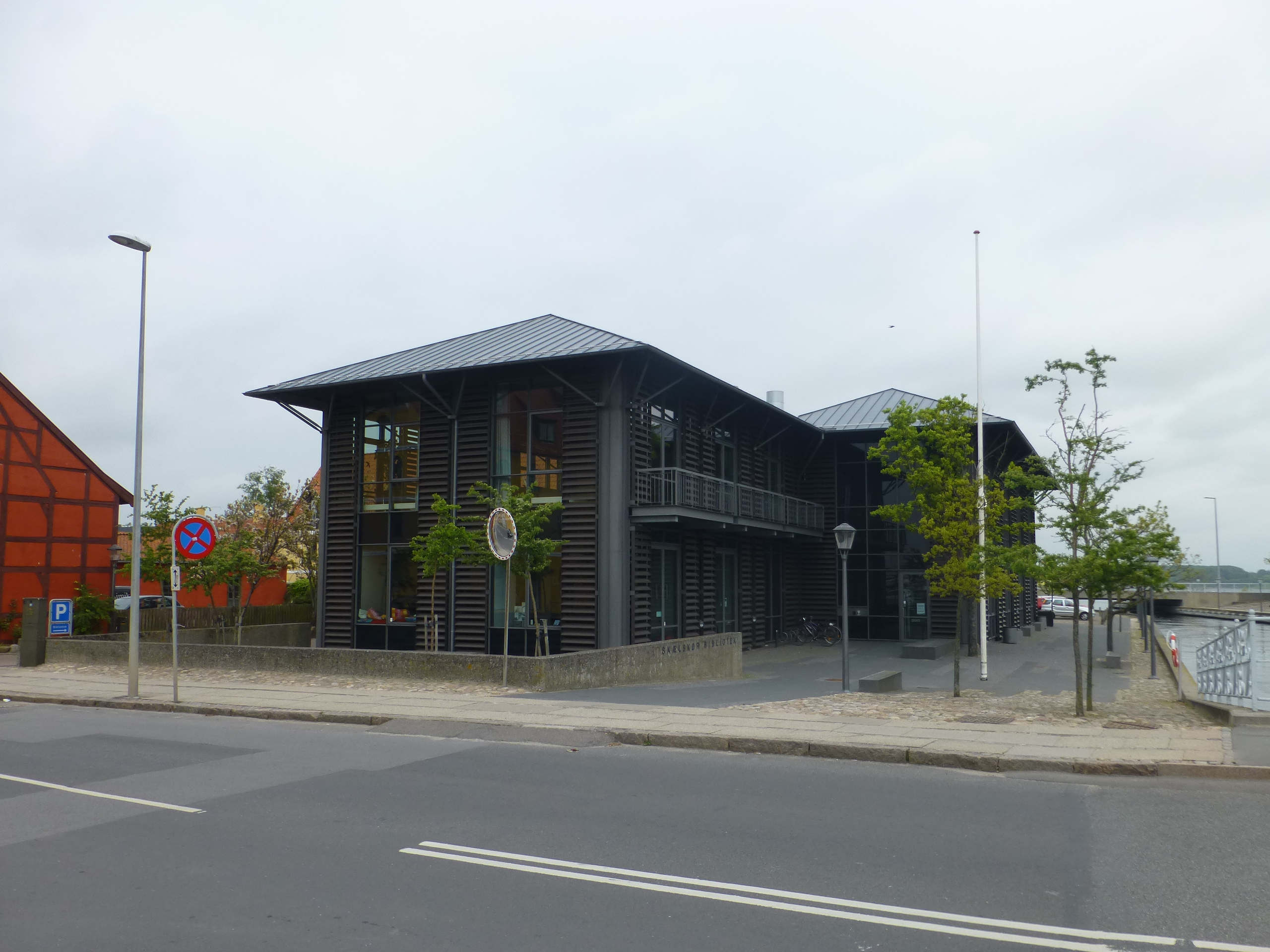
Skælskør Library.

Skælskør is located south-east of Korsør and south-west of Slagelse. It borders the fjord of Noret, which goes through the town and split it in two. Skælskør Church is located in the western part of the town. In the eastern part is a sizable industrial area. Denmark Bus Museum is located in Skælskør. The village and beach of Kobæk Strand is located 1 km west of Skælskør.

=== Forlev-Vemmelev ===
Forlev-Vemmelev (also known under the individual names Forlev and Vemmelev) are two towns that have grown together. The merged town is referred to under all three names. The Statistics Denmark refer to the town as Forlev while Slagelse Municipality refer to it as Vemmelev. The E20 motorway cut through the town, with the former Forlev located north of the motorway and Vemmelev south of it. A bridge connects the two sides of the town. Vemmelev Church is located in Vemmelev.

=== Villages ===
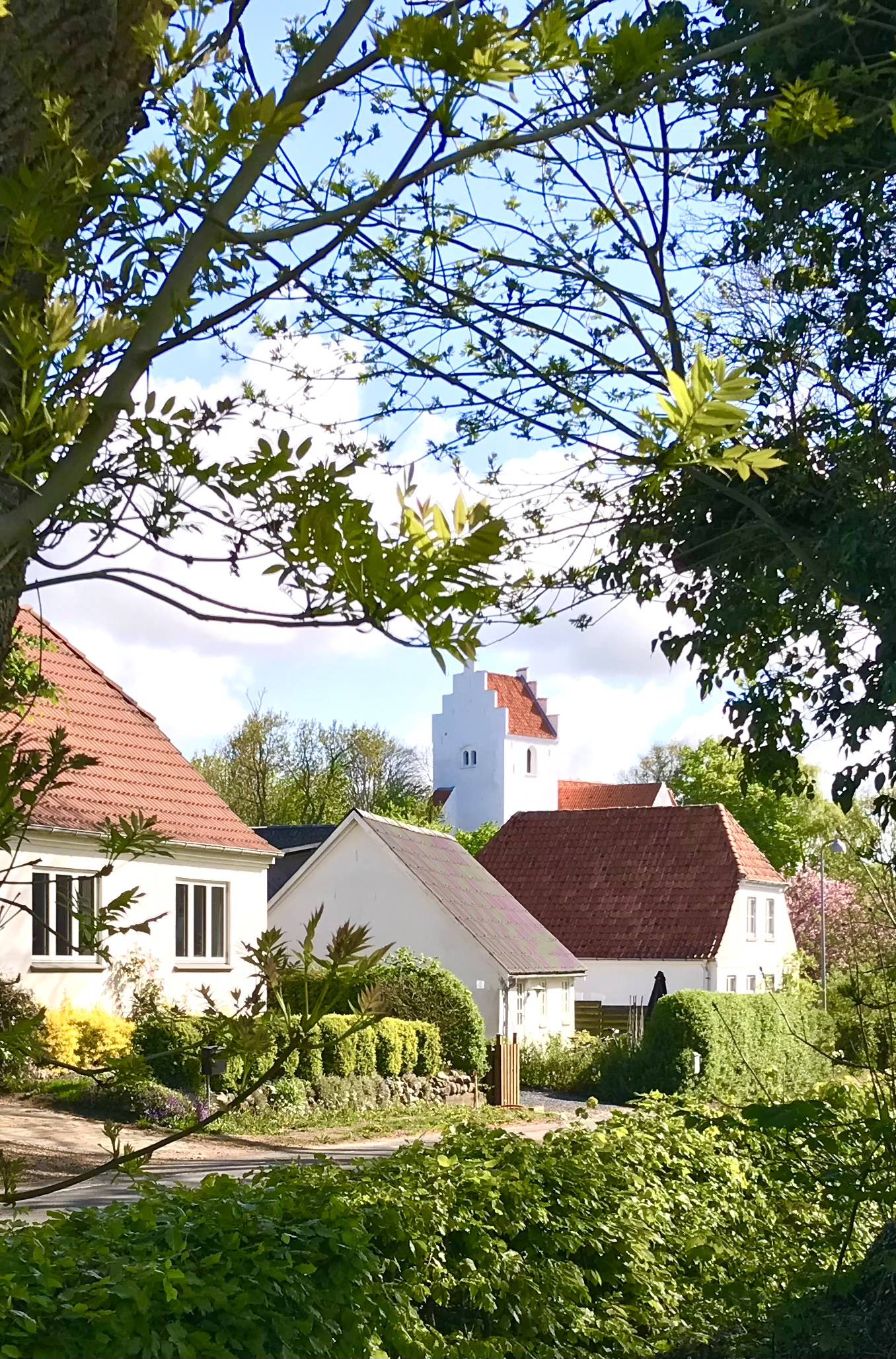
Slots Bjergby

The large size and population of the municipality mean that there are many small villages and settlements in the municipality.

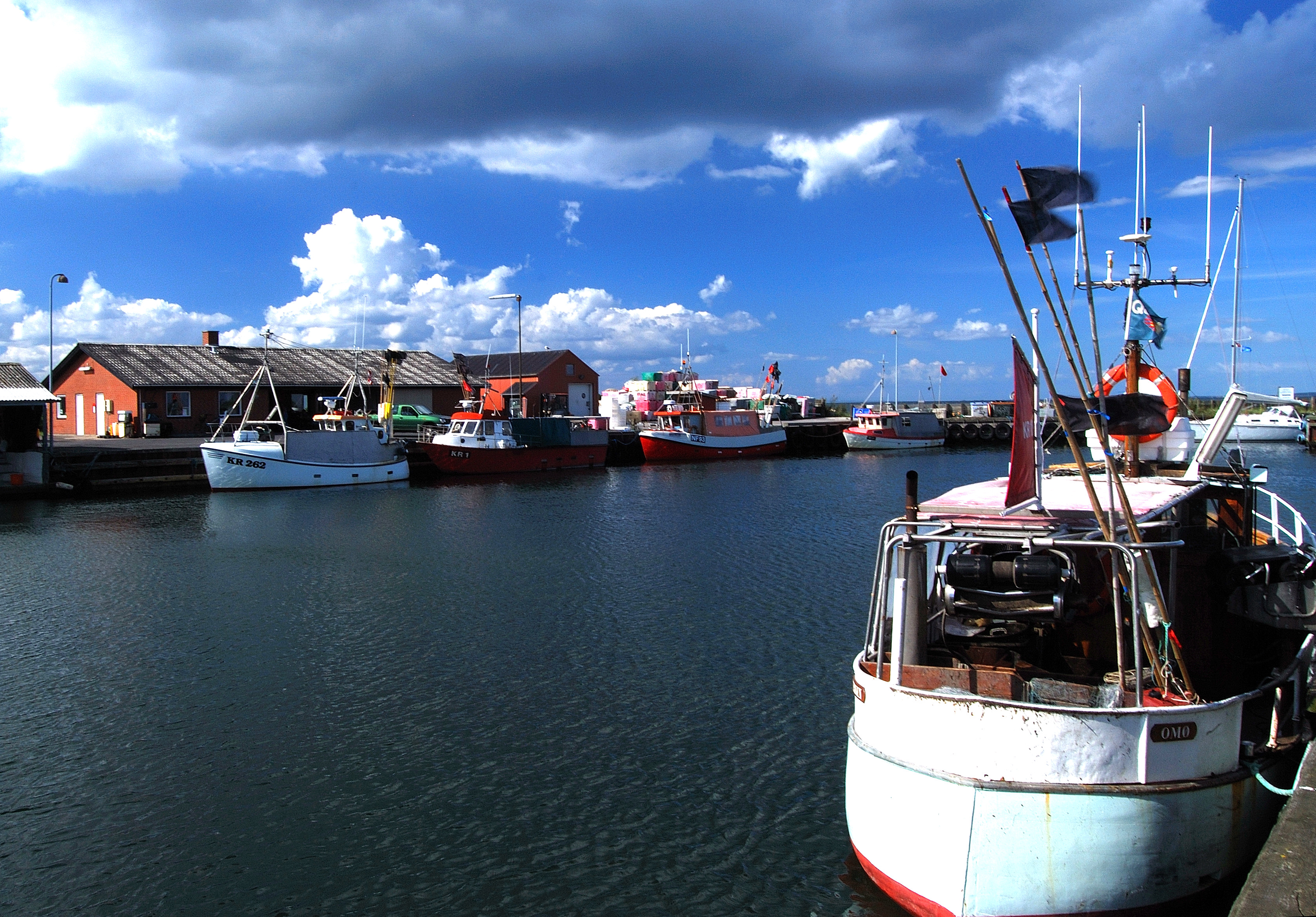
Omø Harbour in Kirkehavn.

Slots Bjergby is a village located ca. 2 km south of Slagelse. The village, which has also had the names of Bjergby and Munke Bjergby, is home to the highest located church on Zealand, 77.5 meters above sea level.

Fladholte is a small village located 12 km south-east of Slagelse. The village is located on the border to Næstved Municipality. In the village is the largest private collection of military vehicles in the Nordic countries, in a museum called PanzerMuseum East. The museum display various types of military vehicles, two helicopters and a Bac 1-11 passenger plane is also displayed in the museum.

Kirkerup is a small village located 10 km south-east of Slagelse who in 2023 received major media and police attention after a child abduction.

Årslev is located 6 km north of Slagelse. Outside the village, to the east, is a permanent circus and amusement park called Arena Cirkusland, home to Cirkus Arena.

Omø By is the main settlement on the island of Omø, with the other settlement on the island called Kirkehavn (or Omø Kirkehavn). Omø Church is located in Omø By.

The main settlement on the island of Agersø is called Agersø By. Agersø Church and Agersø Mill are located here.

The island of Glænø is inhabited, though there are no named settlements on the island.

In addition to these villages, there are a number of smaller settlements in the municipality. These are all the settlements with populations of less than 200 people:

Agersø By
Apager
Askegårde
Attekøb
Atterup
Bankehuse
Barkemose Huse
Bejlevad
Bildsø
Bildsøstrand
Birkemose
Bjergby Mark
Bjergby Overmark
Bjærup
Blæsinge
Bøgelunde
Bøstrup
Bøstrup Overdrev
Båslunde
Dragshuse
Dævdivsrød
Egerup

Eggeslevlille
Eggeslevmagle
Erdrup
Erdrup Enghave
Esholte
Eskilstrup Overdrev
Firhuse
Fladholte
Flakkebjerg Stationsby
Forlev Mærsk
Fornetofte
Frankerup
Frederikslund
Fårdrup
Fårevadskrog
Gadehuse
Gasekær Huse
Gedehave
Gerdrup Ravnemark
Gerlev
Gimlinge
Gimlinge Enghave

Glænø
Gryderup
Grøfte
Gudum
Halkevad
Hallelev
Hallelev Huse
Harrested
Hejninge
Hemmeshøj
Hulby
Huse Herrestrup
Hyldemark
Hyllerup
Hyllested
Hyllested Enghave
Høve
Indelukket
Jernbjerg
Kagsmark
Kelstrup
Kelstrup Strand

Kildehuse
Kildemark
Kindertofte
Kirkehavn
Kirkerup
Kirkerup Mark
Kirkerup Overdrev
Klarskov
Knivkær
Kobæk Strand
Kokkehuse
Krogen
Krænkerup
Lille Flakkebjerg
Lille Valby
Lorup
Lundby
Lundforlund
Lundstorp
Lunghuse
Lynghuse
Løvesbjerg Gårde

Madslunde
Magleby
Magleby Ravnemark
Mindeshoved
Munkebjerg
Neble Lyng
Nordrup
Nordskov
Noret
Nybro
Nyvang
Næsby Fed
Næsby Huse
Næsby Overdrev
Næsby ved Stranden
Næsbyskov
Ollerup
Olstrup
Omø By
Oreby
Oreby Huse
Ormeslev

Ottestrup
Plessens Overdrev
Rappenborg
Rennebjerg
Rosted
Rydemark
Rødkulle Huse
Råbjerg
Seerdrup
Sibberup
Skaftelev
Skaftelevgårdshuse
Skalsbjerg
Skovsø Lillevang
Skætholm
Skørpinge
Slagstrup
Sludstrup
Snekkerup
Sorterup
Stegerset
Store Kongsmark

Stubberup
Stude
Stærremark
Søhuse
Sønder Bjerge
Sønder Jellinge
Søndermark
Sønderup
Sønderupsønder
Sørbylille
Sørbymagle Overdrev
Tangen
Teglværkshuse
Tinghuse
Tjæreby
Tranderup
Trælleborg Gårde
Tystofte
Tyvelse
Vedbynørre
Vedbysønder
Vedskølle

Vejlager
Venslev
Venslev Enghave
Vester Bøgebjerg
Vestermark
Vollerup
Vollerup Gårde
Vårby Mark
Ærtebjerg
Øksnebjerg
Ørslev
Øster Bøgebjerg
Øster Stillinge
Østerhoved
Årslev

== Nature ==
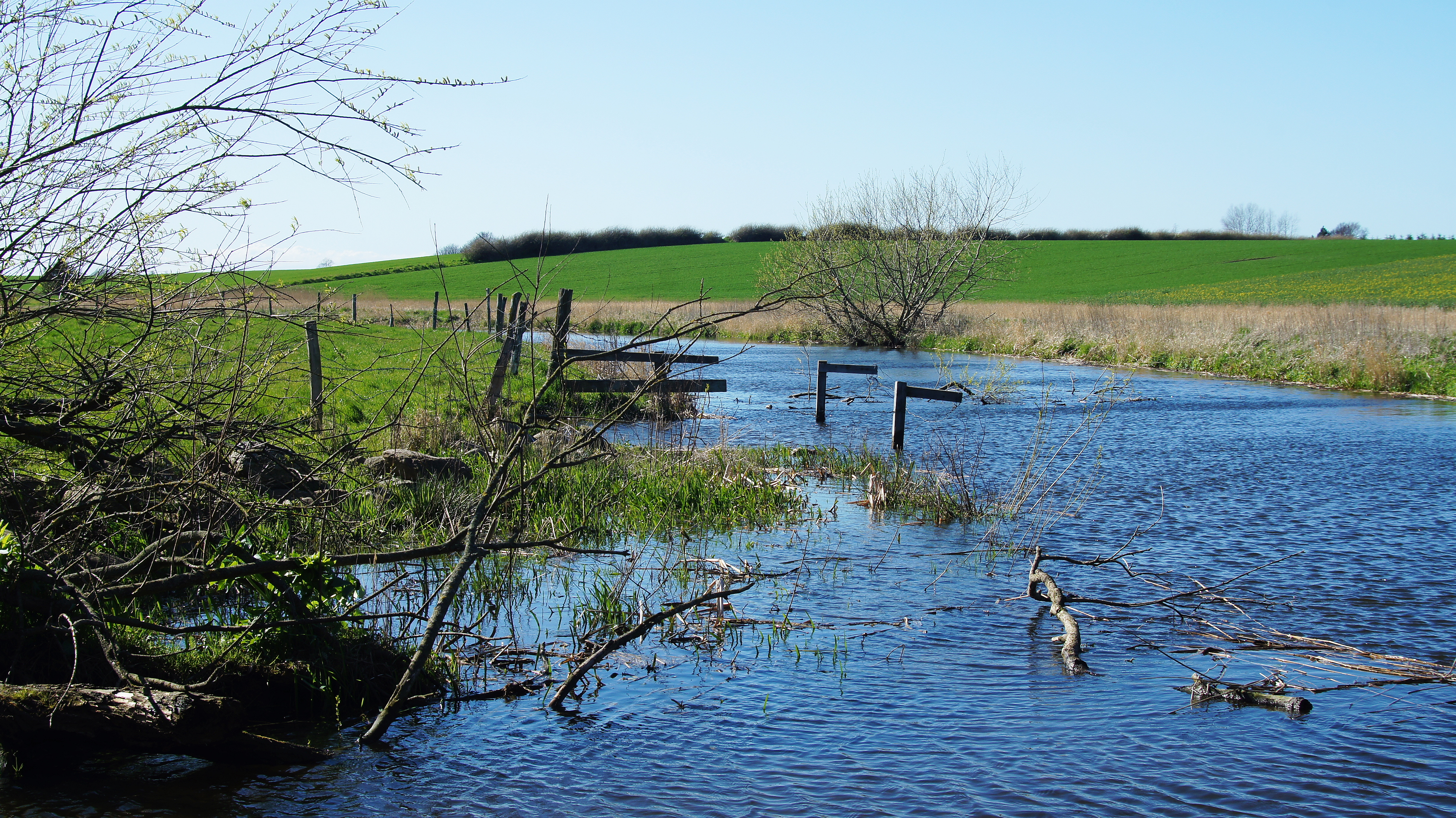
Tude Å.

Most of the land in the municipality are used for agriculture, leaving little territory for nature. The municipality does have a long coastline with many important spots for especially birds, and there are also a series of forests located around in the municipality.

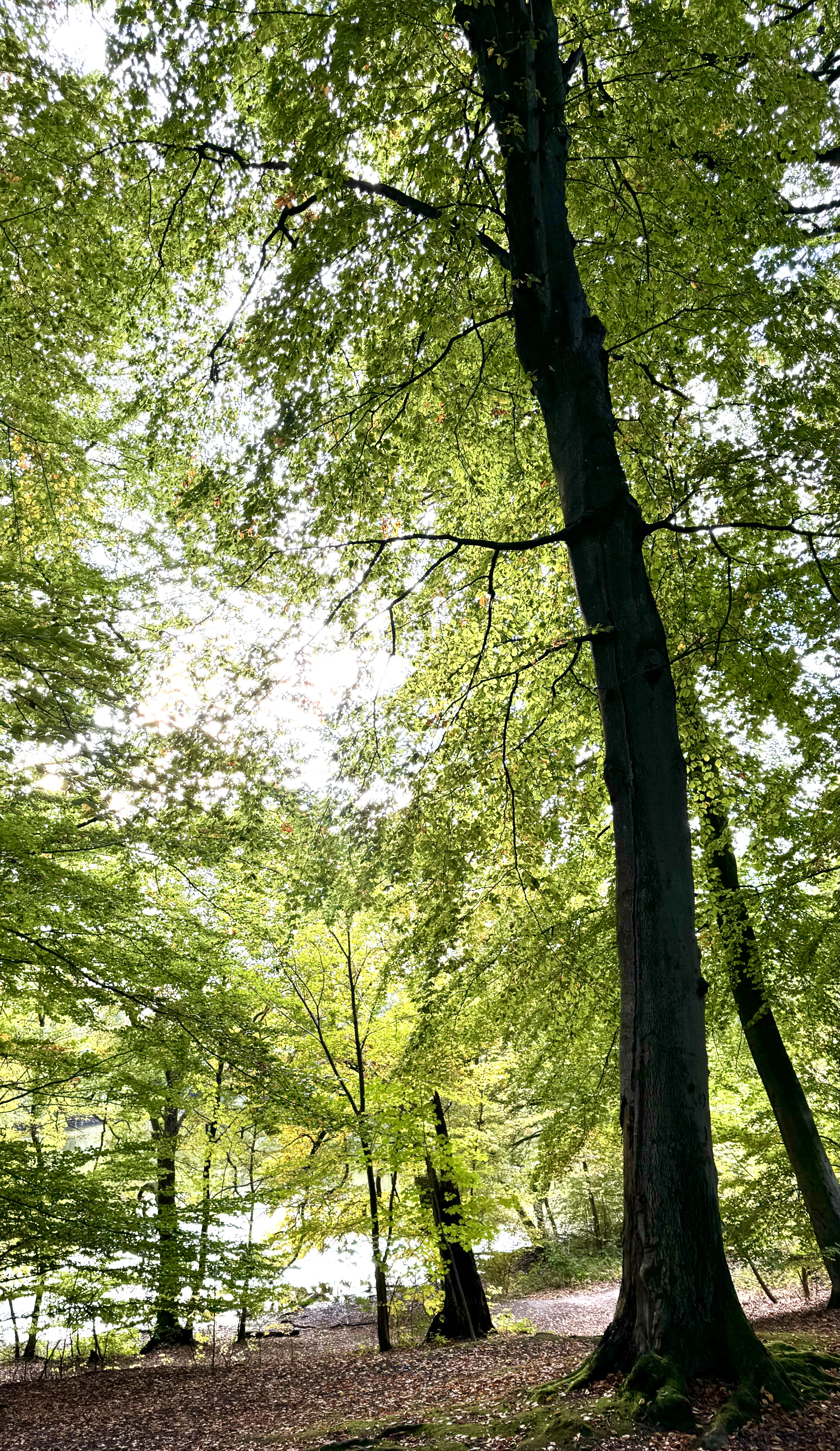
Slagelse Lystskov

The Slagelse Forests (Danish: Slagelseskovene) is a number of forests that are more or less grown together and form one of the largests forests in Denmark. These forests are Slagelse Lystskov, Charlottedal Skov, Nykobbel, Valbygård Skov, Treskelskov, Sønder Overdrev and Falkensten Skov. The trees in the forests are mainly broad-leaved trees dominated by beech. There are also areas dominated by Pinales. Several dolmens can be found in the forest. Common birds found in the forest include common buzzard, Eurasian sparrowhawk, common raven, Eurasian woodcock, black woodpecker and tawny owl.

Tude Å is a river spanning from Trelleborg near Slagelse and out to the coast between Frølunde Fed and Næsby Strand. 208 acres around the river have been protected since 1991. This area is known as Tude Ådal. The river's significance in terms of flora and fauna is limited, but it is a historically important place due to its close ties to Trelleborg and the Vikings.

100 acres around the hill of Tårnbjerg were protected in 1993. The hill borders Korsør Nor and is located east of Korsør, west of Tårnby and south-east of Svenstrup and Frølunde.

In the south-west of Slagelse Municipality, bordering Skælskør to the south, is the peninsula of Stignæs. 1,215 acres are protected. The protection was carried out over two stages, first in 1978 and then in 1987. The areas covered in the protection are Stigsnæs, Borreby and Basnæs Nor. The nature of the peninsula include forests, bogs and beach meadows. Doronicum pardalianches is a rare plant in Denmark that can be found on the peninsula. The peninsula is used by many migrating birds, and there are high populations of birds of prey, mainly common buzzard and European honey buzzard. The peninsula is the only breeding spot for the black-tailed godwit on Zealand.

=== Glænø and the fjords ===
Glænø is located between the fjords of Holsteinborg Nor and Basnæs Nor, with the smaller fjord of Øksenæs Nor located further west. Not all territory in the three fjords are protected, but they are all bird sanctuaries with strict rules in regards to hunting in the area. Parts of Øksenæs Nor is protected under the Stignæs protection, while 276 acres in and around Holsteinborg Nor have been protected since 1936. The Holsteinborg Nor protection also covers the small islands of Ormø and Fuglehøj.

An old-growth forest is located on Ormø, where a large great cormorant colony also breeds. Around 5% of the breeding great cormorants in Denmark breed on Ormø. Other birds that breed in Holsteinborg Nor include grey heron, common eider, European herring gull, common gull, black-headed gull, Arctic tern, mute swan, common coot and white-tailed eagle.

Basnæs Nor and Øksenæs Nor belong to the same bird sanctuary called Basnæs Nor Sanctuary (Danish: Basnæs Nor Vildtreservat). It is the oldest sanctuary in the country, being established in 1919. Birds that breed in the fjord include common eider, European herring gull, common gull, black-headed gull, Arctic tern and mute swan.

The land of Glænø are mainly cultivated, though also with beach meadows and a sizable forest of 60 acres. Glænø is under the Holsteinborg Nor sanctuary.

=== Agersø ===
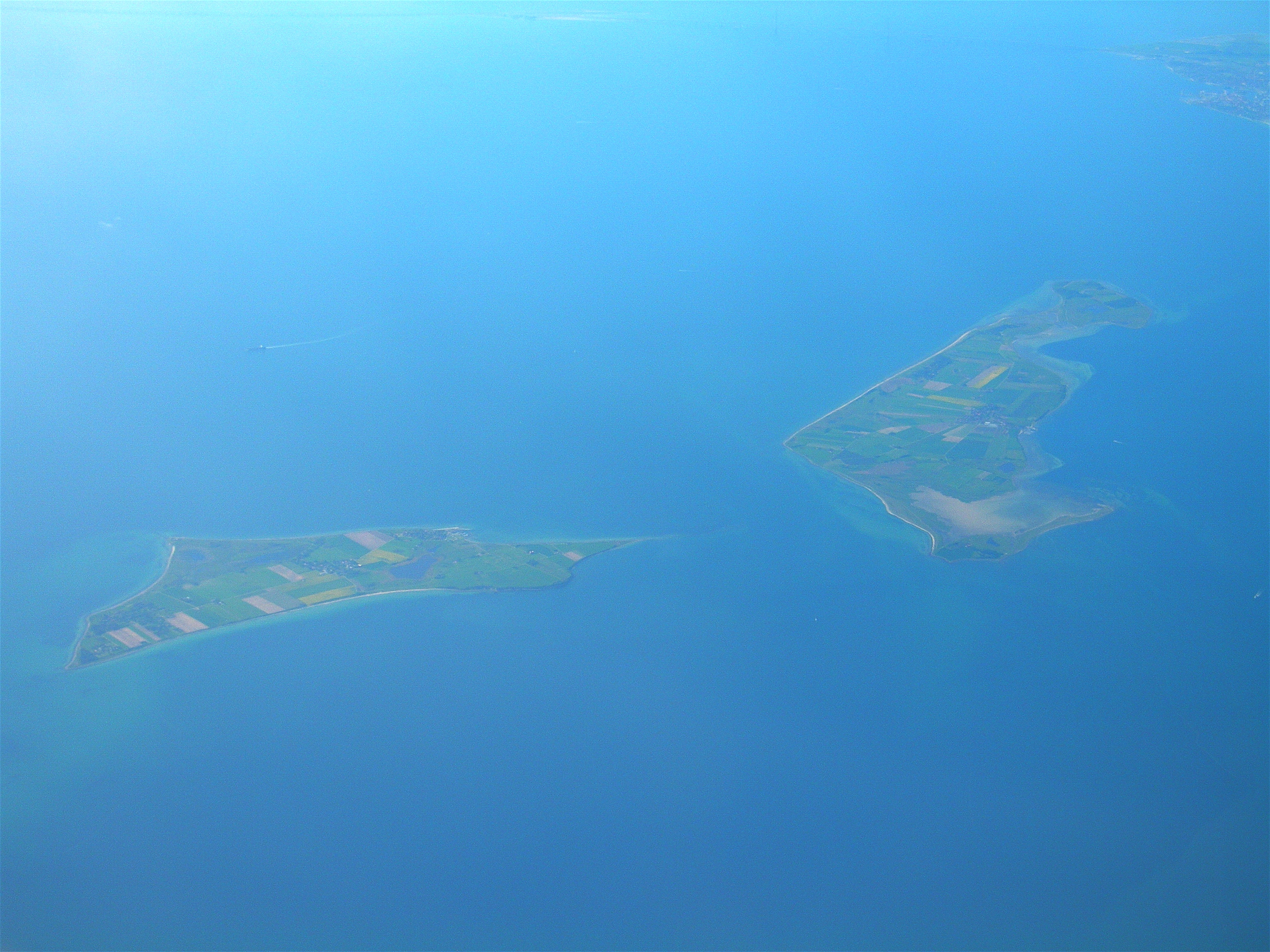
Agersø and Omø.

Agersø is located 3 km off the coast of Zealand, with ferry departures to Agersø By leaving from Stignæs Harbour. It is located between the Great Belt and Smålandsfarvandet. The island has a total area of 684, which includes former island of Egholm north of Agersø, which has now grown together with Agersø. Most of Agersø is cultivated, though there are sizable beach meadows on the southern parts of the island. Several amphibians rare in Denmark are found on Agersø. These include European fire-bellied toad, natterjack toad and European green toad. Breeding birds on the island include great black-backed gull, common gull, European herring gull, common eider, mallard, northern shoveler, northern pintail and gadwall.

=== Omø ===
Omø is located south of Agersø, 6 km off the coast of Zealand. The island has an area of 4.5 km^{2}. South of the village of Kirkehavn is a lake, Omø Lake (Danish: Omø Sø), and further west is a bog simply known as the Bog (Danish: Mosen), with the lake of Mosebækken. The greylag goose and Eurasian bittern breed in the area around Omø Lake.

=== Sprogø ===
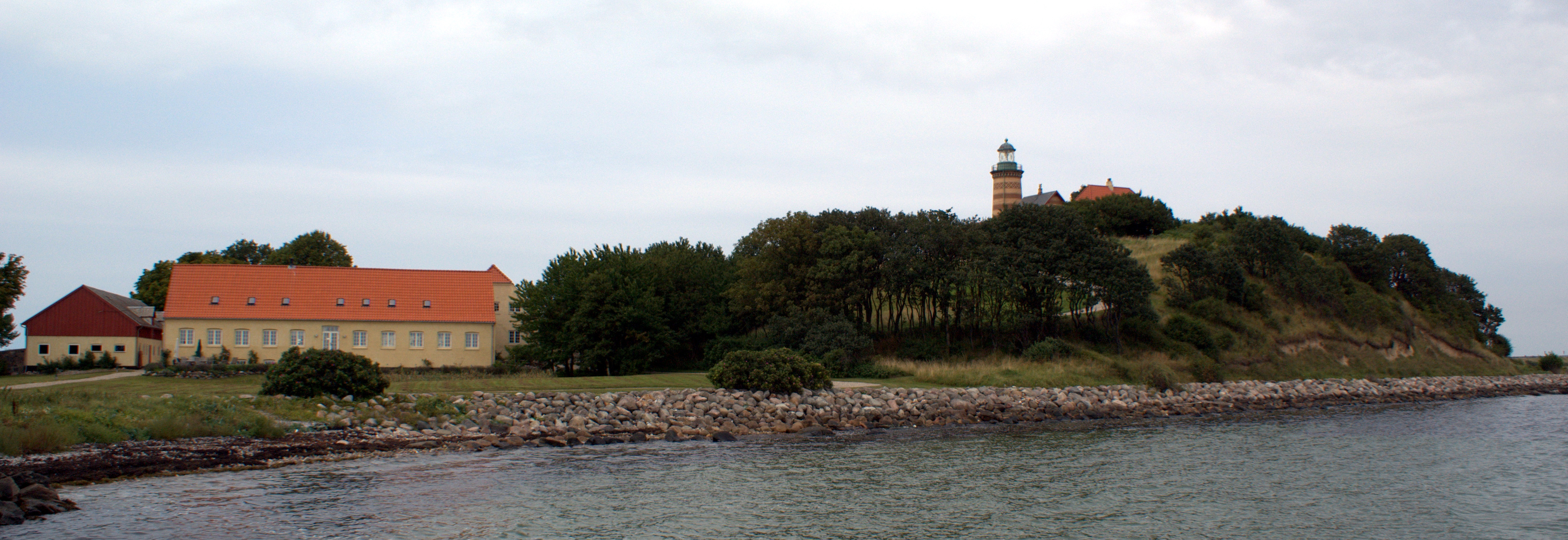
Sprogø.

Sprogø is 154 acres, and is located centrally in the Great Belt. It connects the two halves of the Great Belt Bridge, and the large amount of traffic caused by that limits the amount of wildlife found on the island. Despite that, the island is a popular breeding spot for many species of gulls and terns. The three Danish species of swallows thrive on the island, making home in the buildings and the lighthouse on the island. The sandwich tern, rare in Denmark, live on the island.

== Politics ==
In the Municipal Reform of 2007 the former Slagelse Municipality merged with the neighboring municipalities of Hashøj, Korsør and Skælskør to form the current Slagelse Municipality.

On the table below is an overview of all elections held in Denmark since the 2007 Municipal Reform. The percentages in the table are the local results from Slagelse Municipality. The party with the most votes received is shaded in their respective color. The Social Democrats and Venstre tend to be roughly the same size and the two largest parties in most elections. In the 2011 Folketing election the two parties were just 3 votes apart, with the Social Democrats receiving 12,645 votes and Venstre receiving 12,642 votes. On three occasions the largest party in the municipality was a different party. The Danish People's Party became the largest party in the 2009 and 2014 European Parliament elections and the 2015 Folketing election. In the 2014 European Parliament election it was the case in most of the country, and the first time in Denmark's history that the Danish People's Party had been the largest party in a nationwide election.

Election	Percentage															Turnout
Election	A	B	C	D	F	I	K	M	N	O	V	Æ	Ø	Å	...	Turnout
2007 Folketing	26.0	2.9	7.6	—	12.0	2.4	0.4	—	—	19.9	27.5	—	1.3	—	—	84.5%
2009 EP	21.1	2.7	11.6	—	14.4	0.5	—	—	6.1	21.5	19.8	—	—	—	2.3	56.1%
2009 Local	32.7	2.6	3.5	—	12.5	1.6	0.2	—	—	15.7	29.5	—	1.1	—	0.6	64.7%
2009 Region	28.2	3.4	5.0	—	13.5	0.5	0.3	—	—	15.0	30.4	—	1.7	—	1.9	64.5%
2011 Folketing	25.6	6.1	4.0	—	9.7	4.6	0.3	—	—	18.3	25.6	—	5.4	—	0.1	85.7%
2013 Local	34.7	2.3	2.4	—	2.3	5.5	0.2	—	—	14.5	29.2	—	5.9	—	3.1	71.1%
2013 Region	30.2	3.0	2.9	—	3.3	4.6	0.3	—	—	16.3	30.6	—	7.2	—	1.4	70.1%
2014 EP	18.8	4.0	7.0	—	8.2	2.6	—	—	8.4	34.4	16.5	—	—	—	—	52.5%
2015 Folketing	27.4	3.0	2.4	—	3.2	6.3	0.4	—	—	28.2	19.3	—	6.8	3.0	0.0	83.2%
2017 Local	34.6	2.8	2.2	2.5	6.0	2.7	0.2	—	—	13.6	29.1	—	4.1	1.4	0.7	69.6%
2017 Region	32.5	3.8	3.3	2.9	5.0	3.3	0.3	—	—	15.6	26.0	—	5.2	1.4	0.5	69.5%
2019 EP	24.0	6.9	4.8	—	11.0	2.0	—	—	4.6	15.8	23.5	—	5.2	2.3	—	60.0%
2019 Folketing	28.0	5.5	4.9	3.0	7.9	1.6	0.7	—	—	11.5	25.8	—	5.0	1.8	4.3	81.4%
2021 Local	27.9	4.8	8.9	7.0	6.3	1.0	0.3	—	—	5.4	33.6	—	4.1	—	0.8	63.7%
2021 Region	34.6	3.3	8.4	7.3	5.4	1.7	0.4	—	—	5.7	27.2	—	4.7	0.3	1.1	63.4%
2022 Folketing	31.9	1.8	3.8	4.9	8.0	6.3	0.2	9.9	—	3.9	14.8	9.2	2.9	1.4	0.2	79.7%
Data from Kmdvalg.dk

=== Municipal council ===
Slagelse's municipal council consists of 31 members, elected every four years.

Below are the municipal councils elected since the Municipal Reform of 2007.

Election	Party										Total seats	Turnout	Elected mayor
Election	A	B	C	D	F	I	O	V	Ø	...	Total seats	Turnout	Elected mayor
2005	13	1	1		2		3	10		1	31	67.4%	Lis Tribler (A)
2009	12		1		4		5	9			31	64.7%	Lis Tribler (A)
2013	12					2	5	10	2		31	71.1%	Stén Knuth (V)
2017	12	1			2	1	4	10	1		31	69.6%	John Dyrby Paulsen (A)
2021	9	2	3	2	2		1	11	1		31	63.7%	Knud Vincents (V)
Data from Kmdvalg.dk and Statistikbanken.dk

=== Mayors ===
Since the 2007 municipal reform, the mayors of Slagelse Municipality have been:

#	Mayor	Party	Term
1	Lis Tribler	Social Democrats	2007-2013
2	Stén Knuth	Venstre	2014-2017
3	John Dyrby Paulsen	Social Democrats	2018-2021
4	Knud Vincents	Venstre	2022-

== Economy ==
The largest industry in the private sector is retail and shops, employing around a quarter of the population hired in the private sector. Other large industries are services such as accounting, counseling, real estate and cleaning.

Companies with their headquarters in Slagelse Municipality include printing company Nilpeter. Harboe's Brewery is set in Skælskør. Harboe's Brewery is a brewery and factory that produce beer, soda and energi drinks. The company has been situated in Skælskør since it was founded in 1883.

Arla has a dairy factory in Slagelse. Orkla ASA has a factory in Skælskør.

== Demographics ==
Historical population
Year	Pop.	±%
2007	76,949	—
2010	77,475	+0.7%
2015	77,293	−0.2%
2016	78,140	+1.1%
2017	78,828	+0.9%
2018	78,968	+0.2%
2019	79,073	+0.1%
2020	79,073	+0.0%
2021	79,122	+0.1%
Source: Statistikbanken.dk

There are 79,073 people living in Slagelse Municipality (2020). 49.79% are men and 50.21 are women.

Below is the age distribution of the municipality.

Age
1. 0-5 (5.84%)
2. 6-17 (12.9%)
3. 18-35 (21.6%)
4. 36-64 (37.7%)
5. 64+ (21.9%)

== Education ==
There are 18 ground schools, 2 efterskoler and 8 independent schools in the municipality, as well as 1 youth school and 5 special schools. There are also 1 gymnasium, 1 vocational school and 1 music school.

There are three schools for higher education in the municipality: University College Absalon, Zealand Institute of Business and Technology and University of Southern Denmark.

There are 5 libraries in the municipality, with the main library set in Slagelse. The other libraries are located in Skælskør, Korsør, Agersø and Omø. There are also minor library services in Dalmose and Forlev-Vemmelev.

== Sights ==
With several larger towns in the municipality, the sights are spread out all across the municipality. The large number of villages also mean that there are many churches, and a number of manor houses are also found across the municipality.

- Arena Cirkusland is a circus, theme park and is the headquarter of Cirkus Arena. The theme park opened in 2006, and is open for the public during the school vacations. It is located by the village of Årslev, north of Slagelse.
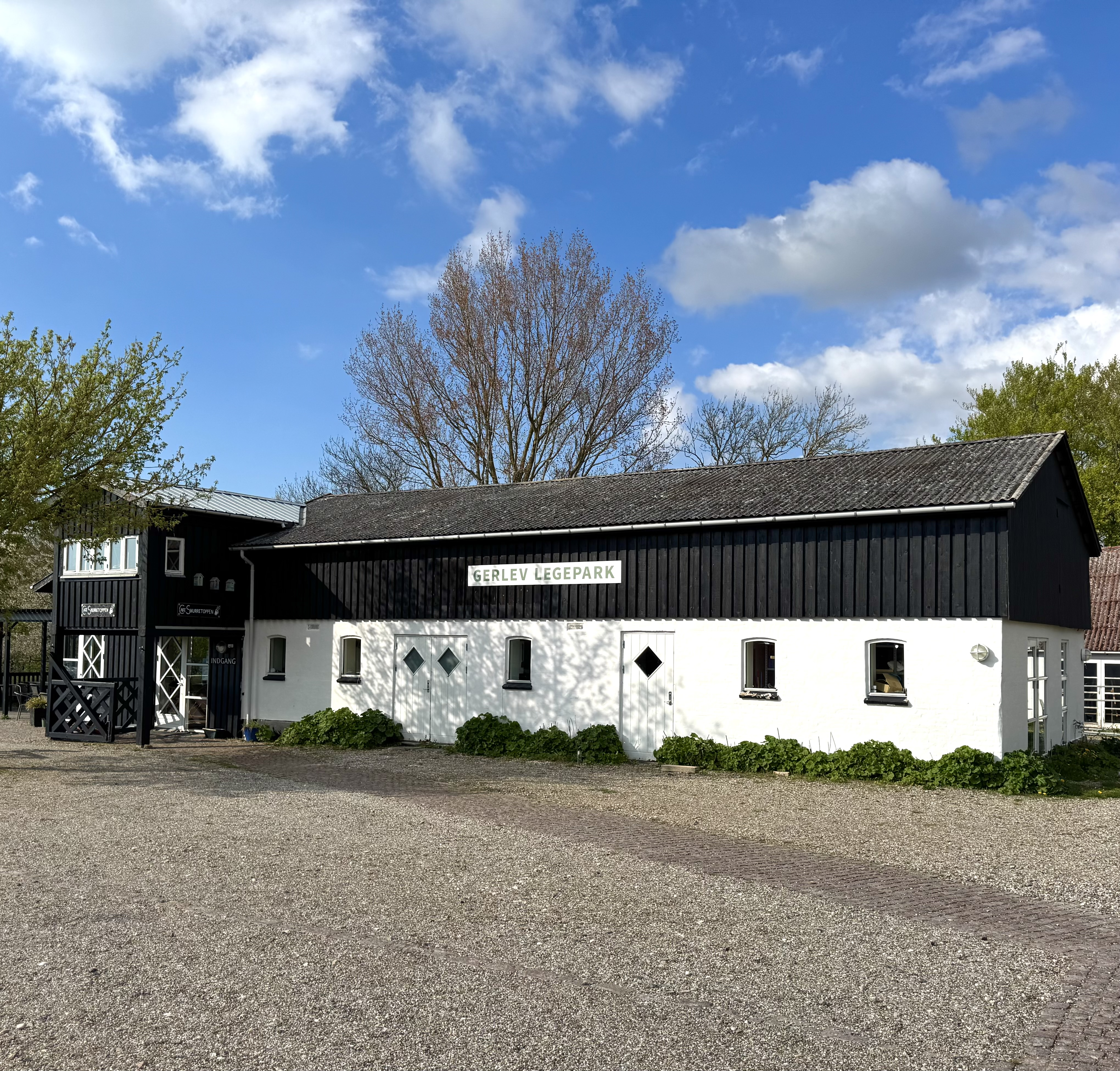
- Gerlev Play Park
  Gerlev Play Park (Danish: Gerlev Legepark) is a park and a science center in the field of playing. The park offers a variety of games and events. It is located by the village of Gerlev, south of Slagelse.
- Slagelse Park (Danish: Slagelse Lystanlæg) is a park located centrally in Slagelse. It is a green recreational area, with lakes, playgrounds and a maze.
- Korsør Fortification (Danish: Korsør Fæstning) is a set of fortifications located centrally in Korsør. It was built in the 1100s. Today there are five buildings on the fortifications, though all are built at different times and only the tower originates from the castle that used to be located on the fortification. The tower is from the 1200s.

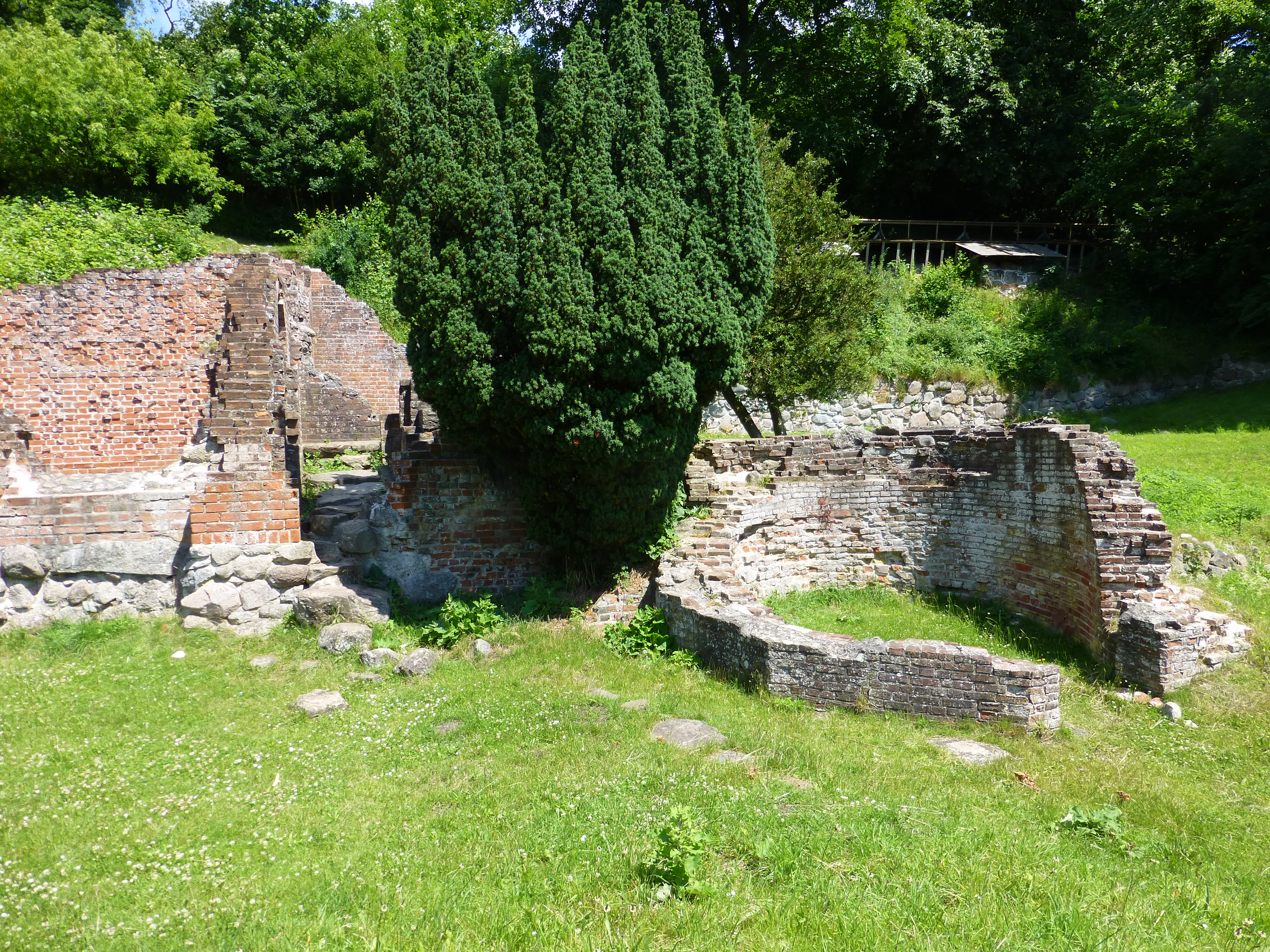
The ruins of Antvorskov Monastery.

- Guldagergaard is an international ceramic research center located in Skælskør. The center has an associated park.
- Kanehøj Post Mill (Danish: Kanehøj Mølle) is a post mill located outside Skælskør. It originates from 1881.
- Agersø Mill (Danish: Agersø Mølle) is a mill from 1892 located on Agersø.
- Korsør Mini Town (Danish: Korsør Miniby) is a miniature model of the town of Korsør as it looked in 1875. It is built in 1:10 scale and has existed since 2001.
- The Antvorskov Monastery Ruins are located in southern Slagelse. They are the ruins of Antvorskov Monastery, a monastery built in 1164 by Valdemar I. It was the first Knights Hospitaller monastery in Denmark, and was used as monastery until 1536 when the crown took over ownership and turned into a castle. Frederik II used the castle between 1580-1584. After that it was used by fief lords until 1717, when it became a ryttergods - a location for the Danish cavalry. It was sold in 1774 and most of the castle was torn down in 1816.

=== Museums ===
There are a number of museum in the municipality.

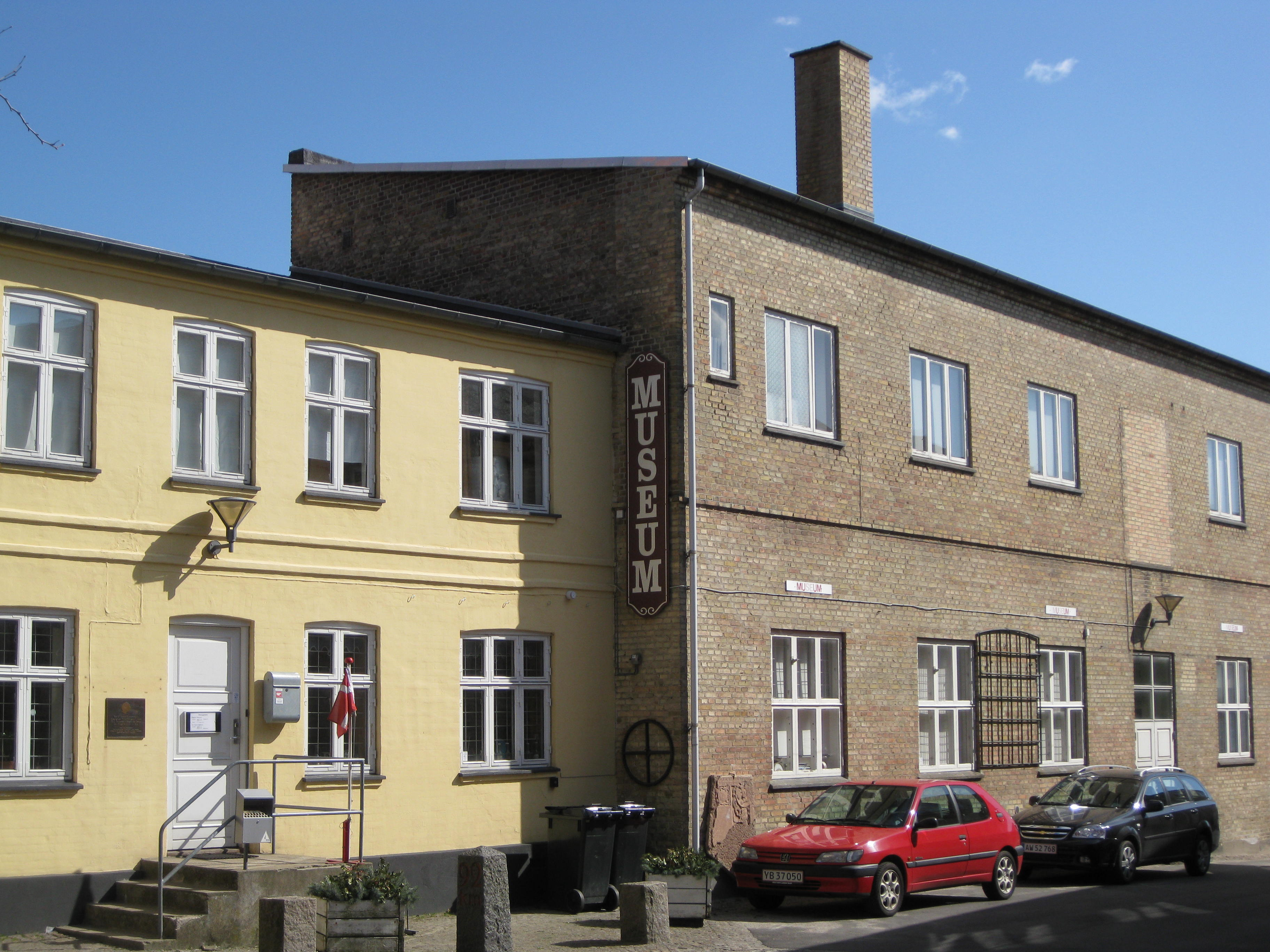
Slagelse Museum.

- Skovsgaard's Mill- and Bakery Museum (Danish: Skovsgaard Mølle- og Bagerimuseum) is a bakery museum located in the village of Fladholte, 12 km south-east of Slagelse. The museum covers the period between 1900–2000 and display a variety of bakery-related items. The museum also show a reconstruction of a bakery from 1880. The museum also include a modern bakery, where they sell bread.
- Korsør City and Strait Crossing Museum (Danish: Korsør By og Overfartsmuseum) is a museum located in Korsør. The museum was founded in 1983, and is focussed on the strait crossing from Korsør to Nyborg. The museum is located in a building on Korsør Fortification.
- Ice Boat Museum (Danish: Isbådsmuseet) is a museum about the iceboats used as transport across the Great Belt during winter. It is located west of Korsør, by the Great Belt Bridge.
- Slagelse Museum is located centrally in Slagelse. The museum focuses mainly on trade and artisanry. It includes a reconstruction of a shop from the 1940-1950s, as well as sections on local history. A part of the museum is dedicated to H. C. Andersen, who went to school in Slagelse.
- Flakkebjerg School Museum (Danish: Flakkebjerg Skolemuseum) is a museum located in Flakkebjerg. The museum focuses on schools in the period 1904–1962, and has existed since 1981.
- Skælskør Town Museum (Danish: Skælskør Bymuseum) is a local museum located in Skælskør. It focuses mostly on trade, maritime transport and fishery.
- Denmark's Bus Museum (Danish: Danmarks Busmuseum) is a museum about busses in Denmark. It is located in Skælskør.
- Danish Welfarehistorical Museum (Danish: Dansk Forsorgshistorisk Museum) is a museum in Slagelse about the history of welfare in terms of treatment of the mentally ill.
- Havrebjerg Museum is located in Havrebjerg. It focuses on the local history of the village.

==== Trelleborg ====
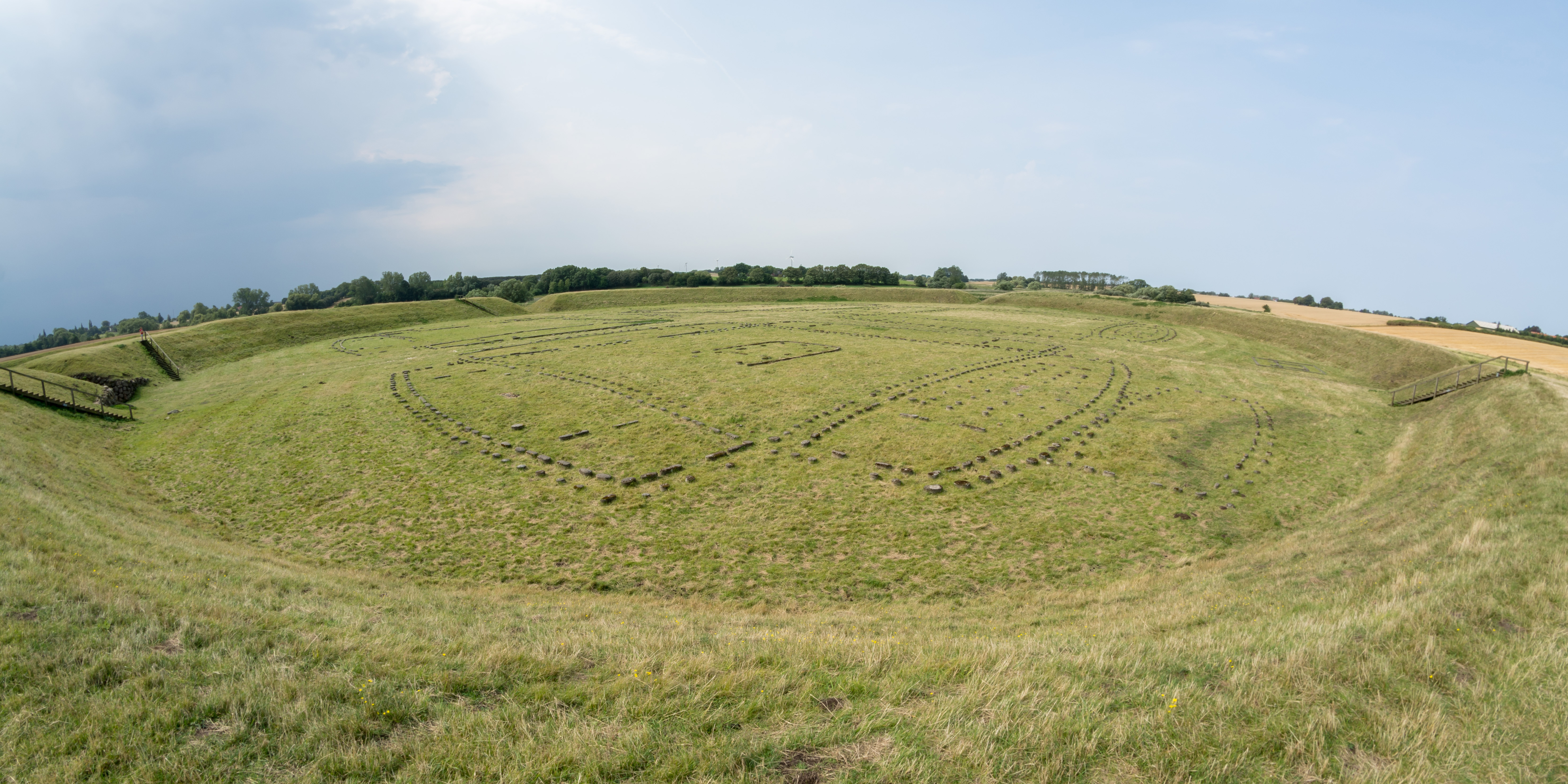
Trelleborg ring castle.

Trelleborg is a museum and ring castle located west of Slagelse, between the villages of Hejninge, Gammel Forlev and Næsby ved Stranden. The ring castle was built around year 980 by Harald Bluetooth. The museum exhibits items and discoveries from the ring castle, and educates about the Vikings and the Viking Age. The remnants of the ring castle are associated with the museum, and Viking battle reenactment occasionally take place around the ring castle. A yearly Viking-themed market takes place in Trelleborg's grounds, and also includes a large Viking battle reenactment.

Slagelse Municipality and the Danish National Museum are funding a project to rebuild part of the ring castle. The project is expected to be finished in 2022.

==== PanzerMuseum East ====
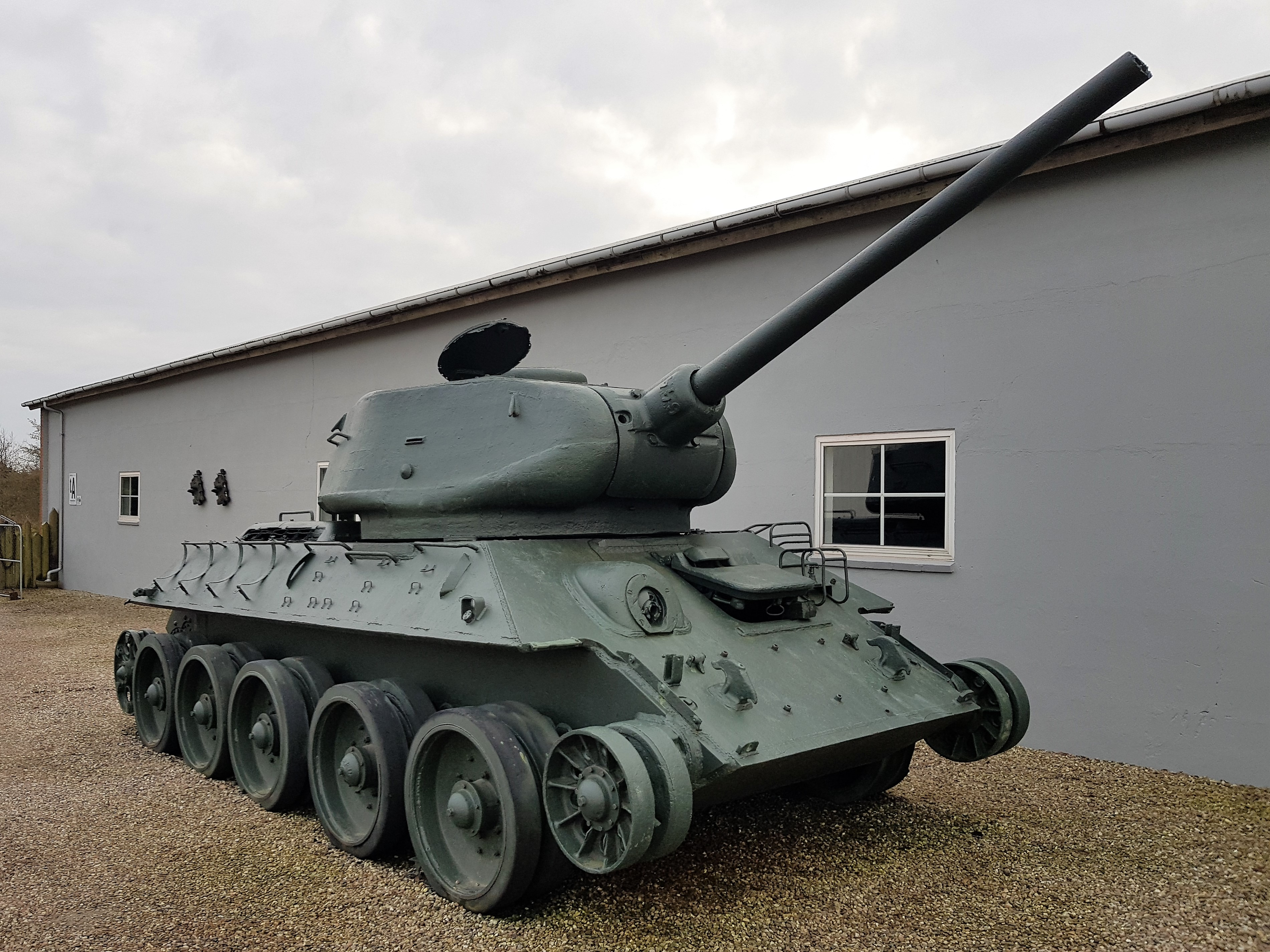
A T34/85 tank on display at PanzerMuseum East.

PanzerMuseum East is a museum for military vehicles located 12 km south-east of Slagelse in the small village of Fladholte. The museum holds the largest private collection of military vehicles in the Nordic Countries. The owner of the museum is Allan Pedersen, who opened the museum in 2014. Most of the vehicles and exhibited items in the museum have been restored by Pedersen, who opened the museum after having privately owned and restored the collection for years. The museum span 4,500 km^{2}, and include a large park area with 3 shelter groups. In the park are also nordmann fir available during Christmas for Christmas trees. The museum hosts a yearly market known as History and Lifestyle (Danish: Historie og Livsstil), which takes place in the park surrounding the museum.

The museum focuses primarily on military vehicles, though also display military uniforms and a variety of military memorabilia. Vehicles in the museum include T-72, BMP-1, OT-90, UAZ-469, ZIL-130, LuAZ-967 and more.

There are three aircraft in the museum, two helicopters and a passenger plane. The helicopters are a Mi-24P Hind helicopter and a Hip Mi-8 helicopter. The passenger plane is a Bac 1-11.

=== Castles and manors ===
The important central location of the municipality, in terms of agriculture and crossing of the Great Belt, has made it an ideal location for manor houses. Today there are still many manors scattered around the municipality.

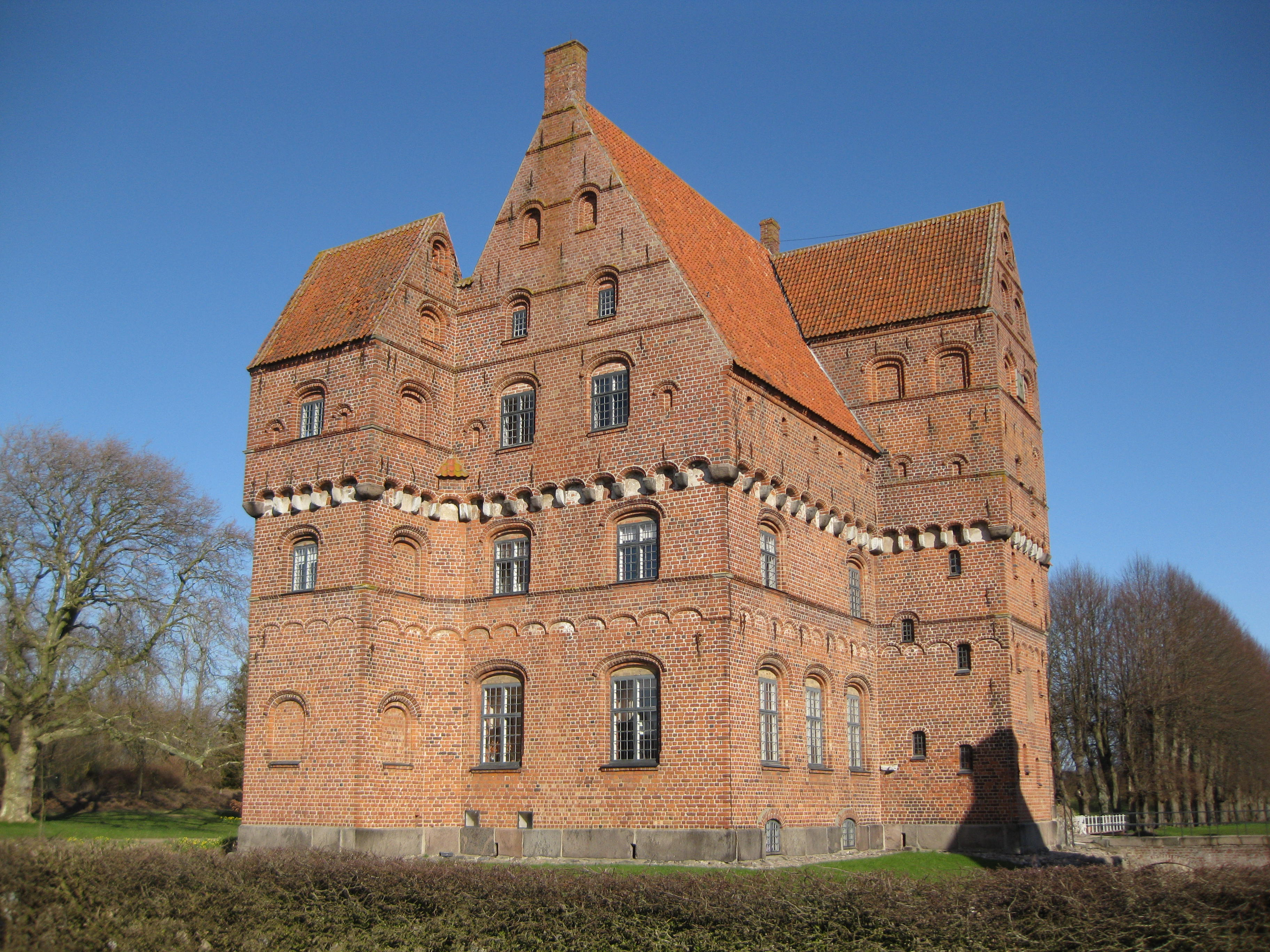
Borreby Castle.

- Basnæs is a manor located south of Skælskør. The manor used to be two villages, named Basnes and Nybølle. These were merged in the 1400s to form the Basnæs manor. The manor has switched owners frequently throughout its history.
- Bonderup is a manor located south-east of Korsør. It was built in the middle of the 1700s. Bonderup has been owned by the Moltke family since 1825.
- Borreby is a manor and castle located south of Skælskør. Like many manor houses in the area it used to be a village. The manor is known from at least 1344. It has since 1783 been owned by the Castenschiold family.
- Brorupgaard is a manor located south of Havrebjerg and north of Slagelse. The manor is first mentioned in 1454, but is known to have existed since the Middle Ages. Between 1740-1754 it was owned by Ludvig Holberg. It has since 1855 been owned by the Bech family.
- Charlottendal is a manor located south of Slagelse. It was a part of the Antvorskov Monastery, and later of the Antvorskov Cavalry District (Danish: Antvorskov Rytterdistrikt) until 1799 when Antvorskov was split up into several manors, one of them being Charlottendal. The manor is today part of Antvorskov barracks.
- Espe is a manor located south of Korsør and south-west of Boeslunde. The manor is known from at least 1561, and was owned by the crown before that. The manor has changed owners many times throughout history, but has since 1810 been owned by the Moltke family.
- Falkensteen is a manor located south of Slagelse. It is known to have existed since at least 1372 under the name of Pebringegaard. It was renamed to Falkensteen around the end of the 1700s, named after the manor's owner's wife, Anne Mathea Falck.
- Gerdrup is a manor located in the village of the same name. The earliest mentioning of Gerdrup comes from 1417, though it is likely much older than that. It has been owned by the Fabricius family since 1919.
- Gyldenholm is a manor located south-east of Slagelse. It is a young manor, established in 1774.
- Idagaard is a manor located in Slagelse. It was a part of Antvorskov Cavalry District (Danish: Antvorskov Rytterdistrikt) until 1799 when Antvorskov was split up into several manors, one of them being Idagaard.
- Lyngbygaard is a manor located between Boeslunde and Eggeslevmagle. Lyngbygaard was originally a village named Lyngby, though it was burned down during the Dano-Swedish War in 1657-1658. The manor was established in 1700, and has been a part of the Gerdrup manor through most of its history, and still is today.

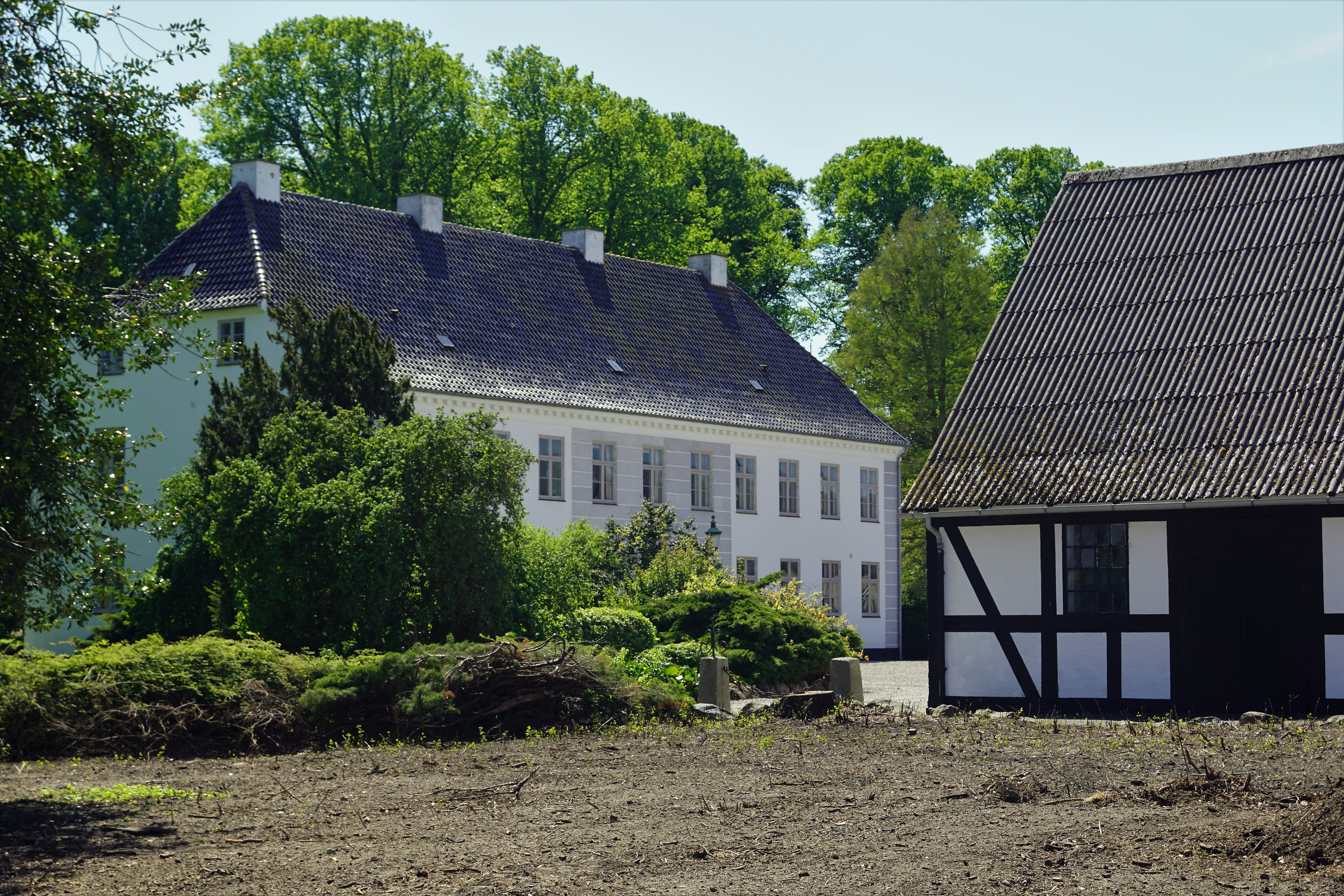
Taarnholm Manor.

- Snedinge is a manor located north of Glænø, between Skælskør and Bisserup. It has existed since 1370 and has been a part of the Holsteinborg manor since 1708.
- Store Frederikslund is a manor located north-east of Slagelse and north-west of Sorø. It was established in 1783. In 2012 the manor was sold for 200 million DKK, which made it one of the largest real estate trades in Denmark's history.
- Taarnborg is a manor located in Halsskov in Korsør. Taarnborg was originally a village, in which a castle was built in the 1100s. It was referred to as Korsør Castle and later came under the name of Dyrehovedgaard. It was renamed to Taarnborg in 1846. The manor owns 334 acres.
- Taarnholm is a manor located east of Korsør, across Korsør Nor. It is located between the villages of Hulby, Ormeslev and Halseby. It was established in 1774, before that being a part of the Antvorskov Cavalry District (Danish: Antvorskov Rytterdistrikt). With the district dissolved, the territory was auctioned off, and was bought by Christian Eggers who established the Taarnholm manor. The two churches of Hemmeshøj and Taarnborg were also part of the manor, though barely any of the land was cultivated or built up, having been used for grazing horses. Christian Eggers' son inherited the manor, and in 1796 he sold Taarnholm to the owner of the Nordruplund manor. It was sold again in 1805, this time to a consortium. The consortium dissolved in 1819, where Vilhelm Carl Ferdinand Ahlefeldt-Laurvigen became the sole owner of the manor. It was sold off to the National Bank in 1835, but was sold off again already in 1836. The manor is today used for agriculture and own 465 acres.
- Valbygaard is a manor located north-west of Slagelse. It is known to have existed since the Middle Ages, and was until 1774 owned by the crown. It has been in the Bech family since 1846.

==== Holsteinborg ====
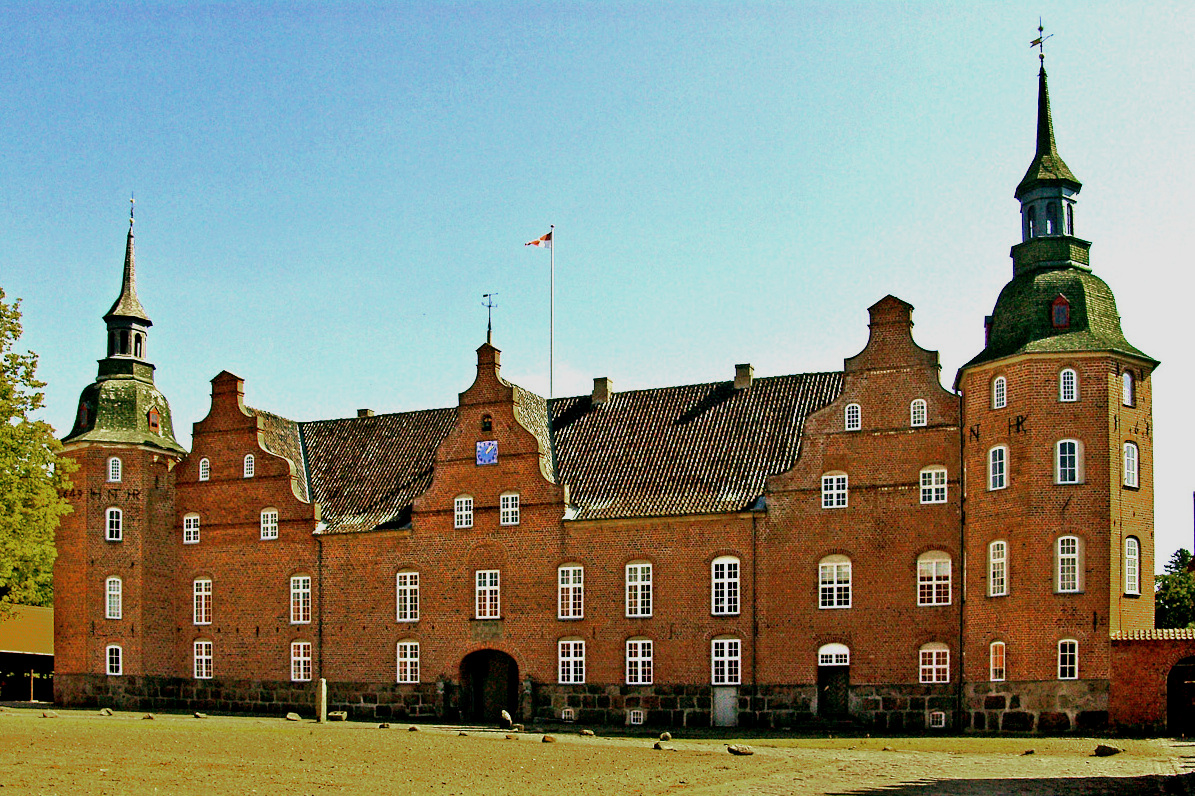
Holsteinborg Castle.

Holsteinborg is a manor and castle located south of Rude, north-west of Bisserup and north-east of Glænø. Holsteinborg has existed since at least the early 1300s, though a castle has likely been located at Holsteinborg's location since the 1100s, where it would have been a defensive castle. In the 1300s Holsteinborg was named Braade. It was owned by the church until 1536 where it was taken by the crown. In 1562 it was sold off to Niels Trolle, brother of Herluf Trolle. Niels Trolle died in 1565 in the Seven Years' War, and Braade was inherited by his widow and children. One of his children, Børge Trolle, bought out the other heirs and renamed the manor to Trolholm. It remained under the Trolle family until 1707, where it was sold to Ulrich Adolph Holstein, who renamed the manor to Holsteinborg. He also owned the manors of Snedinge and Fyrendal. Both of these came under Holsteinborg in 1708. It has since then remained under ownership of the Holstein-Holsteinborg family.

The total area of Holsteinborg's land amount to 1,386 acres. Of these are 800 used for agriculture and 546 for forests.

=== Churches ===
See List of churches in Slagelse Municipality

=== Events ===
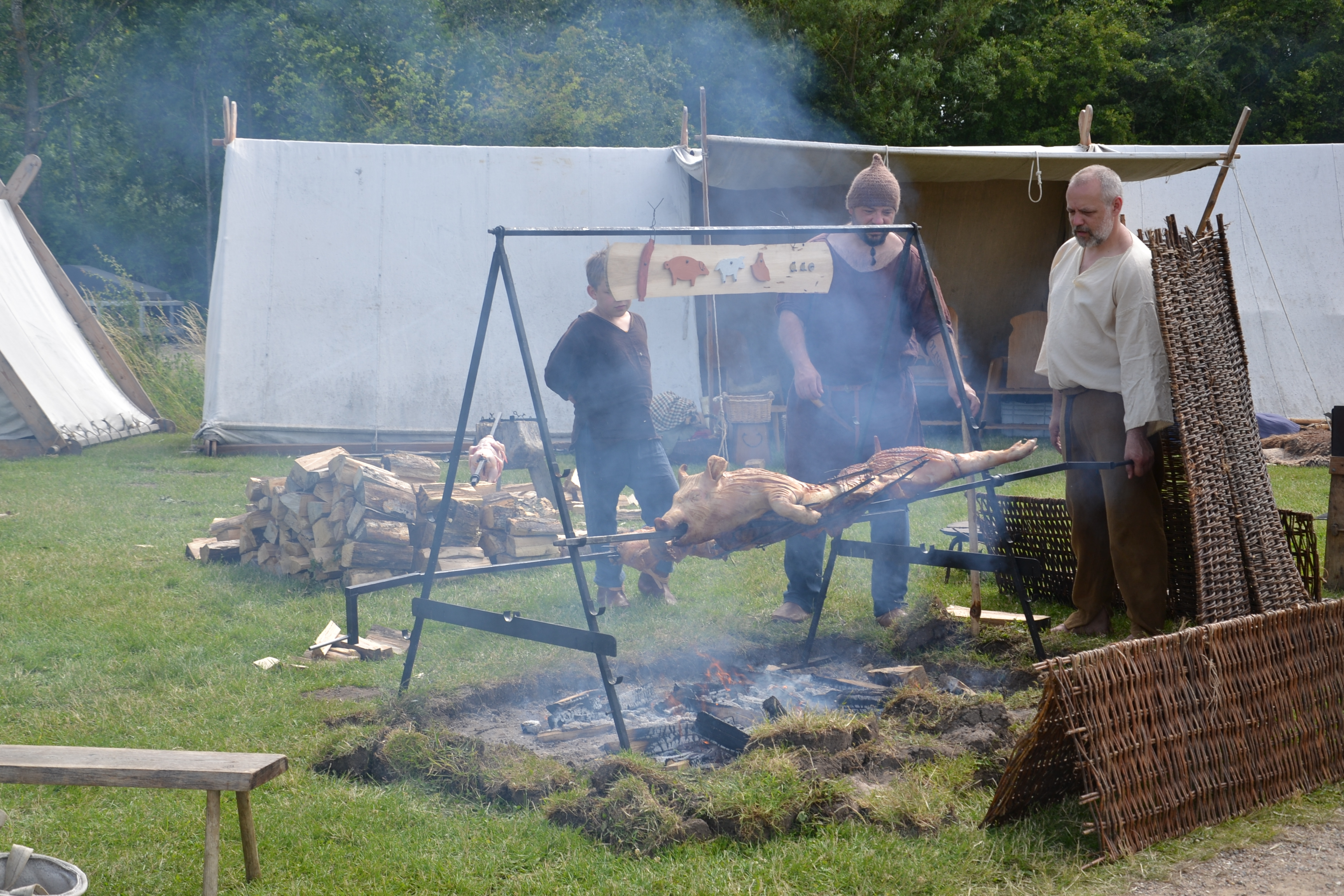
Pig roast at the Viking Festival at Trelleborg.

Slagelse Celebration Week (Danish: Slagelse Festuge) is a yearly week-long event, which takes place in Slagelse. Through the week there are live music and entertainment, as well as a running race through the city.

Sørby Market (Danish: Sørby Marked) is a yearly kræmmermarked - a type of flea market. It takes place in Sørbymagle. Along with the various booths through the market, there are also live music, food and entertainment.

Skælskør Ceramics Festival (Danish: Skælskør Keramikfestival) is a yearly arrangement focused around ceramics. The arrangement includes a market and many displays of ceramics by various artists.

A yearly Viking-themed market takes place on Trelleborg's grounds, and also includes a large Viking battle reenactment, as well as various types of entertainment and education.

PanzerMuseum East hosts a yearly market known as History and Lifestyle (Danish: Historie og Livsstil), which takes place in the park surrounding the museum. It's a market with focus on lifestyle, with history-focussed entertainment and education.

== Parishes ==
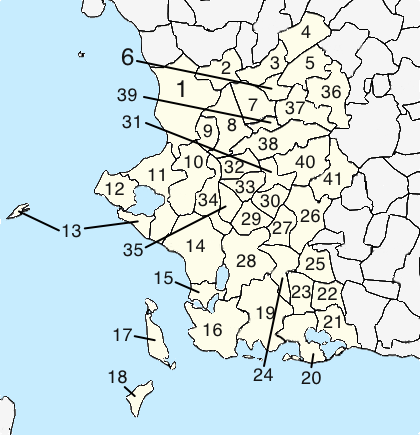
Parishes of Slagelse Municipality.

There are 41 parishes in Slagelse Municipality. Shown in the table below are the populations of each parish, as well as the percentage of that population that are members of the Church of Denmark. All numbers are from 1 January 2020.

#	Parish	Population	%	Source
1	Kirke Stillinge	2,488	88.42	
2	Havrebjerg	582	85.22	
3	Sønderup	436	82.80	
4	Nordrupvester	323	87.93	
5	Sorterup	348	79.89	
6	Gudum	98	83.67	
7	Nørrevang	8,029	64.27	
8	Sankt Peders	10,101	81.81	
9	Hejninge	161	89.44	
10	Vemmelev	2,938	89.96	
11	Tårnborg	2,719	86.83	
12	Halskov	7,188	70.74	
13	Sankt Povls	7,470	81.51	
14	Boeslunde	1,404	85.68	
15	Skælskør	3,913	79.02	
16	Magleby	513	84.02	
17	Agersø	186	89.78	
18	Omø	166	82.53	
19	Tjæreby	716	86.59	
20	Ørslev	236	82.63	
21	Holsteinborg	889	79.75	
22	Venslev	182	84.07	
23	Sønder Bjerge	347	79.25	
24	Høve	306	85.95	
25	Hyllested	343	85.42	
26	Gimlinge	1,413	87.69	
27	Flakkebjerg	729	84.22	
28	Eggeslevmagle	3,111	81.55	
29	Fårdrup	276	82.97	
30	Skørpinge	242	84.30	
31	Sludstrup	303	84.49	
32	Slots Bjergby	1,038	90.56	
33	Gerlev	241	79.25	
34	Hemmeshøj	422	87.68	
35	Lundforlund	177	91.53	
36	Kindertofte	173	72.83	
37	Ottestrup	926	77.43	
38	Antvorskov	5,899	74.66	
39	Sankt Mikkels	9,976	71.00	
40	Sørbymagle	1,551	87.36	
41	Kirkerup	309	86.04	

== Symbols ==
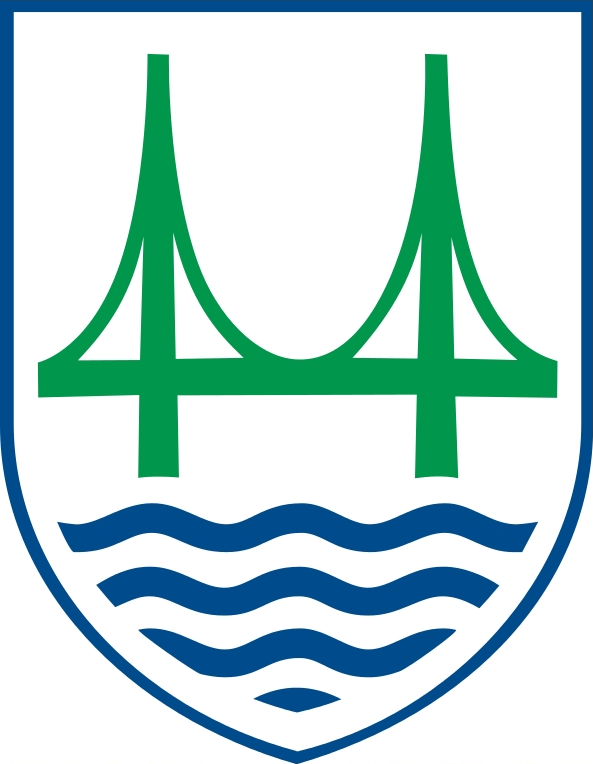
Coat of Arms of Slagelse Municipality.

The coat of arms of Slagelse Municipality shows the Great Belt Bridge in green on white background, with blue wavy lines under the bridge to represent the Great Belt. The bridge represents cooperation and balance with the surrounding nature. It also shows the municipality as a forward-looking municipality with high ambitions, with people and technological progress in focus. It is also meant to be a clearly distinguishable feature. It was adopted in 2009. The coat of arms doesn't resemble any previous coat of arms from the area and is a unique design from 2009.

Below are all coats of arms of the cities of the municipality.

Slagelse

Korsør

Skælskør

== Notable residents ==
=== Public thought ===
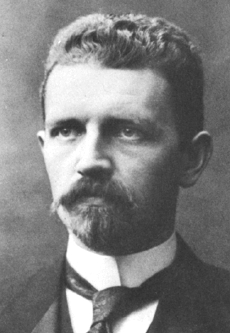
Niels Erik Nørlund

- Hedevig Johanne Bagger (1740 in Korsør – 1822), inn-keeper and postmaster
- Ludvig Stoud Platou (1778 in Slagelse – 1833), historical and geographical writer
- Georg Koës (1782 on Antvorskov – 1811), philologist
- William Christopher Zeise (1789 in Slagelse – 1847), chemist
- Jørgen Peter Frederik Wulff (1808 in Slagelse – 1881), naval officer
- Johannes Helms (1828 in Sørbymagle – 1895), writer and schoolmaster
- Haldor Topsøe (1842 in Skælskør – 1935), chemist
- Vilhelm Andersen (1864 in Nordrup – 1953), author, literary historian and intellectual
- Søren Peter Lauritz Sørensen (1868 in Havrebjerg – 1939), chemist and inventor of the pH-scale.
- Aage Friis (1870 in Korsør – 1949), historian
- Hans A. Hansen (1877 in Korsør – 1949), sailor for the United States Navy
- Niels Erik Nørlund (1885 in Slagelse – 1981), mathematician
- Margrethe Nørlund Bohr (1890 in Slagelse – 1984), editor and transcriber for Danish physicist Niels Bohr
- Hedda Lundh (1921 in Korsør – 2012), resistance fighter during the German occupation of Denmark in World War II
- Bertel Bruun (1937 in Skælskør – 2011), conservationist
- Morten Storm (born 1976 in Korsør), former PET agent

=== Politics ===
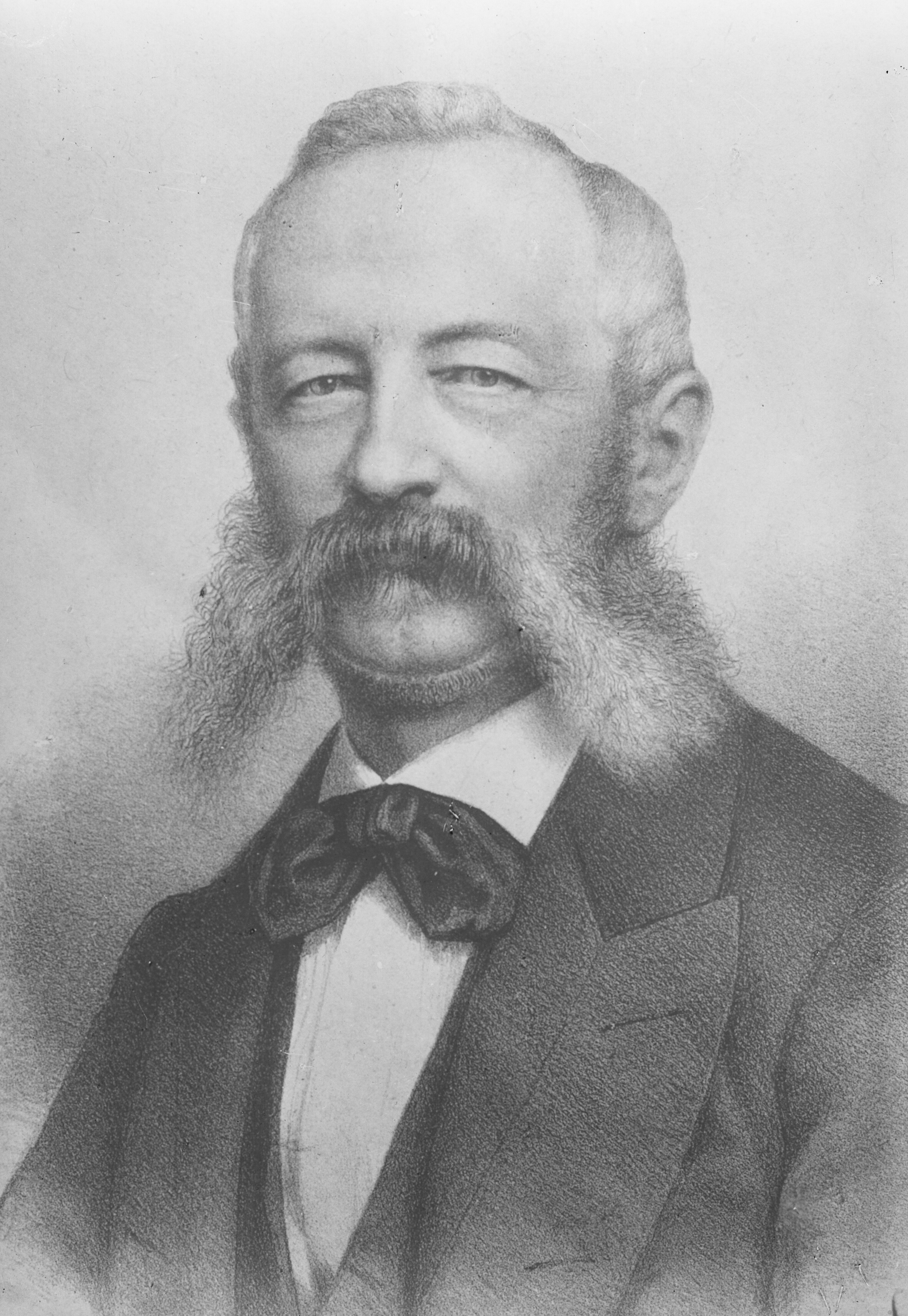
Ludvig Holstein-Holsteinborg

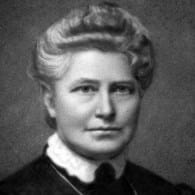
Anna Laursen

- Ludvig Holstein-Holsteinborg (1815 in Holsteinborg Castle – 1892), politician, landowner and noble
- Anna Laursen (1845 in Slagelse – 1911), schoolteacher and women's rights activist
- Hilmar Baunsgaard (1920 in Slagelse – 1989), politician and leader of the Danish Social Liberal Party from 1968–1975
- Lis Tribler (born 1952 in Korsør), politician and former mayor
- Villum Christensen (born 1954 in Slagelse), politician and MF
- Kim Christiansen (born 1956 in Slagelse), politician and MF
- John Dyrby Paulsen (born 1963 in Korsør), politician and mayor of the municipality
- Pia Adelsteen (born 1963 in Korsør), politician and MF
- Henrik Brodersen (born 1964 in Skælskør), politician and MF
- Stén Knuth (born 1964 in Slagelse), politician and MF
- Pernille Rosenkrantz-Theil (born 1977 in Skælskør), politician and MF
- Louise Schack Elholm (born 1977 in Slagelse), politician and MF
- Rasmus Horn Langhoff (born 1980 in Slagelse), politician and MF

=== Artisanry and construction ===
- Andreas Bjørn (1703 i Skælskør – 1750), merchant and shipbuilder
- Conrad Christian Hornung (1801 in Skælskør – 1873), piano maker
- Ludvig Fenger (1833 in Slots Bjergby – 1905), architect and proponent of the Historicist style
- Nels Johnson (1838 in Nordrup – 1915), clockmaker in Michigan, the manufacturer of Century tower clocks
- Vilhelm Lauritzen (1894 in Slagelse – 1984), architect and founder of the Vilhelm Lauritzen Architects architectural firm

=== Art ===
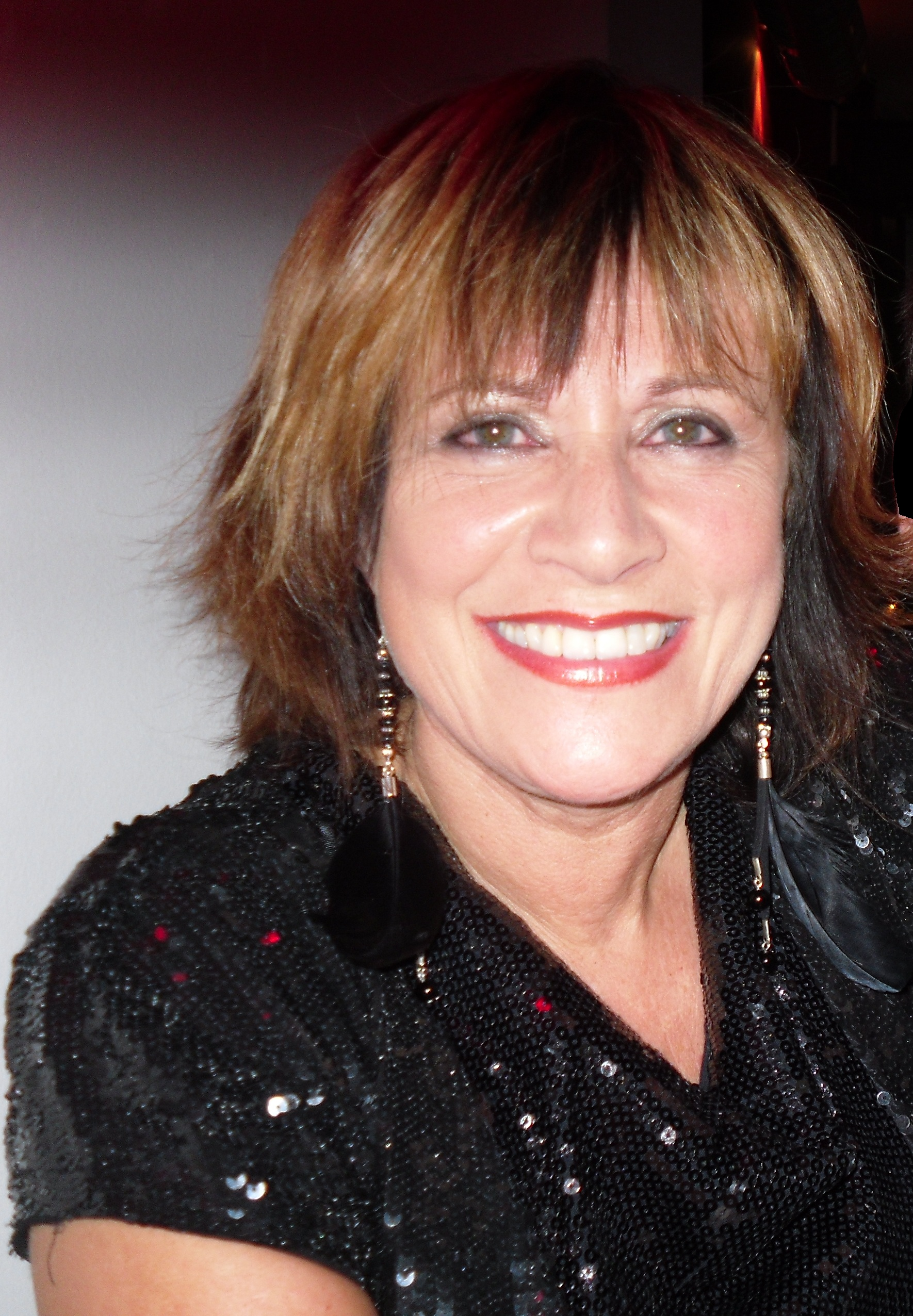
Kirsten Siggaard

- Johan Jacob Bruun (1715 in Slagelse – 1789), painter
- Jens Baggesen (1764 in Korsør – 1826), poet
- Andrea Krætzmer (1811 in Slagelse – 1889), ballet dancer
- Didrik Frisch (1835 in Slagelse – 1867), landscape painter
- Ludvig Abelin Schou (1838 in Slagelse – 1867), painter
- Vilhelm Topsøe (1840 in Skælskør – 1881), author
- Aage Giødesen (1863 in Korsør – 1939), painter
- Urban Gad (1879 in Korsør – 1947), film director
- Hans Egede Budtz (1889 in Slagelse – 1968), actor
- Hardy Rafn (1930 in Slagelse – 1997), actor
- Stig Brøgger (born 1941 in Slagelse), artist
- Torben Lendager (born 1951 in Slagelse), singer
- Kirsten Siggard (born 1954 in Slagelse), singer and 3-time participant of the Eurovision Song Contest
- Karsten Kiilerich (born 1955 in Slagelse), director, writer and animator
- Elle Klarskov Jørgensen (born 1958 in Slagelse), sculptor
- Pia Juul (born 1962 in Korsør), poet and translator
- Sannie Charlotte Carlson (born 1970 in Skælskør), singer
- Christian "Klumben" Andersen (born 1987 in Vemmelev), musician
- Simone Egeriis (born 1992 in Slagelse), pop singer
- Alex Høgh Andersen (born 1994 in Slagelse), actor

=== Sport ===
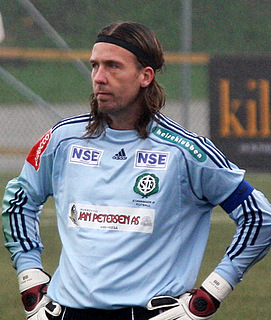
Bo Braastrup Andersen

- Fred K. Nielsen (1879 in Slagelse – 1963), college football coach
- Hans Olsen (fencer) (1886 in Slagelse – 1976), fencer
- Poul Toft Jensen (1912 in Slagelse – 2000), football player
- Gunner Olesen (1916 in Slagelse – 1979), gymnast
- Villy Moll Nielsen (1927 in Slagelse), field hockey player
- Poul Moll Nielsen (1930 in Slagelse – 1992), field hockey player
- Torben Alstrup Jensen (1930 in Slagelse – 2007), field hockey player
- Willy Kristoffersen (born 1933 in Slagelse), field hockey player
- Ernst Pedersen (born 1935 in Slagelse), former sports shooter
- Vagn Bangsborg (born 1936 in Slagelse), former cyclist
- Ole Ritter (born 1941 in Slagelse), former cyclist
- Brian Nielsen (born 1965 in Korsør), former boxer
- Karsten Nielsen (born 1973 in Skælskør), rower
- Bo Braastrup Andersen (born 1976 in Slagelse), football manager and former goalkeeper
- Martin Kristjansen (born 1977 in Slagelse), boxer
- Joachim Persson (born 1983 in Slagelse), badminton player
- Casper Henningsen (born 1985 in Korsør), former football player
- Jim Larsen (born 1985 in Korsør), former football player
- Buster Juul (born 1993 in Slagelse), handball player
- Niklas Larsen (born 1997 in Slagelse), cyclist
