= Sørbymagle =

- Town
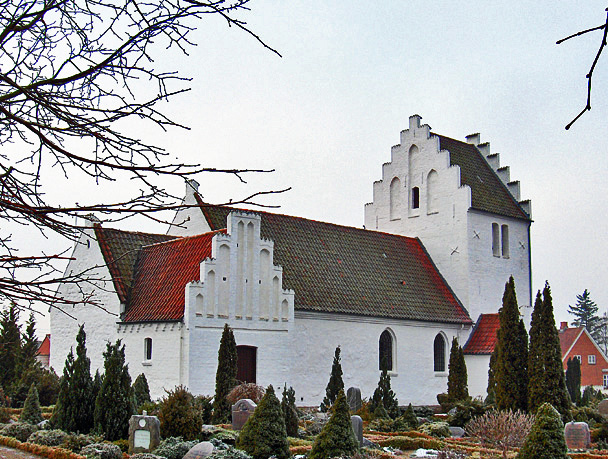
- Sørbymagle Church

- Location in Region Zealand Sørbymagle (Denmark)
- Coordinates: 55°21′36″N 11°26′31″E
- Country: Denmark
- Region: Region Zealand
- Municipality: Slagelse

Area
  - Urban: 0.82 km^{2} (0.32 sq mi)

Population (2026)
  - Urban: 1,112
  - Urban density: 1,400/km^{2} (3,500/sq mi)
- Time zone: UTC+1 (CET)
  - Summer (DST): UTC+2 (CEST)
- Postal code: DK-4200 Slagelse

Sørbymagle is a town on Zealand, Denmark. It is located in Slagelse Municipality. The town is located 6 km south-east of Slagelse and 9 km north-west of Fuglebjerg. The town is the main town within the church districht (Danish: sogn) of Søbymagle Sogn and lies 3 km west of the village Kirkerup.

== Sørbymagle Church ==
Sørbymagle Church was built around year 1150. The oldest parts of the church are the choir and nave. A sacristy, church porch and tower are added in the 1400s. The altarpiece is an oil painting depicting Jesus and Peter the Apostle. It was painted by P. Møller in 1898. The church's chalice is from 1647. The pulpit is from 1630. There are two bells in the church. One is from 1834, made in Copenhagen. The other also comes from Copenhagen, and was made in 1897.
