= Rude (Slagelse Municipality) =

- Village
- Location in Region Zealand
- Coordinates: 55°14′0″N 11°28′3″E
- Country: Denmark
- Region: Region Zealand
- Municipality: Slagelse

Population (2026)
  - Total: 304
- Time zone: UTC+1 (CET)
  - Summer (DST): UTC+2 (CEST)

Rude is a village on Zealand, Denmark. It is located in Slagelse Municipality.
