= Kirke Stillinge =

- Village
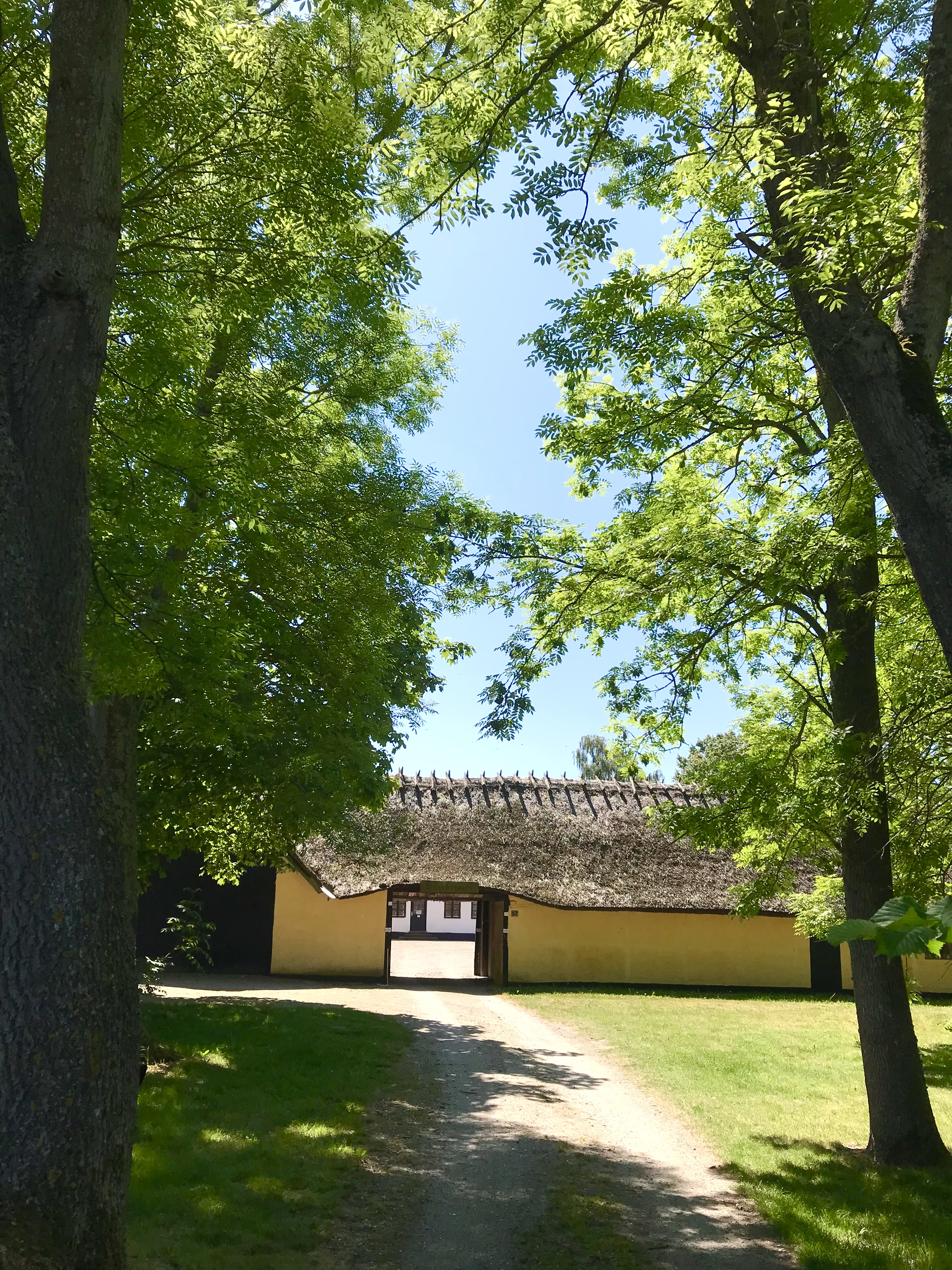
- Farm by the village pond in Kirke Stillinge

- Location in Region Zealand
- Coordinates: 55°26′11″N 11°14′41″E
- Country: Denmark
- Region: Region Zealand
- Municipality: Slagelse

Population (2026)
  - Total: 743
- Time zone: UTC+1 (CET)
  - Summer (DST): UTC+2 (CEST)

Kirke Stillinge is a village on Zealand, Denmark. It is located in Slagelse Municipality.

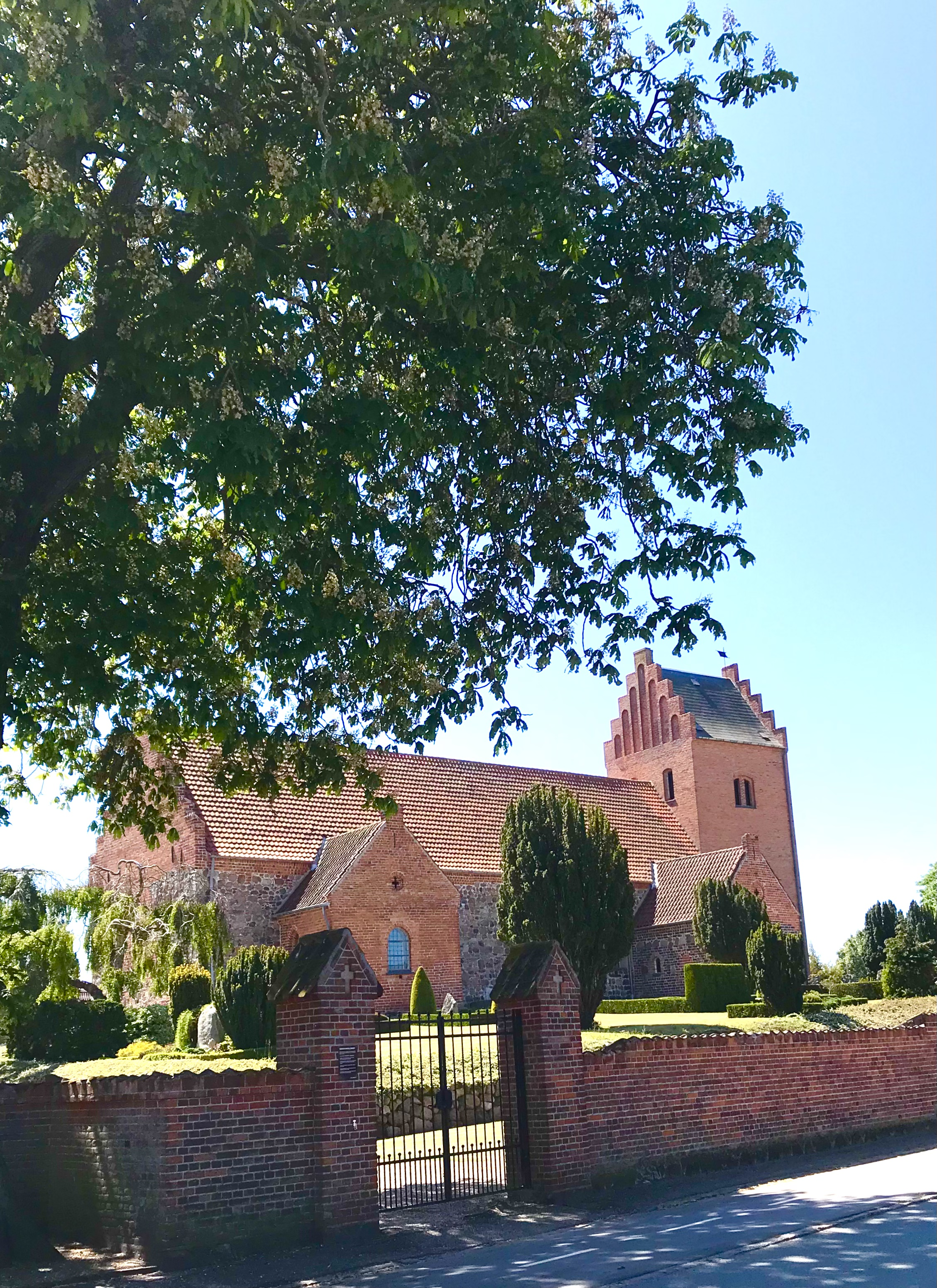
Stillinge Church

== Stillinge Church ==
Stillinge Church, also referred to as Kirke Stillinge Church, is the only national church in Kirke Stillinge Parish. The church consists of a nave with several extensions, including a choir, sacristy, chapel, tower and two church porches. There likely were another choir before the current one, which was built around year 1400. The sacristy is also built around this time. The church underwent a restoration in 2009. The altarpiece is from 1602, though it includes parts of an earlier altarpiece from 1480. The church's wafer box is from 1860. The baptismal font is in oak and is from 1902. The pulpit is from around 1600. There are two bells in the church. One is from 1525, and the other is from 1923 made in Copenhagen. The organ is from 1974.
