= 2005 in Denmark =

- Decades: 1980s; 1990s; 2000s; 2010s; 2020s
- See also: Other events of 2005; List of years in Denmark

Events from the year 2005 in Denmark.

== Incumbents ==
- Monarch - Margrethe II
- Prime minister – Anders Fogh Rasmussen

== Events ==
=== January ===
- 1 January – New Year's celebrations all over Denmark fall silent for two minutes as mark of respect for Scandinavian memorial service for those affected by the 2004 Indian Ocean tsunami.
- 8 January – Denmark is hit by the storm called Erwin, the most powerful storm since the 1999 storm called Anatol. Some areas are flooded as the wind causes very high seawater levels, but overall the damage is limited.
- 15 January – The new Copenhagen Opera House is inaugurated.
- 18 January – Prime Minister Anders Fogh Rasmussen calls for parliamentary elections, scheduled for 8 February.

=== February ===
- 8 February – 2005 Danish parliamentary election: The coalition of the Liberal Party and the Conservative People's Party is reelected. The Danish Social Liberal Party almost doubles their seats from 9 to 17, while the Liberal Party loses 4 and the Social Democrats loses 5. Following their failure to gain enough votes, Mogens Lykketoft steps down as leader of the Social Democrats, Holger K. Nielsen steps down as leader of the Socialist People's Party, and Mimi Jakobsen steps down as leader of the Centre Democrats. The Centre Democrats and the Christian Democrats fail to get above the 2-percent limit, the Centre Democrats for the second time in a row.
- 18 February – Prime Minister Anders Fogh Rasmussen presents his updated cabinet.

=== March ===
- 3 March – At 19.17 the 3500-ton freighter, MV Karen Danielsen, crashes into the Western bridge of the Great Belt Bridge, 800m from Funen. All traffic across the bridge is closed, effectively splitting Denmark in two.
- 4 March
  - – The Great Belt Bridge is reopened shortly after midnight after the freighter MV Karen Danielsen was pulled free, and inspectors found no structural damage to the bridge.
  - – The coldest day so far in Denmark this year. -20.2 degrees Celsius measured at Tune Airport near Roskilde. This is also the coldest day in the month of March since 1987. Source DMI.

=== April ===
- 12 April – The Social Democrats elect a new leader to replace Mogens Lykketoft who resigned after losing the 2005 Danish parliamentary election. Helle Thorning-Schmidt is elected ahead of Frank Jensen with 24,261 votes (53%) against 21,348 votes (47%).
- 28 April – Villy Søvndal is elected as the new leader of the Socialist People's Party.

=== June ===
- 8 June – An arson attack destroys Minister for Refugees, Immigrants and Integration Rikke Hvilshøj's car and part of her house.

=== July ===
- 7 July – Security in Denmark is stepped up after the 7 July 2005 London bombings. The London attack is seen as connected to threats which al-Qaeda had made against the countries supporting USA in the occupation of Iraq, to which both the United Kingdom and Denmark contributed.

=== September ===
- 30 September – Jyllands-Posten, a Danish newspaper, publishes 12 editorial cartoons which depict Muhammad, which would later cause controversy and unrest.

=== October ===
- 15 October – Crown Princess Mary of Denmark gives birth to a healthy boy, expected to be named Prince Christian of Denmark. As the first child of Crown Prince Frederik of Denmark the boy is expected to become king one day. Prior to the birth there had been some speculation as to what would happen if the child was a girl; the Danish constitution says that any younger boys would be above this girl in the line of succession, while the present-day consensus in Denmark is that the girl should become Queen. There had been a good deal of speculation that this birth of a baby girl would be an opportunity to change the constitution with regard to both the line of succession and a number of other areas like human rights; but as the child was a boy this is no longer relevant.
- 17 October – Egyptian newspaper El Fagr publishes six of the cartoons during Ramadan along with an article strongly denouncing them. The publication of the images does not provoke any known protests from either Egyptian religious authorities nor the Egyptian government.
- 27 October – The police arrests 4 persons suspected to be part of an Islamic extremist terrorist cell planning suicide attacks. The arrests are reported to be connected to other arrests made in Bosnia; weapons and explosives have been found in Sarajevo. The following day two more Danes were arrested in Denmark.
- 27 October – A number of Muslim organizations file a complaint with the Danish police claiming that Jyllands-Posten had committed an offence under section 140 and 266b of the Danish Criminal Code.
- October – Taynikma, first volume of a Danish book series is published.

=== November ===
- 15 November – Elections are held at the municipality and regional levels.
- 16 November – First snow of winter, after an unusually warm autumn.

== The arts ==
=== Architecture ===
- 20 May – Jørn Utzon, designer of the Sydney Opera House, receives the Pritzker Prize at a ceremony in the Royal Academy of Fine Arts of San Fernando in Madrid.
- 17 June – 3XN's Sampension HQ in Copenhagen wins a 2005 RIBA European Award at the Royal Institute of British Architects' annual awards ceremony in London.
- September – Henning Larsen Architects' IT University of Copenhagen wins the Grand Prize at the 2nd LEAF Awards in London.

=== Television ===
- November – DR series The Eagler wins the Emmy Award for Best Drama Series at the 33rd International Emmy Awards.

== Sports ==
=== Badminton ===
- 21 August – Peter Gade wins a bronze medal in men's single at the 2005 IBF World Championships.
- Kastrup Magleby BK wins Europe Cup.

=== Cycling ===
- 1 February – Nicki Sørensen wins Grand Prix d'Ouverture La Marseillaise.
- 25 March – Alex Rasmussen wins gold in Men's scratch at the 2005 UCI Track Cycling World Championships in Los Angeles.
- 2–24 July – 2005 Tour de France
  - 10 July – Michael Rasmussen wins the 9th stage.
  - 24 July Michael Rasmussen finishes 6th and tops the Mountain classification in the 2005 Tour de France.
- 10 September – Lars Bak wins Tour de l'Avenir.
- Date unknown – Jimmi Madsen (DEN) and Jakob Piil (DEN) win the Six Days of Copenhagen six-day track cycling race.

=== Football ===
- 5 May – Brøndby IF wins the 2004–05 Danish Cup by defeating FC Midtjylland 2–1 in the final.
- 13 July – Brøndby IF wins the League Cup at Brøndby Stadium.
- 26 May – F.C. Copenhagen wins 2004–05 Royal League by defeating IFK Göteborg in the final.
- 17 August – Denmark beats England 4–1 in a friendly match at Parken Stadium in Copenhagen.
- 29 September – Brøndby IF, as the only Danish team, qualifies for the group stage of the UEFA Cup by beating FC Zürich 3–2.
- 12 October – In spite of having won their three last matches, Denmark only finishes third in Group 2 of the World Cup qualification and has therefore failed to qualify for 2006 FIFA World Cup in Germany.
- 15 December – Brøndby IF plays the last game in their UEFA Cup Ggroup B against Palermo. After only 1 victory (against M. Petach-Tikva) and 1 draw (against Espanyol) in four games, Brøndby ends 4th in the group and is finished in the tournament.

=== Golf ===
- 15 May – Thomas Bjørn wins The Daily Telegraph Dunlop Masters on the 2005 European Tour.
- 15 August – Thomas Bjørn wins the 2005 PGA Championship.

=== Other ===
- 27 March – 3 April – The 2005 Table Tennis European Championship takes place in Arhus.
  - 31 March – The Danish team wins gold at the 2009 European Table Tennis Championships.
- 8 June – Mikkel Kessler defends his WBA super-middleweight title against Anthony Mundine in Sydney, Australia.
- 19 June Tom Kristensen wins the Le Mans for the sixth year in a row, the seventh in total, when he wins the 2005 24 Hours of Le Mans with ADT Champion Racing.

== Births ==
=== January–March ===
- 8 January Theo Sander, footballer
- 25 January – Valdemar Byskov, footballer
- 29 January – Villads Nielsen, footballer

=== April–June ===
- 7 April – Conrad Harder, footballer

=== July–September ===
- 30 September – Thomas Jørgensen, footballer

=== October–December ===
- 5 October – Noah Nartey, footballer
- 15 October – Prince Christian of Denmark

== Deaths ==
=== January–March ===
- 17 February – Jens Martin Knudsen, astrophysicist (born 1930).

=== April–June ===
- 18 April – Claus Bjørn, author and historian (born 1944)
- 19 April – Niels-Henning Ørsted Pedersen, jazz bassist (born 1946).
- 23 April – Ebbe Kløvedal Reich, writer (born 1940)
- 17 June – Nanna Ditzel, designer (born 1923)

=== July–September ===
- 12 July – Axel Strøbye, actor (born 1928)
- 7 August – Sven Methling. film director and screenwriter (born 1918)

=== October–December ===
- 19 November – Erik Balling, TV and film director (born 1924)

== See also ==
- 2005 in Danish television
