= 2021 Slagelse municipal election =

← 2017	16 November 2021	2025 →

All 31 seats to the Slagelse Municipal Council 16 seats needed for a majority
- Turnout: 41,044 (63.7%) ▼5.9pp
	First party	Second party	Third party
	V	A	C
Party	Venstre	Social Democrats	Conservatives
Last election	10 seats, 29.1%	12 seats, 34.6%	0 seats, 2.2%
Seats won	11	9	3
Seat change	▲1	▼3	▲3
Popular vote	13,507	11,228	3,566
Percentage	33.6%	27.9%	8.9%
Swing	▲4.5%	▼6.7%	▲6.7%
	Fourth party	Fifth party	Sixth party
	D	F	B
Party	New Right	Green Left	Social Liberals
Last election	0 seats, 2.5%	2 seats, 6.0%	1 seat, 2.8%
Seats won	2	2	2
Seat change	▲2	0	▲1
Popular vote	2,814	2,530	1,932
Percentage	7.0%	6.3%	4.8%
Swing	▲4.5%	▲0.3%	▲2%
	Seventh party	Eighth party	Ninth party
	O	Ø	I
Party	Danish People's Party	Red–Green Alliance	Liberal Alliance
Last election	4 seats, 13.6%	1 seat, 4.2%	1 seat, 2.7%
Seats won	1	1	0
Seat change	▼3	0	▼1
Popular vote	2,174	1,640	409
Percentage	5.4%	4.1%	1.0%
Swing	▼8.2%	▼0.1%	▼1.7%
Mayor before election
John Dyrby Paulsen
Social Democrats
Mayor after election
Knud Vincents
Venstre

Following the last two elections in the municipality, a change of the party holding mayor's position had occurred.

In the last election, a dramatic deal that would see the Social Democrats and Liberal Alliance split the term in two periods, had been agreed upon. However Liberal Alliance decided to not take on the mayor's position, in the last two years as agreed.

In this election, Venstre would become the largest party for the first time in the municipality's history. (Note: counting from the 2007 municipal reform) They would win 11 seats, an increase of 1 compared to 2017. Social Liberals, the Conservatives and Venstre would eventually come to an agreement that would see Knud Vincents from Venstre become the new mayor of the municipality.

== Electoral system ==
For elections to Danish municipalities, a number varying from 9 to 31 are chosen to be elected to the municipal council. The seats are then allocated using the D'Hondt method and a closed list proportional representation. Slagelse Municipality had 31 seats in 2021

Unlike in Danish General Elections, in elections to municipal councils, electoral alliances are allowed.

== Electoral alliances ==
=== Electoral Alliance 1 ===
Party		Political alignment
C	Conservatives	Centre-right
D	New Right	Right-wing to Far-right
I	Liberal Alliance	Centre-right to Right-wing
V	Venstre	Centre-right

=== Electoral Alliance 2 ===
Party		Political alignment
B	Social Liberals	Centre to Centre-left
F	Green Left	Centre-left to Left-wing
G	Vegan Party	Single-issue
K	Christian Democrats	Centre to Centre-right

== Results by polling station ==
Division	A	B	C	D	F	G	I	K	O	V	Æ	Ø
Division	%	%	%	%	%	%	%	%	%	%	%	%
Dalmose	24.7	6.4	7.7	8.9	6.2	0.7	1.8	0.1	11.5	28.4	0.2	3.4
Flakkebjerg	21.4	5.0	9.8	10.4	6.6	0.0	1.0	0.0	7.8	33.0	0.4	4.6
Slots Bjergby	18.6	8.7	9.9	9.8	5.7	0.2	1.0	0.0	5.4	36.6	0.3	3.7
Sørbymagle	27.7	3.5	10.9	8.2	4.4	0.6	2.9	0.4	7.0	30.7	0.1	3.7
Korsør Søndre Bydel	35.4	4.9	7.8	7.4	5.4	0.7	0.8	0.5	5.0	28.0	0.4	3.7
Korsør Nordre Bydel	40.2	3.8	6.3	7.5	5.9	0.6	0.4	0.8	5.8	23.3	0.4	5.0
Tårnborg	32.2	2.7	7.7	10.5	6.6	0.7	0.7	0.5	5.5	29.6	0.1	3.4
Vemmelev	21.8	3.8	10.6	10.3	5.0	0.5	1.3	0.3	6.4	37.9	0.3	1.8
Søndermark	29.1	4.9	10.7	6.9	6.9	0.3	0.8	0.5	4.6	30.5	0.2	4.8
Rude	18.5	3.0	3.5	6.1	6.2	1.0	0.9	0.1	5.3	49.0	0.3	6.1
Skælskør Vest	26.5	6.1	5.3	4.0	5.7	0.7	0.1	0.1	5.4	40.2	0.1	5.8
Agersø	69.3	1.5	1.5	2.2	0.0	0.7	0.0	0.0	1.5	20.4	2.2	0.7
Magleby	20.7	8.2	6.1	10.2	3.4	0.3	0.7	0.0	6.8	40.1	0.0	3.4
Skælskør Øst	23.3	5.3	5.6	5.1	4.1	0.3	0.8	0.1	6.8	45.1	0.1	3.5
Eggeslevmagle	17.8	6.4	8.7	7.2	3.4	1.1	0.0	0.0	4.9	45.8	0.0	4.5
Boeslunde	19.8	4.6	9.0	7.8	3.7	1.0	1.0	0.1	7.8	39.3	0.1	5.6
Omø	60.6	1.8	1.8	1.8	3.7	1.8	0.0	0.0	4.6	13.8	0.0	10.1
Tjæreby	19.8	5.9	2.9	8.6	5.6	0.8	0.5	0.0	8.6	43.6	0.0	3.7
Slagelse Hallen	23.1	6.5	10.2	6.6	8.7	0.8	2.2	0.2	4.2	33.1	0.3	4.2
Antvorskov	26.7	5.0	11.1	5.9	7.2	0.6	1.1	0.2	3.8	34.4	0.2	3.8
Stillinge	26.0	2.4	10.7	6.9	6.0	0.3	0.4	0.3	5.7	38.6	0.1	2.6
Vestermose	18.6	3.8	11.3	8.0	6.7	0.7	1.5	0.1	6.4	40.5	0.0	2.4
Vesthallen	26.3	4.8	10.7	5.6	7.3	0.6	0.9	0.1	4.5	36.3	0.1	2.7
Nordhallen	29.9	4.7	9.8	6.0	7.0	0.5	1.2	0.3	4.8	30.2	0.3	5.4
Havrebjerg	28.2	2.6	6.5	6.8	8.2	0.0	1.8	0.0	6.8	35.0	0.0	4.1

== Results ==
Party		Votes	%	+/-	Seats	+/-
Slagelse Municipality
V	Venstre	13,507	33.56	+4.46	11	+1
A	Social Democrats	11,228	27.90	-6.67	9	-3
C	Conservatives	3,566	8.86	+6.63	3	+3
D	New Right	2,814	6.99	+4.52	2	+2
F	Green Left	2,530	6.29	+0.30	2	0
O	Danish People's Party	2,174	5.40	-8.18	1	-3
B	Social Liberals	1,932	4.80	+1.95	2	+1
Ø	Red-Green Alliance	1,640	4.07	-0.07	1	0
I	Liberal Alliance	409	1.02	-1.73	0	-1
G	Vegan Party	235	0.58	New	0	New
K	Christian Democrats	119	0.30	+0.13	0	0
Æ	Freedom List	94	0.23	New	0	New
Total		40,248	100	N/A	31	N/A
Invalid votes		123	0.19	+0.07		
Blank votes		673	1.04	+0.15		
Turnout		41,044	63.67	-5.94		
Source: valg.dk
