= 2025 Slagelse municipal election =

Municipal election in Denmark

← 2021	18 November 2025	2029 →

All 31 seats to the Slagelse municipal council 16 seats needed for a majority
- Turnout: 42,578 (64.7%) ▲1.0%
	First party	Second party	Third party
	V	A	O
Party	Venstre	Social Democrats	Danish People's Party
Last election	11 seats, 33.6%	9 seats, 27.9%	1 seat, 5.4%
Seats won	9	9	3
Seat change	▼2	0	▲2
Popular vote	10,552	10,498	3,988
Percentage	25.4%	25.2%	9.6%
Swing	▼8.2%	▼2.7%	▲4.2%
	Fourth party	Fifth party	Sixth party
	F	C	Æ
Party	Green Left	Conservatives	Denmark Democrats
Last election	2 seats, 6.3%	3 seats, 8.9%	Did not stand
Seats won	2	2	2
Seat change	0	▼1	▲2
Popular vote	3,394	2,883	2,645
Percentage	8.2%	6.9%	6.4%
Swing	▲1.9%	▼1.9%	New
	Seventh party	Eighth party	Ninth party
	Ø	I	L
Party	Red-Green Alliance	Liberal Alliance	Storebæltslisten
Last election	1 seat, 4.1%	0 seats, 1.0%	Did not stand
Seats won	1	1	1
Seat change	0	▲1	▲1
Popular vote	2,019	1,868	1,794
Percentage	4.9%	4.5%	4.3%
Swing	▲0.8%	▲3.5%	New
Mayor before election
Knud Vincents
Venstre
Mayor after election
TBD

The 2025 Slagelse Municipal election will be held on November 18, 2025, to elect the 31 members to sit in the regional council for the Slagelse Municipal council, in the period of 2026 to 2029.

== Background ==
Following the 2021 election, Knud Vincents from Venstre became mayor for his first term. He would run for re-election.

== Electoral system ==
For elections to Danish municipalities, a number varying from 9 to 31 are chosen to be elected to the municipal council. The seats are then allocated using the D'Hondt method and a closed list proportional representation. Slagelse Municipality had 31 seats in 2025.

== Electoral alliances ==
=== Electoral Alliance 1 ===
Party		Political alignment
A	Social Democrats	Centre-left
F	Green Left	Centre-left to Left-wing

=== Electoral Alliance 2 ===
Party		Political alignment
B	Social Liberals	Centre to Centre-left
L	Storebæltslisten	Local politics
T	Trelleborglisten	Local politics

=== Electoral Alliance 3 ===
Party		Political alignment
C	Conservatives	Centre-right
I	Liberal Alliance	Centre-right to Right-wing
V	Venstre	Centre-right
Æ	Denmark Democrats	Right-wing to Far-right

== Results by polling station ==
Division	A	B	C	F	I	L	M	O	R	T	V	Æ	Ø
Division	%	%	%	%	%	%	%	%	%	%	%	%	%
Vemmelev - Vemmelevhallen	19.1	0.9	12.2	5.6	4.0	3.9	0.9	11.5	0.2	2.1	26.3	11.0	2.2
Tårnborg - Taarnborg Forsamlingshus	23.9	2.1	4.8	5.9	3.2	19.8	0.6	11.2	0.9	1.0	16.3	6.5	3.9
Korsør - Broskolen	26.2	2.5	3.7	8.5	4.2	14.4	0.8	11.2	1.4	0.6	15.2	4.8	6.3
Korsør - Storebæltshallen	27.7	2.6	5.2	7.6	4.3	17.3	0.7	9.6	0.6	0.6	16.5	3.9	3.5
Boeslunde - Boeslunde Hallen	21.5	1.8	4.4	5.8	3.8	2.9	1.8	12.1	0.1	0.5	26.0	10.5	8.7
Skælskør - Skælskør Badmintoncenter	24.5	2.6	3.5	7.8	2.7	0.7	3.7	11.0	0.3	0.2	31.8	7.3	3.7
Agersø - Agersøhallen	70.6	0.0	2.5	0.0	1.7	0.0	0.0	3.4	0.8	0.8	13.4	5.0	1.7
Omø - Omø Forsamlingshus	39.6	0.9	0.0	7.5	1.9	0.0	0.9	4.7	0.0	0.0	23.6	8.5	12.3
Rude - Kirkeskovskolen	15.5	2.0	1.9	10.5	2.8	0.6	0.6	8.8	0.2	0.1	46.7	3.8	6.4
Dalmose - Dalmosehallen	26.0	2.7	5.4	6.2	3.5	1.5	1.1	13.3	0.6	0.4	23.8	12.0	3.5
Slots Bjergby - Hashøjskolen	22.7	4.1	5.9	6.5	4.9	0.7	0.6	9.6	0.4	0.6	32.8	9.1	2.1
Sørbymagle - Sørbymagle forsamlingshus	28.4	2.7	5.8	7.5	7.9	1.1	1.1	10.3	0.3	0.5	22.8	8.5	3.2
Vestermose - Hallelev Forsamlingshus	16.2	3.4	8.5	6.8	5.6	1.0	1.4	10.0	0.4	0.7	30.5	12.8	2.7
Stillinge - Stillingehallen	23.1	1.9	6.7	8.5	3.1	1.1	0.6	9.3	0.3	0.4	32.0	10.2	2.8
Slagelse - Vesthallen	26.2	2.6	9.6	9.2	4.5	0.5	0.7	6.6	0.2	0.7	29.8	6.0	3.4
Slagelse - Nordhallen	26.6	3.0	9.0	7.9	5.4	0.8	0.7	9.1	0.2	0.5	24.9	4.7	7.1
Slagelse - Søndermarkshallen	29.3	3.3	8.2	9.2	4.2	0.7	0.7	8.7	0.5	0.4	23.6	4.6	6.7
Slagelse - Slagelse Hallen	24.2	3.0	9.2	10.1	6.4	0.7	0.8	8.2	0.3	0.4	25.9	4.6	6.2

== Results ==
Party		Votes	%	+/-	Seats	+/-
Slagelse Municipality
V	Venstre	10,552	25.35	-8.21	9	-2
A	Social Democrats	10,498	25.22	-2.68	9	0
O	Danish People's Party	3,988	9.58	+4.18	3	+2
F	Green Left	3,394	8.15	+1.87	2	0
C	Conservatives	2,883	6.93	-1.93	2	-1
Æ	Denmark Democrats	2,645	6.35	New	2	New
Ø	Red-Green Alliance	2,019	4.85	+0.78	1	0
I	Liberal Alliance	1,868	4.49	+3.47	1	+1
L	Storebæltslisten	1,794	4.31	New	1	New
B	Social Liberals	1,106	2.66	-2.14	1	-1
M	Moderates	459	1.10	New	0	New
T	Trelleborglisten	228	0.55	New	0	New
R	De lokale rebeller	190	0.46	New	0	New
Total		41,624	100	N/A	31	N/A
Invalid votes		159	0.24	+0.05		
Blank votes		795	1.21	+0.21		
Turnout		42,578	64.70	+1.03		
Source: valg.dk

== Opinion polls ==
Polling firm	Fieldwork date	Sample size	V	A	C	F	O	B	Ø	I	L	M	R	T	Æ	Others	Lead
Epinion	4 Sep - 13 Oct 2025	471	24.7	27.7	3.9	9.7	11.8	1.1	4.0	5.7	–	1.9	–	–	8.0	1.6	3.0
2024 european parliament election	9 Jun 2024		16.2	19.1	8.3	13.5	9.9	4.2	4.7	6.6	–	6.7	–	–	8.7	–	2.9
2022 general election	1 Nov 2022		14.8	31.9	3.8	8.0	3.9	1.8	2.9	6.3	–	9.9	–	–	9.2	–	17.1
2021 regional election	16 Nov 2021		27.2	34.6	8.4	5.4	5.7	3.3	4.7	1.7	–	–	–	–	–	–	7.4
2021 municipal election	16 Nov 2021		33.6 (11)	27.9 (9)	8.9 (3)	6.3 (2)	5.4 (1)	4.8 (2)	4.1 (1)	1.0 (0)	–	–	–	–	–	–	5.7
