= Sprogø =

Island in Denmark

Coordinates: 55°20′N 10°58′E

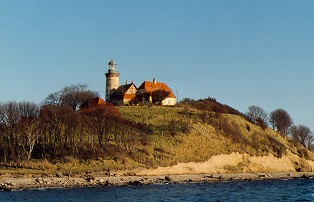
The "old" part of Sprogø seen from the south side of the island

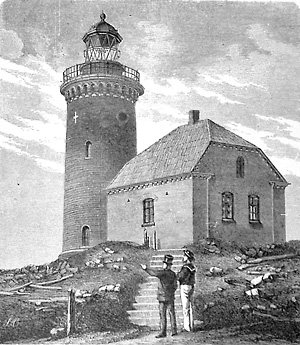
Late 19th century depiction of Sprogø lighthouse

Sprogø (Danish pronunciation: [ˈspʁɔwˌøˀ]) is a small Danish island, located in the Great Belt, the strait that separates the main islands of Funen and Zealand. It is about halfway across the strait, 6.7 kilometres (4.2 miles) from the Zealand shore and 8 kilometres (5 miles) from the Funen shore.

Although sprog is modern Danish for language, the island's name was recorded originally during the 12th century as Sproøe meaning scout's island, from the old Danish verb spro (to scout).

Today, the island is crossed by part of the Great Belt Fixed Link, a series of roads, bridges, and tunnels; it is connected to Funen by a road and rail bridge, and to Zealand by both a road suspension bridge and twin rail tunnels. During the construction, the island was reconfigured drastically, with land reclamation increasing its area from 38 to 154 hectares (94 to 381 acres).

There are remains of buildings on the original part of Sprogø from the beginning of the 12th century, a fortress built by order of King Valdemar the Great. During construction work, extensive archaeological investigations were undertaken, and among other findings it was revealed that the first inhabitants arrived more than 8,000 years ago.

The island does not have any permanent population today, but is used by Sund og Bælt, the company that owns and operates the bridges nearby. It is also a nature reserve, and tours of the island are organised.

Sprogø island (map center) is west of Zealand island, east of Funen, NW of Agersø island, between main towns Nyborg and Korsør. Road/rail bridges join Knudshoved to Sprogø, with bridge and rail tunnels to Halsskov.

Sprogø was a station for the semaphore line across the Belt, Storebæltstelegrafen, between Nyborg and Korsør, in operation between 1801 and 1865. Between 1923 and 1961 the island was used for containment of women deemed pathologically promiscuous, the main concern being unwanted pregnancies, operated by the so-called Keller Institutions. At the time the practice was considered humane, given that they had been confined previously. The legacy of confinements on Sprogø inspired the fictional plot of the 2018 Danish movie thriller Journal 64.

The lighthouse, which can be seen in the picture, was built by the mail service during 1868, replacing an older structure from 1809. It was built on the foundations of the 12th-century fortress.

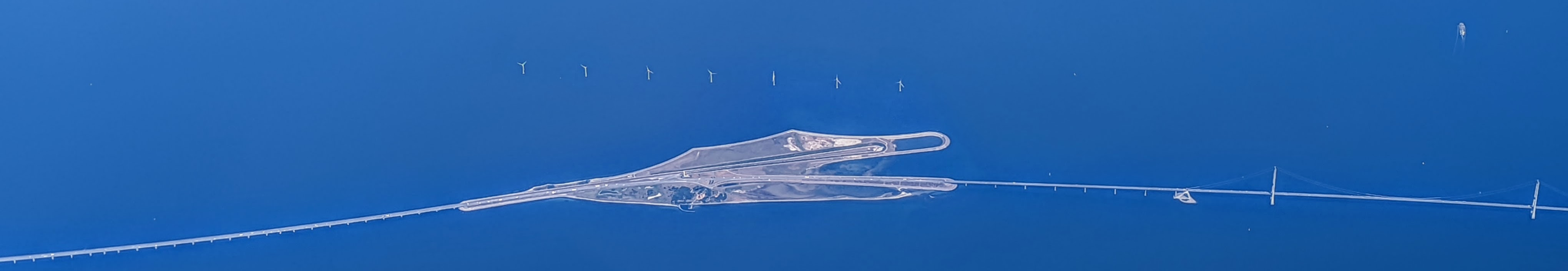
Aerial view of Sprogø and the Great Belt fixed link
