= Great Belt ferries =

Series of Danish ships, 1883 to 1998

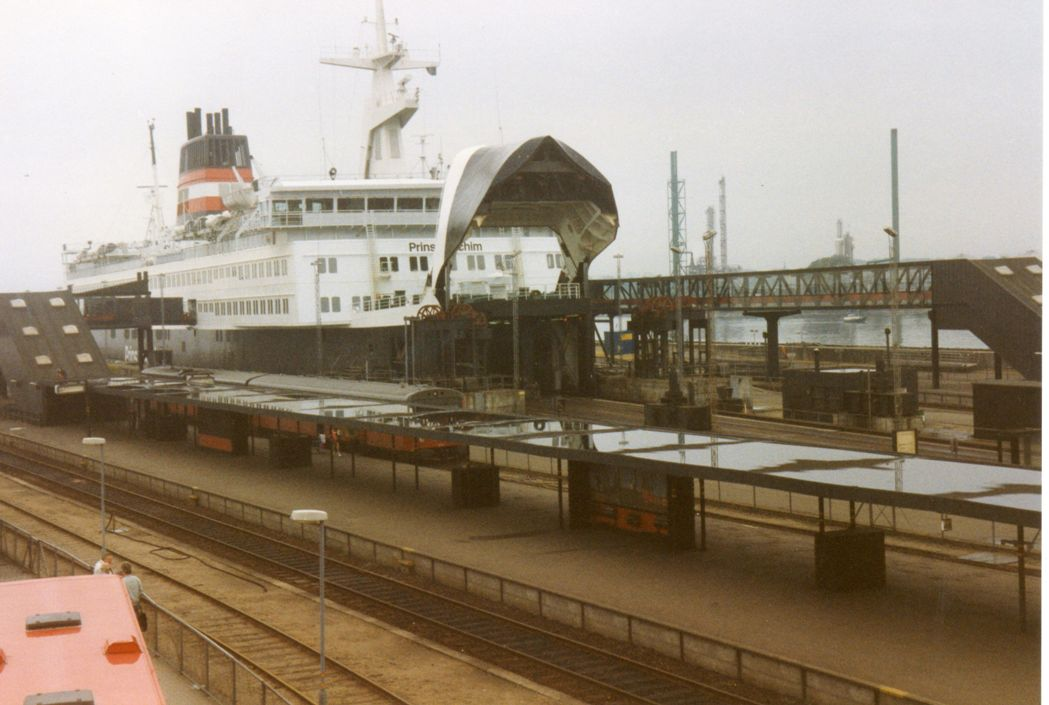
Train ferry M/F Prins Joachim arrives in Nyborg, 1991/92.

The Great Belt ferries (Danish: Storebæltsfærgerne) were the train and car ferries operating across the Danish strait of Great Belt, between the islands of Zealand and Funen. The railway ferry link was established in 1883, while automobile-only ferries started operating in 1930. The ferry services ceased operating with the opening of the Great Belt Fixed Link, which occurred in 1997 for rail and 1998 for car traffic.

Despite the popularity of the fixed link, some ferries still connect eastern and western Denmark. The company Mols-Linien continues to operate ferries between northwest Zealand and East Jutland, while the Spodsbjerg–Tårs route some 45 kilometres to the south also remains serviced by ferries.

== History ==
Railway ferries had started service across another Danish strait, the much smaller Little Belt, in March 1872. A railway ferry service across the Great Belt was debated as early as 1872–75, but political unwillingness and objections from the board of Det sjællandske Jernbaneselskab, the major railway company on Zealand, delayed the decision. However, the company was nationalised in 1880, and in 1881, it was decided to establish the service. The first Great Belt ferries, H/F Korsør and H/F Nyborg, went into service on 1 December 1883. The railway nationalisation led to the creation in 1885 of the national railway company DSB, which would operate the ferries almost until the opening of the fixed link.

For several decades, the ferry service operated on railway terms. Discontent with the high prices, infrequent departures and cramped conditions on the combined train and car ferries, the motorists' organisation FDM established their own shipping company, Motorejernes Færgefart A/S, in 1929, and ordered a modern automobile-only ferry, M/F Heimdal. DSB responded by getting authorisation to buy a car ferry of their own, but eventually made a settlement with the motorists and took over Heimdal before it entered service in 1930.

Car traffic increased explosively in the post-war years, leading to severe capacity problems on the ferry services. In 1954, it was decided to establish a new car ferry service between Halsskov and Knudshoved, slightly north of the existing Korsør–Nyborg service and connected to a newly constructed motorway. The service opened on 28 May 1957.

In the 1990s, with the expected opening of the fixed link, state interest in ferry operation waned. The shipping division of DSB was therefore split off into a separate, state-owned company, DSB Rederi A/S, in 1995, which was renamed Scandlines Danmark A/S in 1997.

The last service was operated by M/F Arveprins Knud and departed Knudshoved at 10:15 pm. on 14 June 1998, fifteen minutes after the Great Belt Fixed Link was opened for regular traffic. During the crossing, Danish pop rock group TV-2 performed a concert on the ship's sun deck. Upon arriving at Halsskov, the ferry was greeted by a large torchlight procession.

In 2026, the State-owned Great Belt bridge company requested offers to reinstate the old ferry berths, as a reserve connection if the bridge service fails due to international tensions.

== Legacy ==
No ferries are, as of 2009, preserved in Great Belt service order. M/F Kong Frederik IX was preserved as a museum in Nyborg from 1997 to 2001, but scrapped in 2005 despite continued efforts to save it.
