= Great Belt Bridge =

Bridge–tunnel road and railway crossing of the Great Belt in Denmark

Great Belt Bridge (East Bridge)
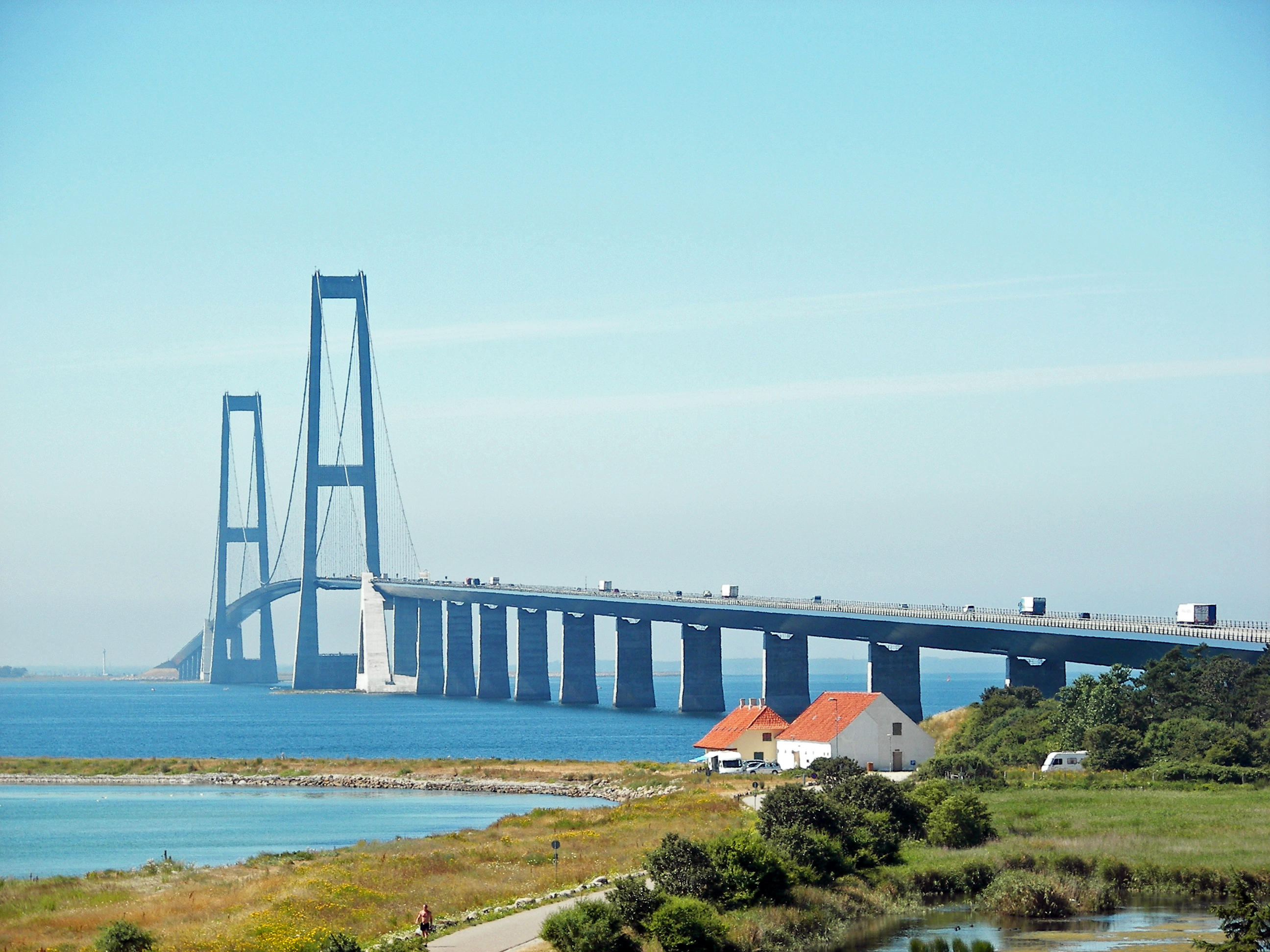
- The East Bridge as seen from the Zealand side
- Coordinates: 55°20′31″N 11°02′10″E
- Carries: 4 lanes of E20
- Crosses: Great Belt
- Official name: Østbroen
- Maintained by: A/S Storebælt

Characteristics
- Design: Suspension bridge
- Material: Concrete and steel
- Total length: 6,790 metres (22,277 ft)
- Width: 31 metres (102 ft)
- Height: 254 metres (833 ft)
- Longest span: 1,624 metres (5,328 ft)
- Piers in water: 19
- Clearance below: 65 metres (213 ft)

History
- Designer: COWI, Ramboll & Dissing+Weitling
- Constructed by: Hochtief, Skanska, Højgaard & Schultz and Monberg & Thorsen
- Construction start: 1991
- Construction end: 1998
- Opened: 14 June 1998

Statistics
- Toll: 275 DKK (€37/$40) per car.

Location
- Interactive map of Great Belt Bridge (East Bridge)

The Great Belt Bridge (Danish: Storebæltsbroen) or Great Belt fixed link (Danish: Storebæltsforbindelsen) is a multi-element fixed link crossing the Great Belt strait between the Danish islands of Zealand and Funen. It consists of a road suspension bridge and a railway tunnel between Zealand and the small island Sprogø in the middle of the Great Belt, and a box-girder bridge for both road and rail traffic between Sprogø and Funen. The total length is 18 kilometres (11 mi).

The term Great Belt Bridge commonly refers to the suspension bridge, although it may also be used to mean the box-girder bridge, especially when discussing the railway, or the link in its entirety. Together with the New Little Belt Bridge, the Great Belt link provides a continuous road and rail connection between Copenhagen and the Danish mainland (the Jutland Peninsula of the European continent). It has the world's seventh-longest main span (1.6 km (1 mi)). Operation and maintenance of the bridge are performed by A/S Storebælt under Sund & Bælt. Maintenance and the original construction are financed by tolls on vehicles and trains making use of the bridge.

Officially named the East Bridge, the suspension bridge was designed by the Danish firms COWI and Ramboll, and the architecture firm Dissing+Weitling. The construction and assembly of the suspended deck were carried out by the company Alsthom Sdem with the consultancy of the Italian Studio de Miranda Associati under the direction of Mario de Miranda. The link replaced the Great Belt ferries service, which had been the primary means of crossing the Great Belt. After more than 50 years of debate, the Danish government decided in 1986 to construct a link; the bridge opened to rail traffic in 1997 and to road traffic in 1998, at the time the world's second longest, beaten by the Akashi Kaikyō Bridge opened a few months previously. At an estimated cost of DKK 21.4 billion (EUR 2.8 billion) (1988 prices), the link is the largest construction project in Danish history. It has reduced travel times significantly; previously taking one hour by ferry, the Great Belt can now be crossed in ten minutes. This link, together with the Øresund Bridge (built 1995–1999) and the Little Belt Bridge, have together enabled driving from mainland Europe to Sweden through Denmark.

== History ==
The Great Belt ferries entered service between the coastal towns of Korsør and Nyborg in 1883, connecting the railway lines on either side of the Belt. In 1957, road traffic was moved to the Halsskov–Knudshoved route, about 1.5 kilometres to the north and close to the fixed link.

Construction drafts for a fixed link were presented as early as the 1850s, with several suggestions appearing in the following decades. The Danish State Railways, responsible for the ferry service, presented plans for a bridge in 1934. The concepts of bridges over Øresund (152 million DKK) and Storebælt (257 million DKK) were calculated around 1936. In 1948, the Ministry for Public Works (now the Ministry of Transport) established a commission to investigate the implications of a fixed link.

The first law concerning a fixed link was enacted in 1973, but the project was put on hold in 1978 as the Venstre (Liberal) party demanded postponing public spending. Political agreement to restart work was reached in 1986, with a construction law (Danish: anlægslov) being passed in 1987.

The design was carried out by the engineering firms COWI and Ramboll together with Dissing+Weitling architecture practice.

Construction of the link commenced in 1988. In 1991, Finland sued Denmark at the International Court of Justice, on the grounds that Finnish-built mobile offshore drilling units would be unable to pass beneath the bridge. The two countries negotiated a financial compensation of 90 million Danish kroner, and Finland withdrew the lawsuit in 1992.

A European Court of Justice ruling in 1993 found that a contractual condition requiring use of local labour and local materials in constructing the bridge was incompatible with the principles of the EEC Treaty.

In 2014 the Danish ministry of transportation released a socio-economic impact study detailing how the link is projected to create 379 billion DKK of socio-economic value after 50 years of use.

In 2022, the bridge was crossed as part of the route of Stage 2 of the 2022 Tour de France.

== Construction ==
The West Bridge
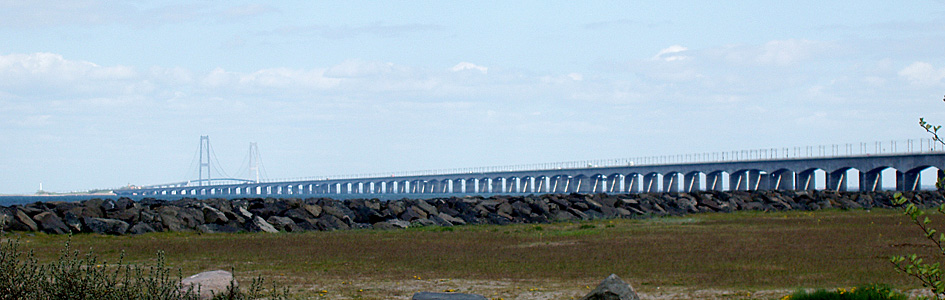
- The West Bridge (foreground) seen from Nyborg at Funen.
- Coordinates: 55°18′42″N 10°54′23″E
- Carries: Motor vehicles, trains
- Crosses: Great Belt
- Official name: Vestbroen
- Maintained by: A/S Storebælt

Characteristics
- Design: Box girder bridge
- Total length: 6,611 metres (21,690 ft)
- Width: 25 metres (82 ft)
- Longest span: 110 metres (361 ft)
- Piers in water: 62
- Clearance below: 18 metres (59 ft)

History
- Construction start: 1988
- Construction end: 1994
- Opened: 1 June 1997 (rail traffic); 14 June 1998 (road traffic)

Location
- Interactive map of The West Bridge

The East Tunnel
- Interactive map of The East Tunnel

Overview
- Official name: Østtunnelen
- Location: Great Belt
- Coordinates: 55°21′15″N 11°01′59″E
- Status: Active
- Start: Halsskov
- End: Sprogø

Operation
- Traffic: Trains
- Character: Mainline railway

Technical
- Length: 8,024 metres (4.986 mi)
- Track gauge: 1,435 mm (4 ft 8 1/2 in)
- Electrified: 25 kV AC 50 Hz
- Max elevation: −15.1 metres (−50 ft)
- Min elevation: −75 metres (−246 ft)
- Grade: 16 ‰ (max)

The construction of the fixed link became the biggest building project in the history of Denmark. In order to connect Halsskov on Zealand with Knudshoved on Funen, 18 kilometres (11 mi) to its west, a two-track railway and a four-lane motorway had to be built, via the small island of Sprogø in the middle of the Great Belt. The project comprised three different tasks: the East Bridge for road transport, the East Tunnel for rail transport and the West Bridge for road and rail transport combined. The construction work was carried out by Sundlink Contractors, a consortium of Skanska, Hochtief, Højgaard & Schultz (which built the West Bridge) and Monberg & Thorsen (which built the eight-kilometre (5.0 mi) section under the Great Belt). The work of lifting and placing the elements was carried out by Ballast Nedam using a floating crane.

=== East Bridge ===
Built between 1991 and 1998 at a cost of US$950 million, the East Bridge (Østbroen) is a suspension bridge between Halsskov and Sprogø. It is 6,790 metres (4.219 mi) long with a free span of 1,624 metres (5,328 ft). The East Bridge had been planned to be completed in time to be the longest bridge in the world, but there were delays in construction. In the end, the Akashi-Kaikyo Bridge opened two months earlier than the East Bridge.

The vertical clearance for ships is 65 metres (213 ft), meaning the world's largest cruise ship, an Icon-class cruise ship, just fits under with additional ballast and its smokestack folded. At 254 metres (833 ft) above sea level, the two pylons of the East Bridge are the highest points on self-supporting structures in Denmark. Some radio masts, such as Tommerup transmitter, are taller.

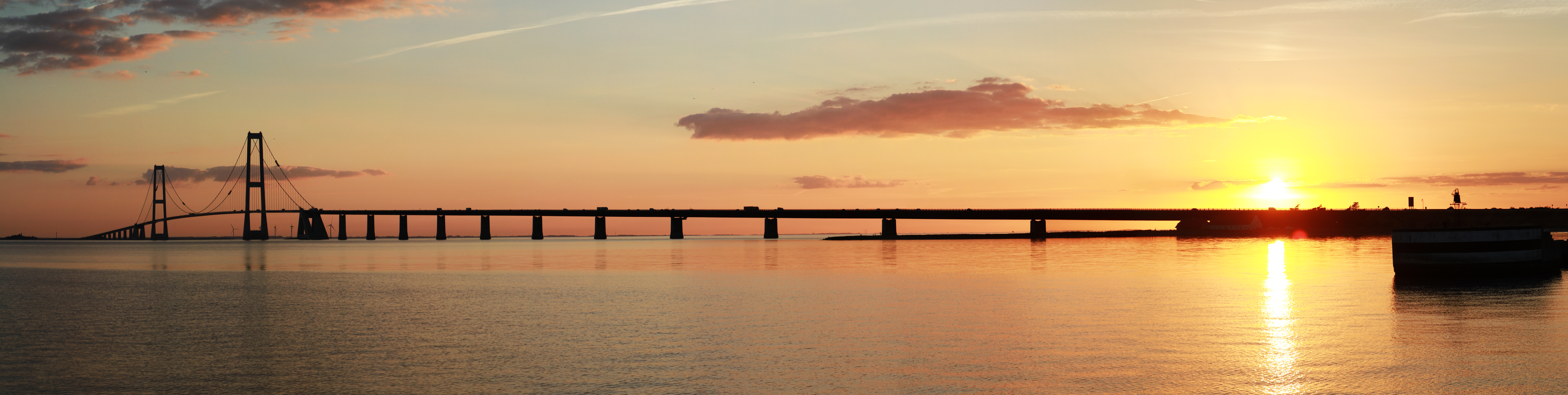
Panoramic picture of the East Bridge

To keep the main cables tensioned, an anchorage structure on each side of the span is placed below the road deck. After 15 years, the cables have no rust. They were scheduled for a 15 million DKK paint job, but due to corroding cables on other bridges, the decision was made to instead install a 70 million DKK sealed de-humidifying system in the cables. This was carried out by UK engineering firm Spencer Group, with help from Danish subcontractors Davai who provided the manpower, and Belvent A/S who provided the dehumidification system. Nineteen concrete pillars (12 on the Zealand side, seven by Sprogø), 193 metres (633 ft) apart, carry the road deck outside the span.

=== West Bridge ===
The West Bridge (Vestbroen) is a box girder bridge between Sprogø and Knudshoved. It is 6,611 metres (4.108 mi) long, and has a vertical clearance for ships of 18 metres (59 ft). It is actually two separate, adjacent bridges: the northern one carries rail traffic and the southern one road traffic. The pillars of the two bridges rest on common foundations below sea level. The West Bridge was built between 1988 and 1994; its road/rail deck comprises 63 sections, supported by 62 pillars.

=== East Tunnel ===
The twin bored tunnel tubes of the East Tunnel (Østtunnelen) are each 8,024 m (4.986 miles) long. There are 31 connecting tunnels between the two main tunnels, at 250 metres (820 ft) intervals. The equipment that is necessary for train operation in the tunnels is installed in the connecting tunnels, which also serve as emergency escape routes.

There were delays and cost overruns in the tunnel construction. The plan was to open it in 1993, giving the trains a head start of three years over road traffic, but train traffic started in 1997 and road traffic in 1998. During construction the sea bed gave way and one of the tunnels was flooded. The water continued to rise and reached the end at Sprogø, where it continued into the (still dry) other tunnel. The water damaged two of the four tunnel boring machines, but no workers were injured. Only by placing a clay blanket on the sea bed was it possible to dry out the tunnels. The two damaged machines were repaired and the majority of the tunnelling was undertaken from the Sprogø side. The machines on the Zealand side tunnelled through difficult ground and made little progress. A major fire on one of the Zealand machines in June 1994 stopped these drives and the tunnels were completed by the two Sprogø machines.

A total of 320 compressed air workers were involved in 9,018 pressure exposures in the four tunnel-boring machines. The project had a decompression sickness incidence of 0.14% with two workers having long-term residual symptoms.

== Traffic implications ==
Site of Great Belt Bridge in Denmark

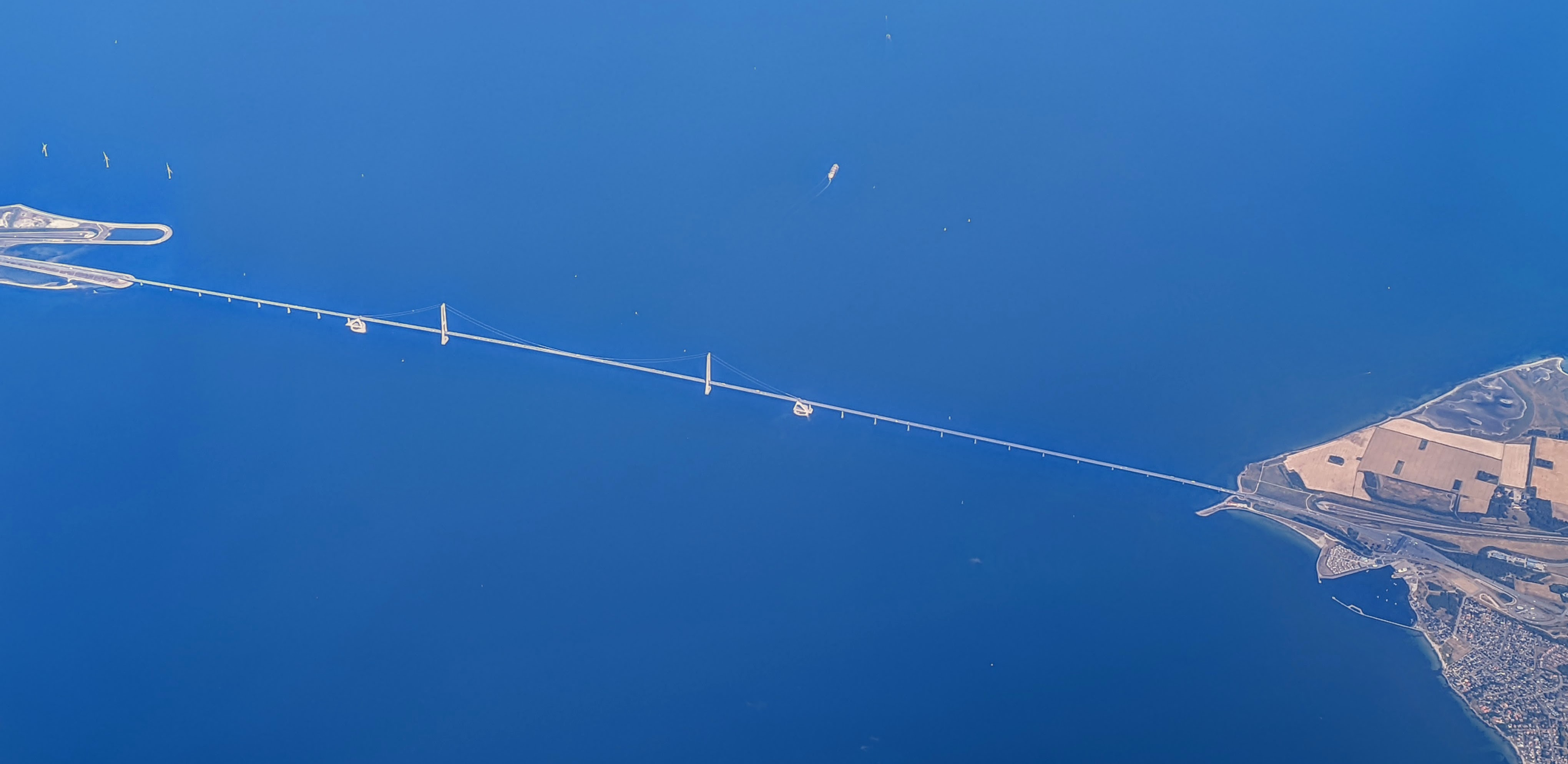
Aerial view of the eastern portion, with the East Bridge, or Storebæltsbroen

Prior to the opening of the link, an average of 8,000 cars used the ferries across the Great Belt every day. The traffic across the strait increased 127 percent over the first year after the link's opening due to the so-called traffic leap: new traffic generated by the improved ease, facility and lower price of crossing the Great Belt. In 2021, an average of 34,100 vehicles used the link each day. On 7 August 2022 a record 61,528 vehicles passed the bridge in 24 hours. The increase in traffic is partly caused by the general growth of traffic, partly diversion of traffic volume from other services via ferry and services.

The fixed link has produced considerable savings in travel time between eastern and western Denmark. Previously, it took approximately 90 minutes on average to cross the Great Belt in a car with transfer by ferry, including the waiting time at the ports. It took considerably longer during peak periods, such as weekends and holidays. With the opening of the link, the journey is now between 10 and 15 minutes.

By train the time savings are significant as well. The journey has been reduced by 60 minutes, and there are many more seats available because more carriages may be added to a train that does not have to fit on a ferry. The seating capacity offered by DSB across the Great Belt on an ordinary Wednesday has risen from 11,060 seats to 37,490 seats. On Fridays the seating capacity exceeds 40,000 seats.

The shortest travel times are: Copenhagen–Odense 1 hour 15 minutes, Copenhagen–Aarhus 2 hours 30 minutes, Copenhagen–Aalborg 3 hours 55 minutes and Copenhagen–Esbjerg 2 hours 35 minutes.

Flights between Copenhagen and Odense, and between Copenhagen and Esbjerg have ceased, and the train now has the largest market share between Copenhagen and Aarhus.

Together with the Øresund Bridge, and the two Little Belt Bridges (the Old and the New), the link provides a direct fixed connection between western Continental Europe and northern Scandinavia, eventually connecting all parts of the European Union except Ireland, Malta, Cyprus, and outlying islands. Most people from Zealand still prefer to take the ferry between Puttgarden and Rødby, as it is a much shorter distance and provides a needed break for those travelling a long distance.

For freight trains, the fixed links are a large improvement between Sweden and Germany, and between Sweden and the UK. The Sweden-to-Germany ferry system is still used to some extent owing to limited rail capacity, with heavy passenger traffic over the bridges and some single track stretches in southern Denmark and northern Germany.

The Great Belt was used by now defunct night passenger trains between Copenhagen and Germany, which were too long to fit on the ferries. Day trains on the Copenhagen-Hamburg route first continued to use the Fehmarn Belt ferries, utilising short diesel trains, but now also use the Great Belt route, which potentially allows longer trains to be used, increasing capacity.

By 2028, the Fehmarn Belt Fixed Link is expected to be complete with much of the international traffic being shifted from the Great Belt Fixed Link. This more direct route will reduce the rail journey from Hamburg to Copenhagen from 4:45 to 3:30 hours.

Cyclists are not permitted to use the bridge, but bicycles may be transported by train or bus.

=== Toll charge ===
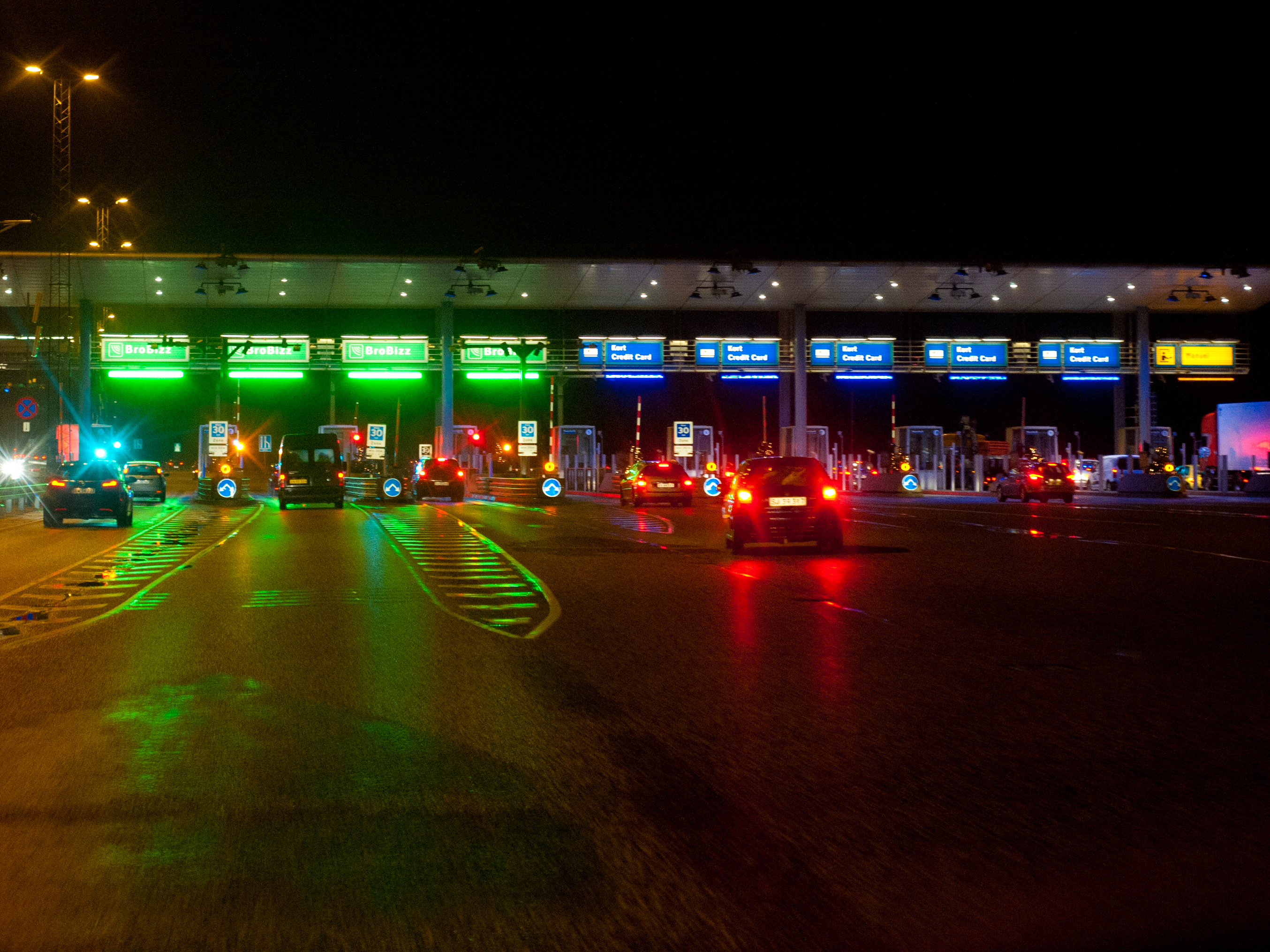
The toll area at night. Each booth can be used for electronic toll collection (green booths), credit card (blue booths) or manual payment (yellow booths), depending on the load on each payment method.

In 2019, the vehicle tolls were:

Vehicle	One trip	One day return	Notes
Standard car	245 DKK (€35)	Vary	Discounted price at 193.80 DKK for using BroBizz and being part of Club Storebælt.
Motorcycle	130 DKK (€18)	(N/A)	Solo motorcycles only. Trailer combinations charged at 245 DKK (€35).
Motorhome, 6–10 m	370 DKK (€52)	(N/A)	Total weight up to 3,500 kg. Motorhomes over 3,500 kg charged at 610 DKK (€85).
Tourist bus, 10–20 m	965 DKK (€135)	(N/A)	—
Comparing with trains, shortest possible crossing of the Belt (Nyborg to Korsør): 106 DKK (standard ticket). Discounted DSB Orange ticket from 25 DKK.

== Environmental effects ==
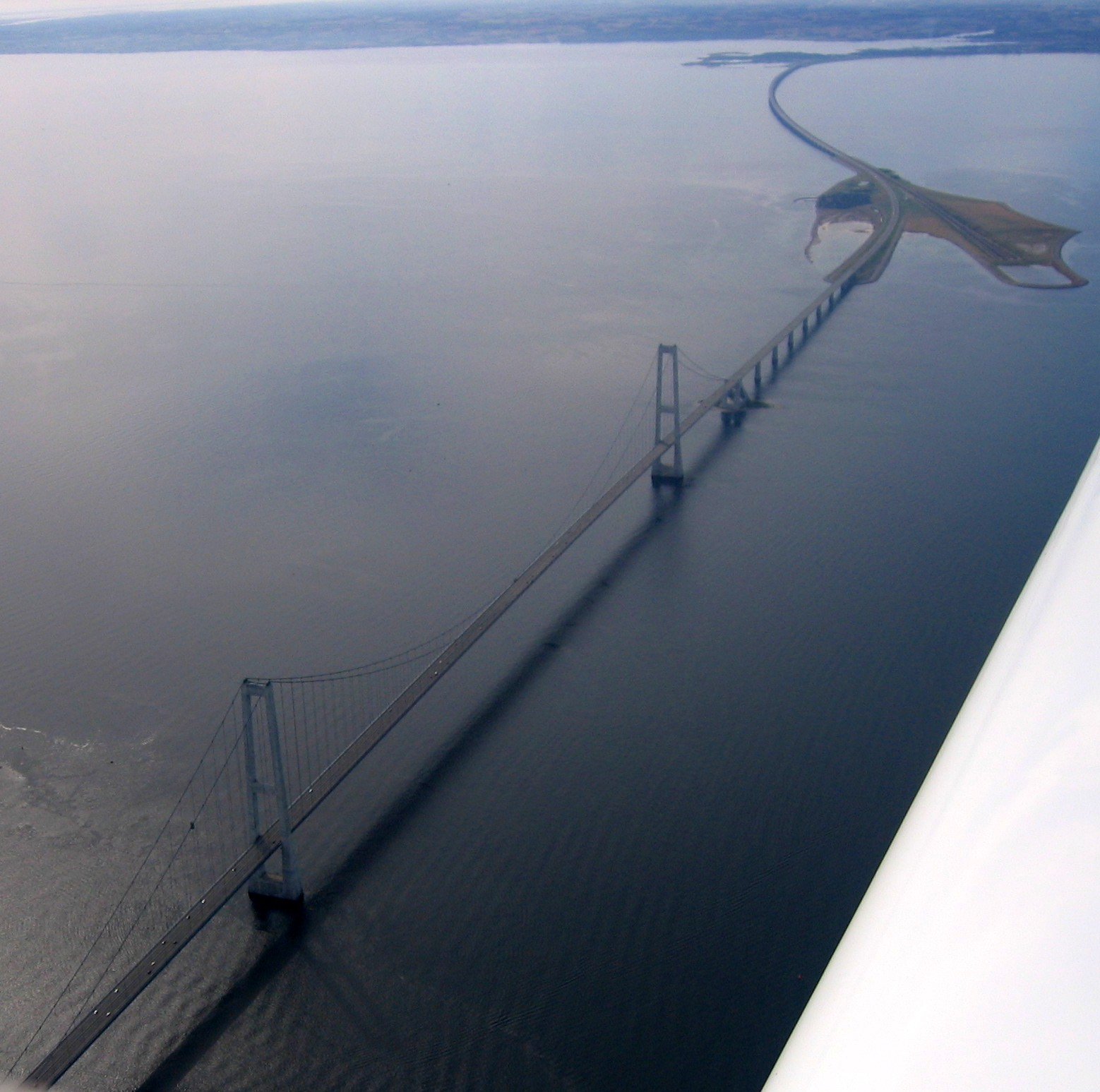
The East Bridge as seen from above.

Environmental considerations have been an integral part of the project, and have been of decisive significance for the choice of alignment and determination of the design. Great Belt A/S established an environmental monitoring programme in 1988, and initiated co-operation with authorities and external consultants on the definition of environmental concerns during the construction work and the professional requirements to the monitoring programme. This co-operation issued in a report published at the beginning of 1997 on the state of the environment in the Great Belt. The conclusion of the report was that the marine environment was at least as good as before construction work began.

With regards to the water flow, the link must comply with the so-called zero-solution. This has been achieved by deepening parts of the Great Belt, so that the water flow cross section has been increased. This excavation compensates for the blocking effect caused by the bridge pylons and approach ramps. The conclusion of the report is that water flows are now almost at the level they were before the bridge was built.

The fixed link has generated increased road traffic volume, which has meant increased air pollution. However, there has been significant savings in the energy consumption by switching from ferries to the fixed link. Train and car ferries consume much energy for propulsion, high-speed ferries consume large amounts of energy at high speeds, and air transport is highly energy consuming. Domestic air travel over the Great Belt was greatly reduced after the opening of the bridge, with the former air travellers now using trains and private cars.

The larger energy consumption by ferries as opposed to via the fixed link is most clearly seen when comparing short driving distances from areas immediately east or west of the link. For more extended driving distances the difference in energy consumption is smaller, but any transport within Denmark across the link shows very clear energy savings.

During 2009, seven large wind turbines, likely Vestas 3 MW totalling 21 MW capacity, were erected in the sea north of Sprogø to contribute to the electrical demand of the Great Belt Link. Their hub heights are about the same level as the road deck of the suspension bridge. Part of the project was to showcase sea wind at the December 2009 Copenhagen climate meeting.

== Accidents ==
During construction 479 work-related accidents were reported, of which 53 resulted in serious injuries or death. Seven workers died as a result of work-related accidents.

The West Bridge has been struck by sea traffic twice. While the link was still under construction on 14 September 1993, the ferry M/F Romsø drifted off course in bad weather and hit the West Bridge. At 19:17 on 3 March 2005, the 3,500-ton freighter MV Karen Danielsen crashed into the West Bridge 800 metres from Funen. The bridge reopened around 01:30, after the freighter was pulled free and inspectors had found no structural damage to the bridge.

The East Bridge has so far been in the clear, although on 16 May 2001, the bridge was closed for 10 minutes as the Cambodian 27,000-ton bulk carrier Bella was heading straight for one of the anchorage structures. The ship was deflected by a swift response from the navy.

On 5 June 2006, a maintenance vehicle burst into flames in the east-bound railway tunnel at about 21:30. Nobody was hurt; its crew of three fled to the other tunnel and escaped. The fire was put out shortly before midnight, and the vehicle was removed from the tunnel the next day. Train service resumed on 6 June at reduced speed, and normal service was restored on 12 June.

On 2 January 2019, eight people were killed in a train accident on the West Bridge. A passenger train was hit by a semi-trailer that fell off a freight train travelling in the opposite direction.

In 2023, a 57-year-old truck driver was arrested by police after traffic on the bridge was disrupted due to spilled potatoes. Police stated that they were working on the hypothesis that the potatoes were either planted intentionally or as an accident.

== Operations ==
In 2009, a study characterized the rail tunnel (together with other major projects like the Channel Tunnel between England and France) as financially non-viable.

== Gallery ==
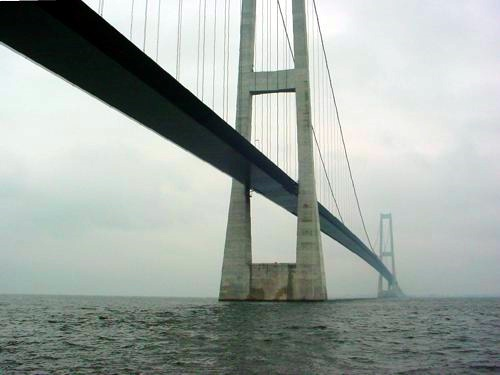
The East Bridge from below

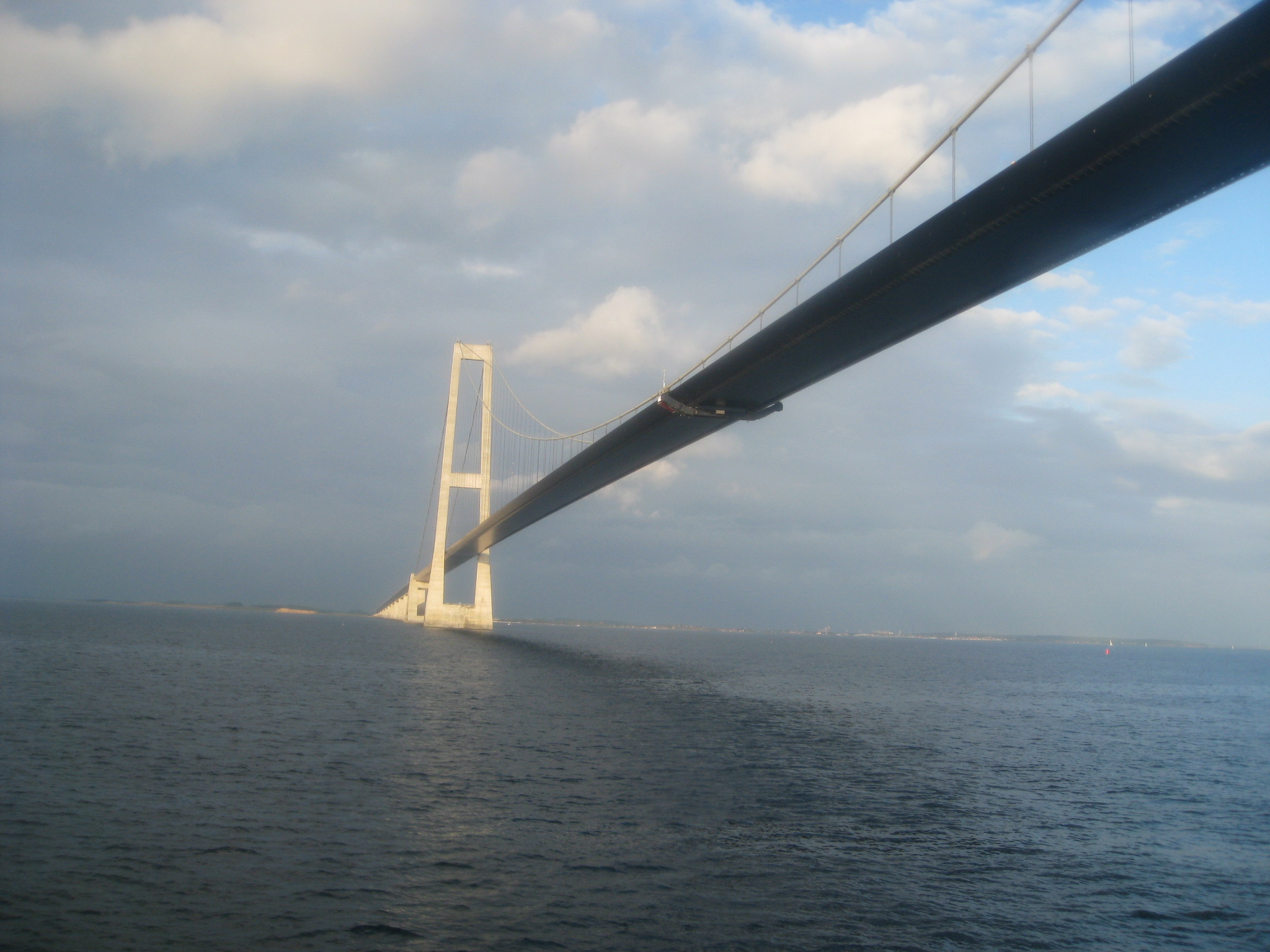
View from below the East Bridge south-east toward Korsør

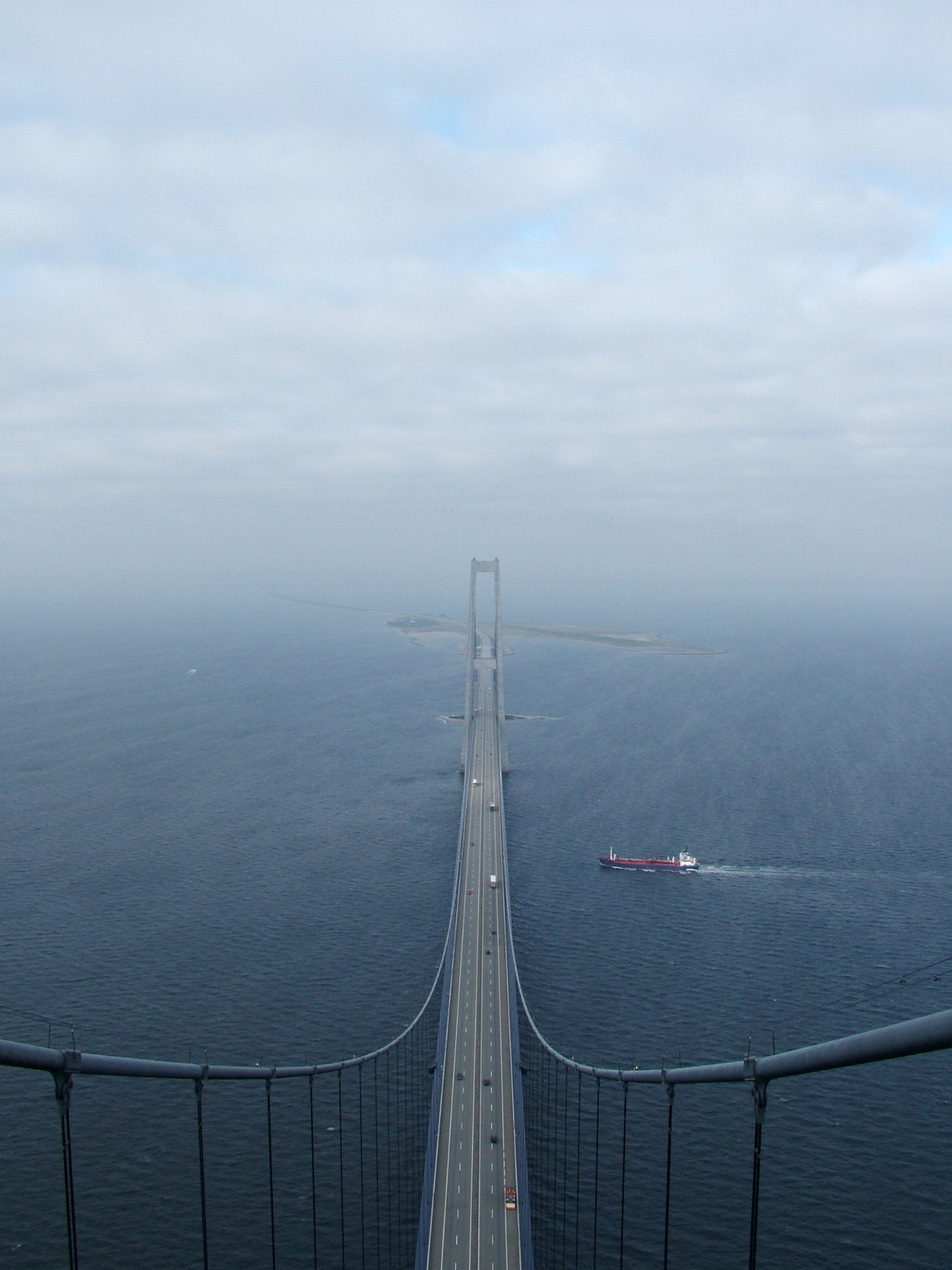
The East Bridge from the top of the eastern pylon

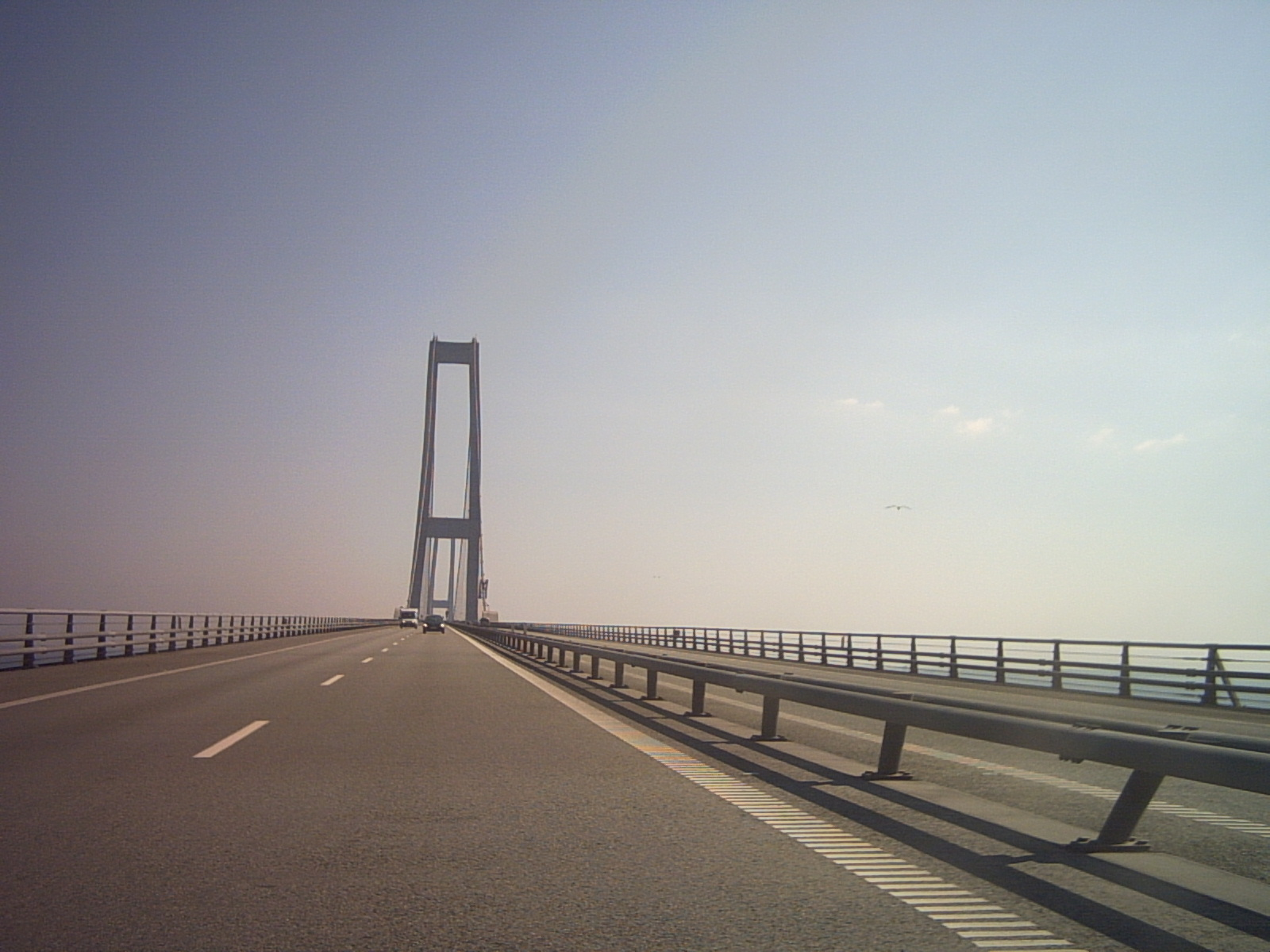
The East Bridge on a clear day

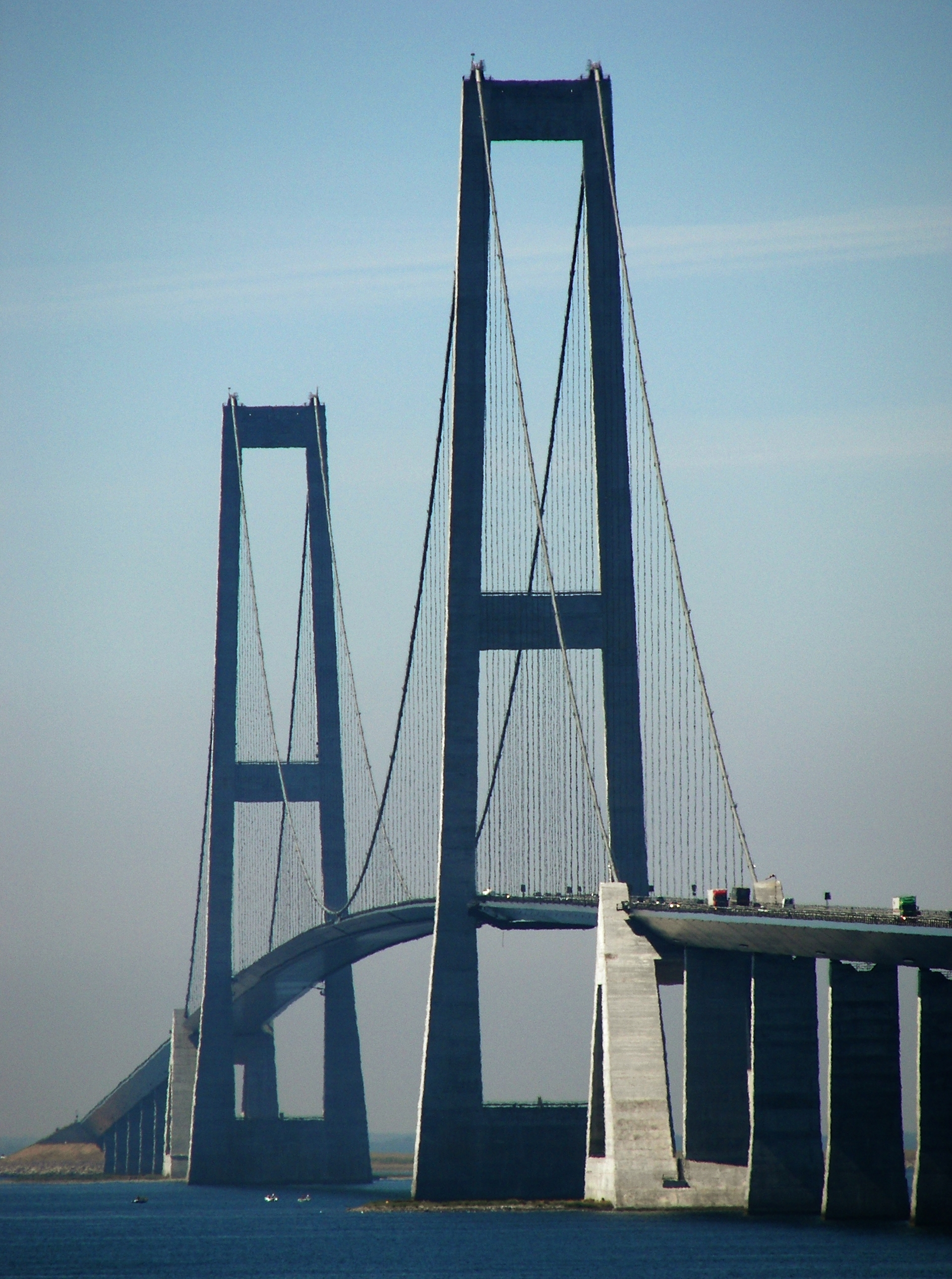
A closeup of the two pylons

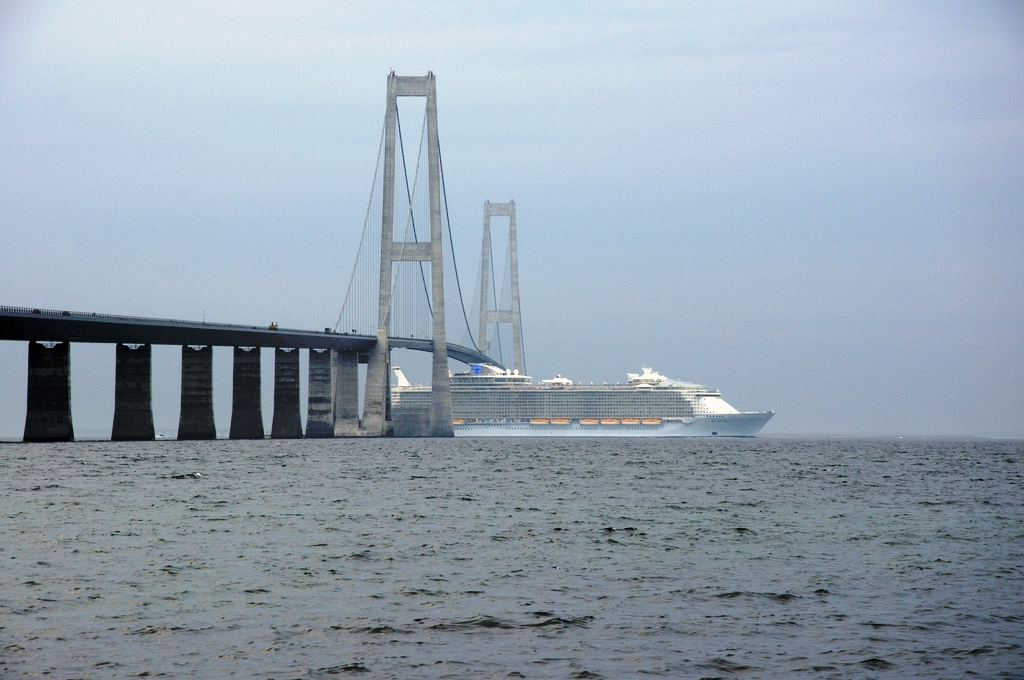
Allure of the Seas passing under the East Bridge

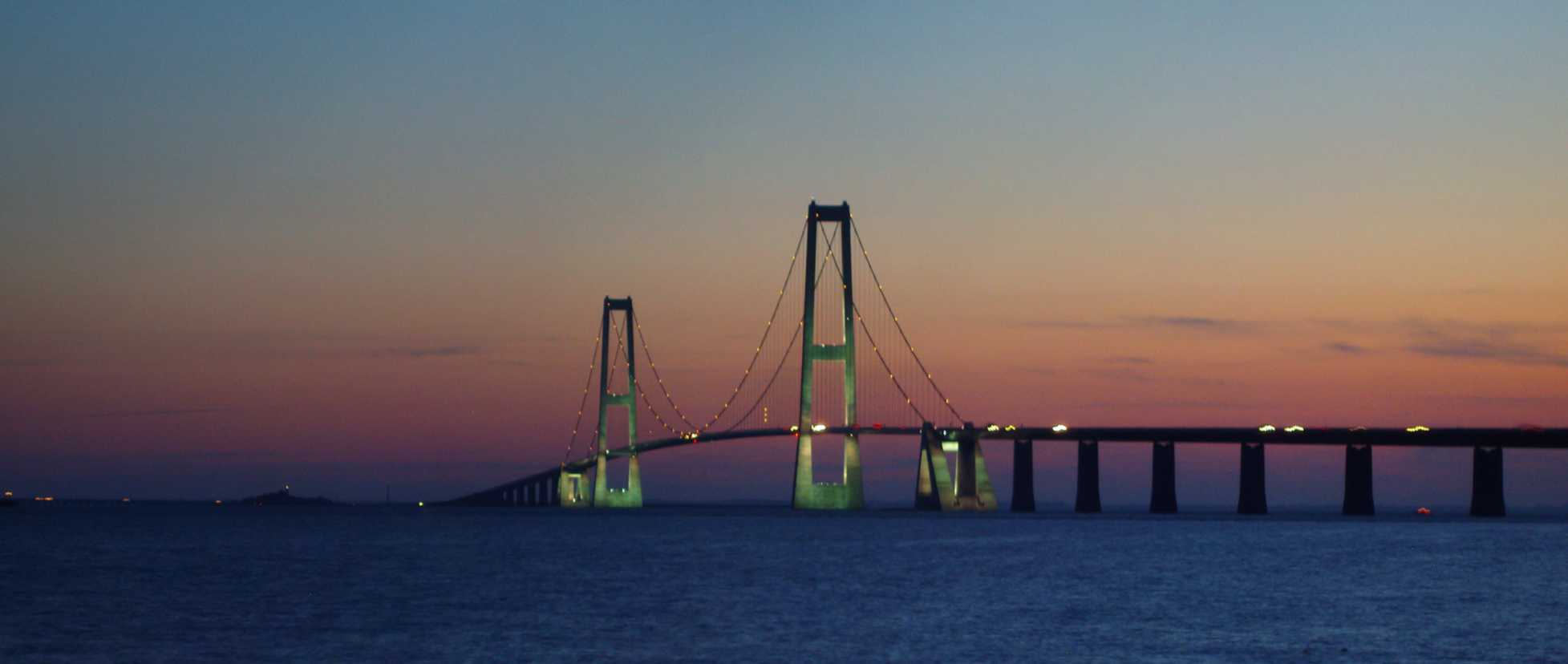
The East Bridge at sunset

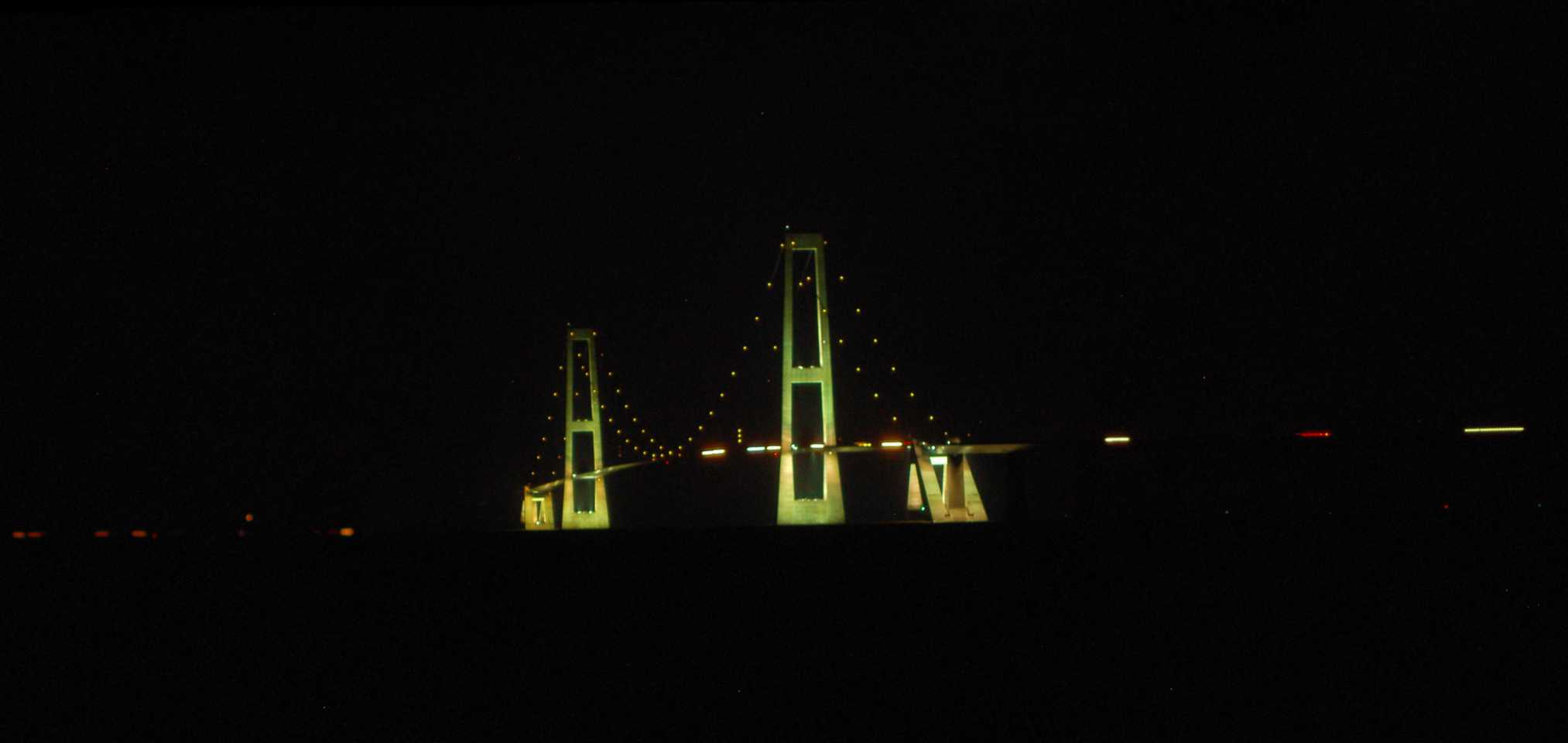
The East Bridge at night

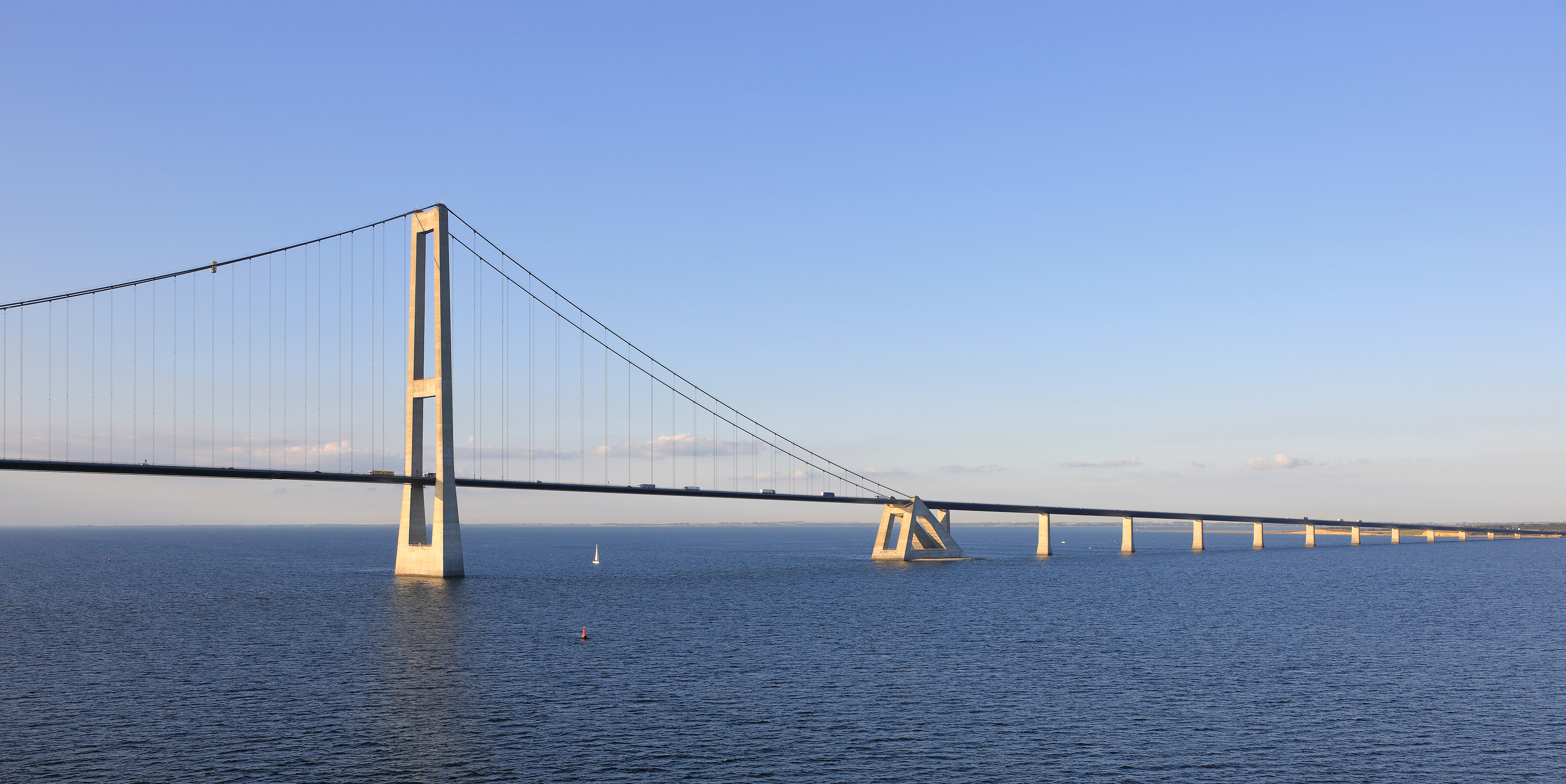
The East Bridge at sunset seen from a ship

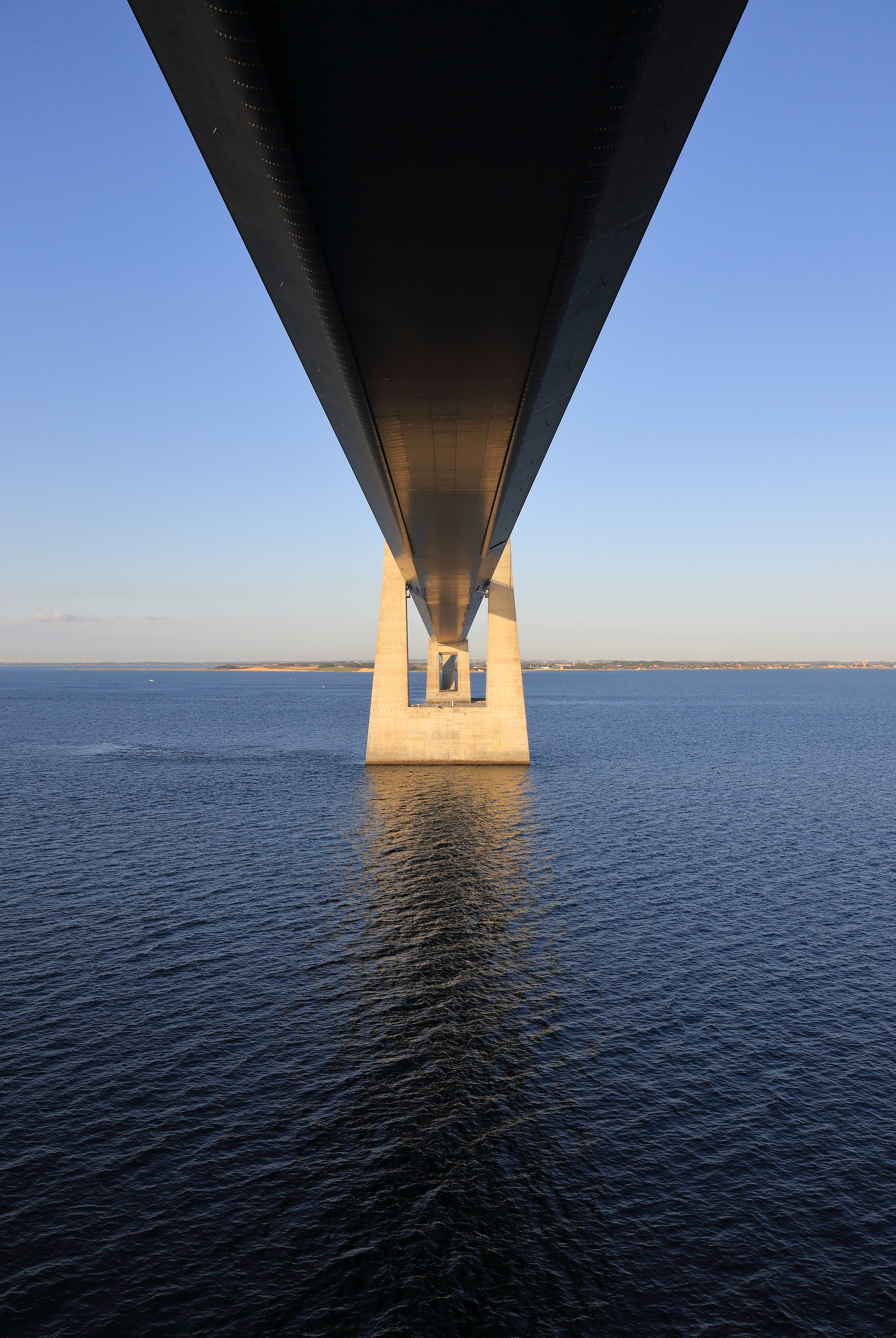
Passing under the East Bridge

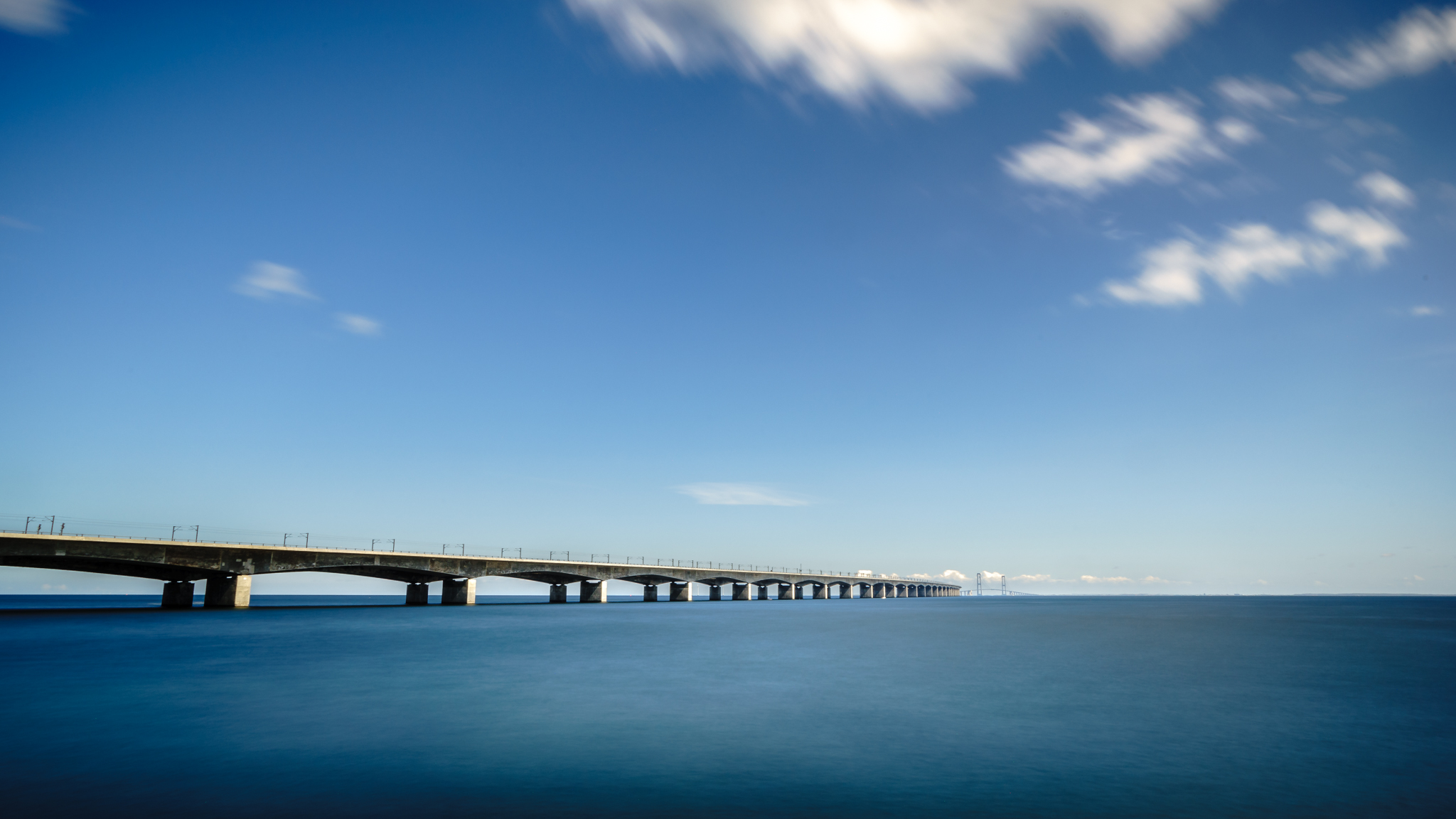
West bridge

== See also ==
- Fehmarn Belt fixed link
- Great Belt power link
- Little Belt
- Øresund Bridge
- List of road-rail bridges
- List of tallest structures in Denmark
