= Taynikma =

Taynikma is a Danish book series. The idea and concept were developed by Merlin P. Mann and Jan Kjær.

The series consists of sixteen volumes, each of which ends with a four-page drawing school. The first volume came out in October 2005; the last, in 2012. The series' publisher was Phabel.

The series was also released in Norway, Sweden, Finland, Iceland, Russia, and the United Kingdom (first 4 books). The books won the Orla Award in 2007 as the year's best comics in Denmark. In 2010, it won the Taynikma Drawing School by Jan Kjær Orla Prize.

The authors have since started a new Taynikma-book/series.

== The series' titles ==
- Book 1: Master Thief
- Book 2: The Rats
- Book 3: Tower Of The Sun
- Book 4: The Lost Catacombs
- Book 5: The Secret Arena
- Book 6: The Battle of Clans
- Book 7: Henzel's Trap
- Book 8: The Forest of Shadows
- Book 9: The Fortress of Light
- Book 10: The Last Battle
- Book 11: Skyggebæsterne (The Shadow Beasts)
- Book 12: Teneborea
- Book 13: Sarinas mareridt (Sarina's Nightmare)
- Book 14: Den skjulte fjende (The Hidden Enemy)
- Book 15: Artans valg (Artan's Choice)
- Book 16: Skyggekongen (The Shadow King)
