= MV Karen Danielsen =

The M/V Karen Danielsen, is a multipurpose container feeder, built in March 1985 by J.J. Sietas KG, at their shipbuilding yard in Hamburg-Neuenfelde, Germany, and labelled a type 111a. This ship is registered as the 970 new-build ship by J.J. Sietas KG.

Chartered 1987 by Herbert Drewes under the name Esperanza. Sold 1988 and renamed to Mánafoss and registered in Antigua. In 1992 it returned to Herbert Drewes and was again renamed to Esperanza and sailed under A German flag.

The ship was bought by the Danish shipping company Otto Danielsen (located in Virum, Denmark) on 30 December 2002 and was renamed M/V Karen Danielsen, and re-registered under the Bahamas flag.

== Great Belt Bridge accident ==
M/V Karen Danielsen crashed into the Danish Great Belt Bridge on 3 March 2005 during a trip from Svendborg to Finland, and is currently out of service.

The crash knocked two cranes off the ship, and destroyed the top deck of the ship's bridge. A fire also broke out on board. The chief officer was at the helm, and was killed in the crash. His body was discovered in the hold. An autopsy revealed that he had a blood alcohol concentration of at least 1.55 parts per 1000. Several of the other crew members, all of whom were from Croatia, were badly injured, including the captain.

The bridge received no structural damage and was able to reopen several hours later.
