= Slots Bjergby =

- Town
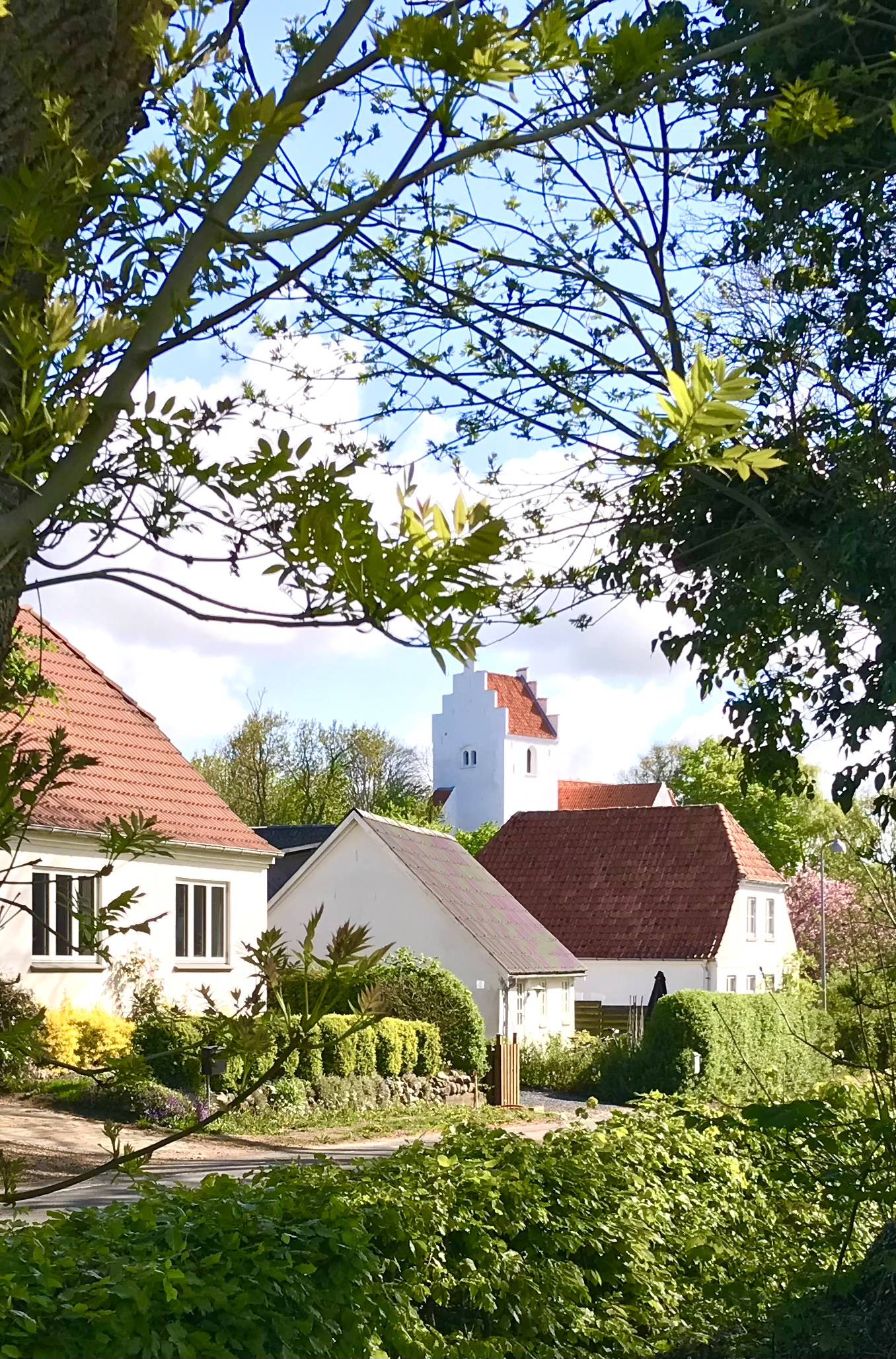
- Slots Bjergby 12. May 2022

- Location in Region Zealand Slots Bjergby (Denmark)
- Coordinates: 55°22′23″N 11°20′3″E
- Country: Denmark
- Region: Region Zealand
- Municipality: Slagelse

Area
  - Urban: 0.6 km^{2} (0.23 sq mi)

Population (2026)
  - Urban: 1,026
  - Urban density: 1,700/km^{2} (4,400/sq mi)
- Time zone: UTC+1 (CET)
  - Summer (DST): UTC+2 (CEST)
- Postal code: DK-4200 Slagelse

Slots Bjergby is a small town in Zealand, Denmark. It is located in Slagelse Municipality.

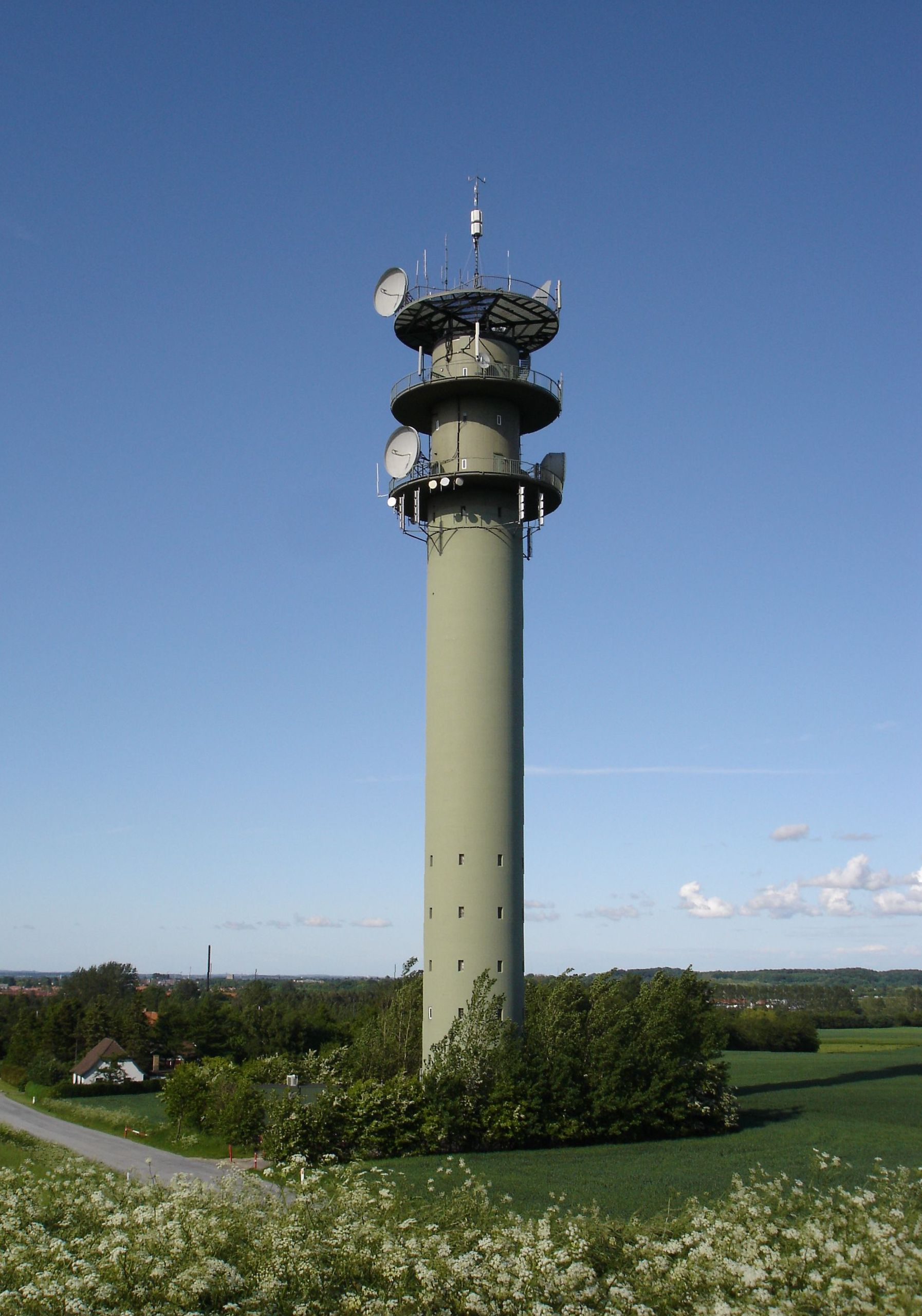
The telecommunication tower in Slots Bjergby

== Slots Bjergby Church ==
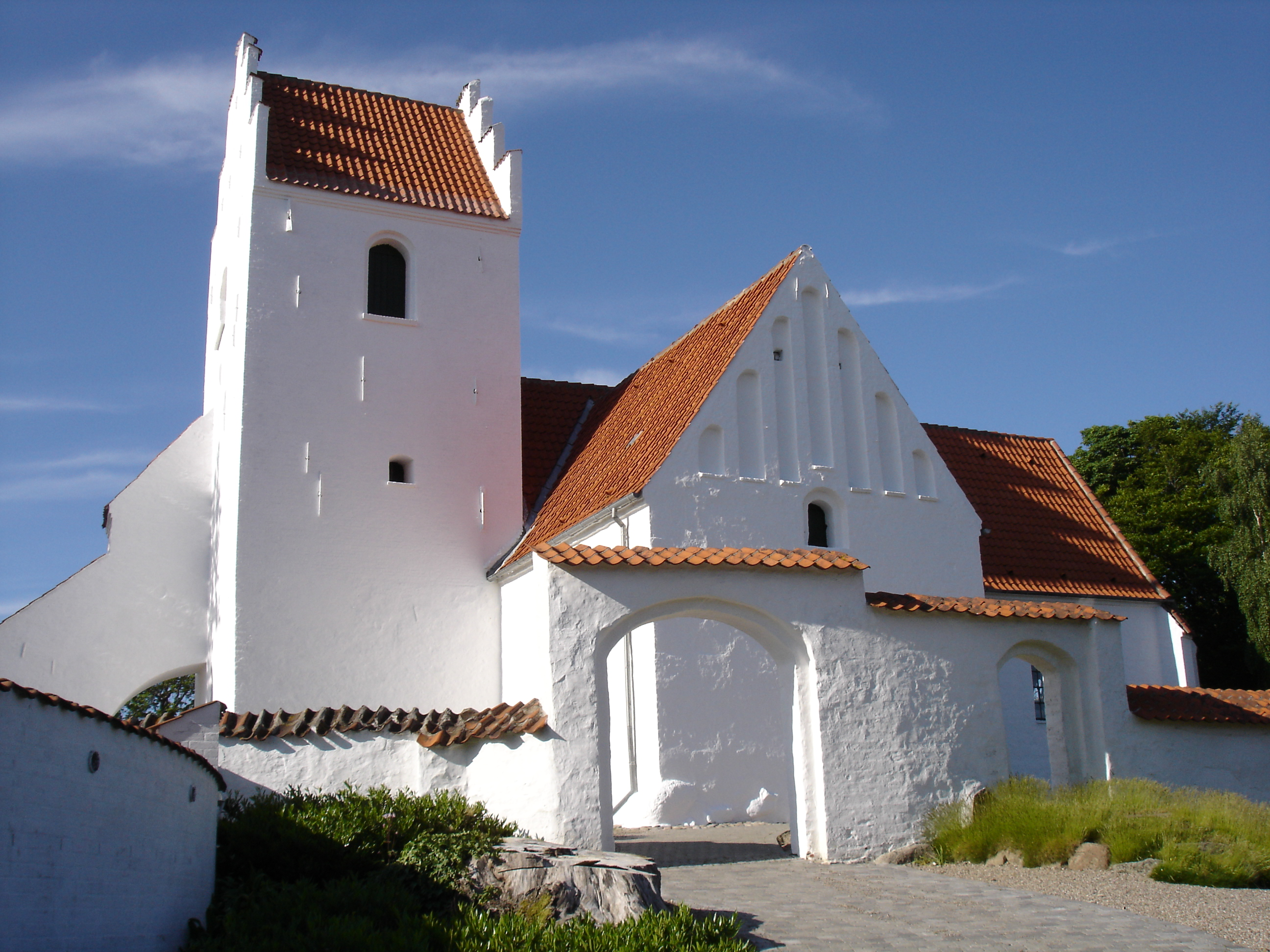
Slots Bjergby Church

Slots Bjergby Church is built between 1050 and 1275. The oldest parts of the church are the nave and choir. Later extensions include sacristy, tower and church porch. The altarpiece is from 1742, made by carpenter Oluf Jacobsen. The pulpit is also made by Oluf Jacobsen. It was made in 1744. The chalice is from 1673.

== Notable residents ==
- Ludvig Fenger (1833–1905), architect and proponent of the Historicist style
