= Agersø =

Island in Denmark

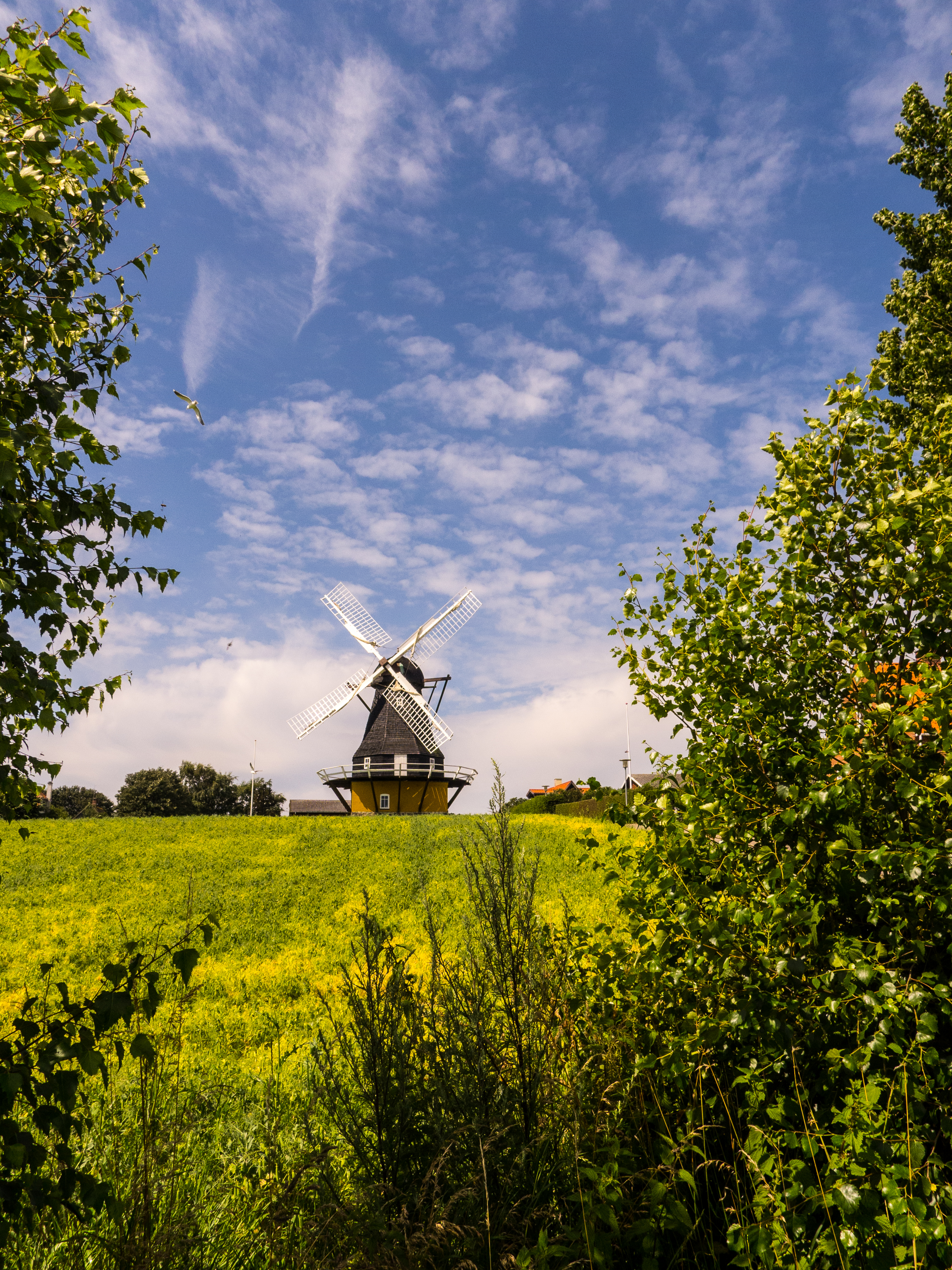
- Agersø Mølle, standing on a small hill near the harbour

- Location within Denmark

Geography
- Location: Great Belt
- Coordinates: 55°12′N 11°12′E
- Area: 6.84 km^{2} (2.64 sq mi)

Administration
- Denmark
- Region: Region Zealand
- Municipality: Slagelse Municipality

Demographics
- Population: 195 (2024)
- Pop. density: 28.51/km^{2} (73.84/sq mi)

Agersø is a Danish island in the Great Belt close to Zealand. The island covers an area of 6.84 km^{2} and has 195 inhabitants (2024).

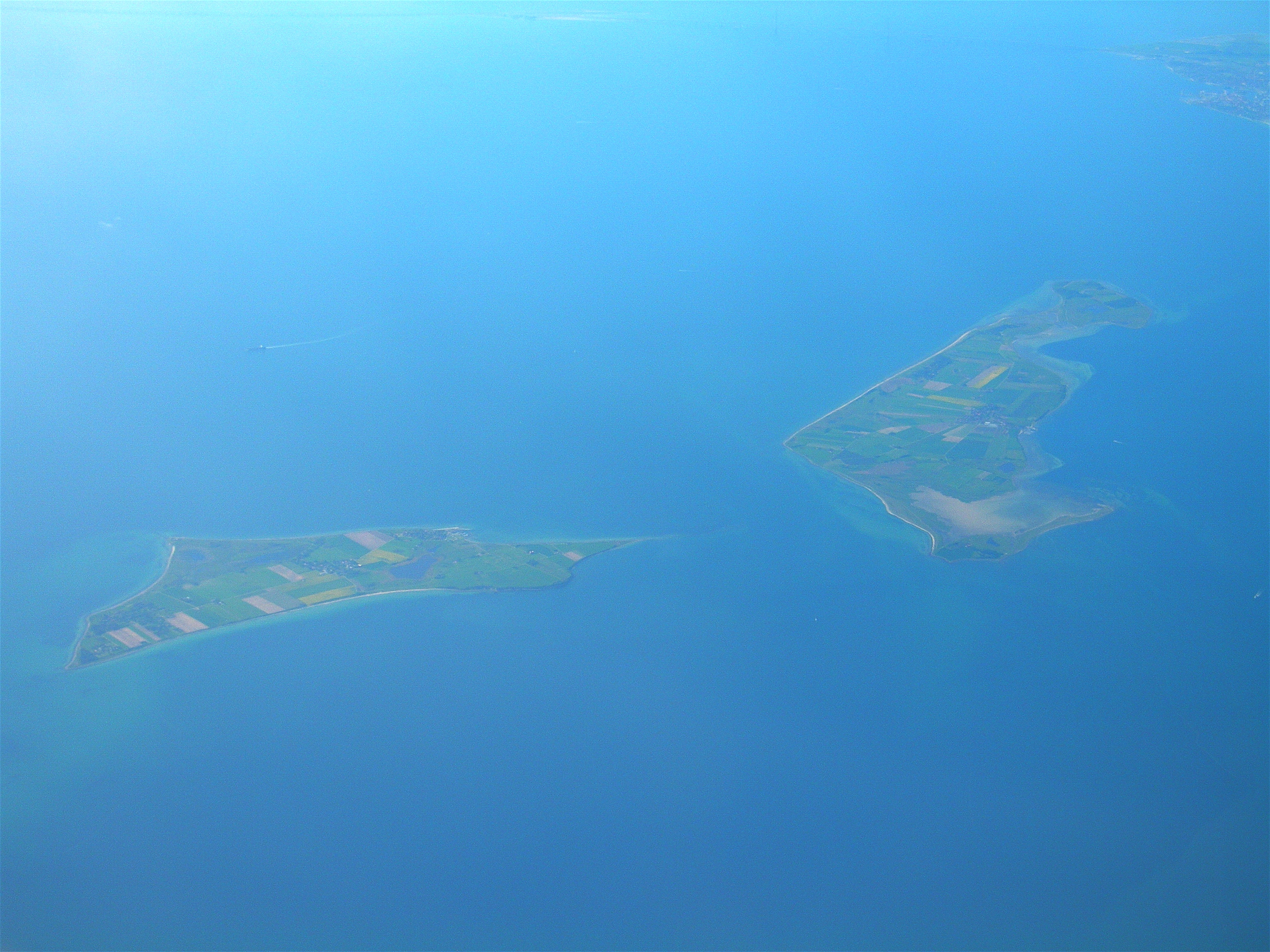
Omø (left) & Agersø (right), with, further away, the Zealand mainland

== See also ==
- List of Danish islands
- Sydhavsøerne
