= Omø =

Omø Island
- Island
- Omø island (lower center) is south of Slagelse, west of Næstved on Zealand.
- Coordinates: 55°9′0″N 11°10′0″E
- Country: Denmark
- State: Region Sjælland
- Municipality: Slagelse municipality

Area
  - Total: 4.52 km^{2} (1.75 sq mi)

Population (2005)
  - Total: 168
  - Density: 37.2/km^{2} (96.3/sq mi)
- Time zone: UTC+1 (CET)
  - Summer (DST): UTC+2 (CEST)
- Postal codes

Omø is a Danish island in the Great Belt. The island covers an area of 4.52 km^{2} (1.75 sq mi), with a 12-kilometre (7-mile) coastline, and has 168 inhabitants, of which the majority inhabit Omø village, which has a church, and Kirkehavn, a small harbour with a ferry boat berth, along with a newly built marina, made for the purpose of promoting fishery, which, along with agriculture, conforms the island's main economic activity. Some of the island's natural features are its lake and its bog; also, it is characterized for its varied bird life.

Omø maintains a lighthouse and cabins, along with a campsite, in order to invite tourism.

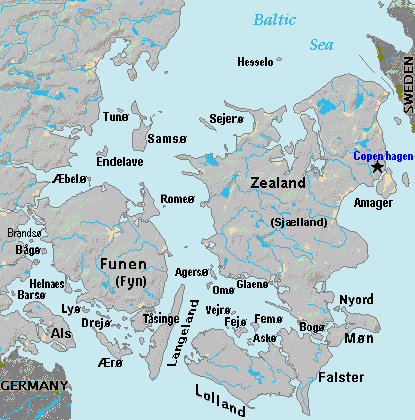
Omø island (lower center) is north of Lolland island, southwest of Zealand and south of Agersø island.

== See also ==
- Nearby islands: Zealand, Agersø, Glaenø, Vejrø, Fejø, Femø, Lolland.
- Nearby cities: Korsør, Skælskør, Slagelse, Næstved.
