= Great Belt =

Strait in Denmark linking the Baltic Sea to the Kattegat strait and the Atlantic Ocean

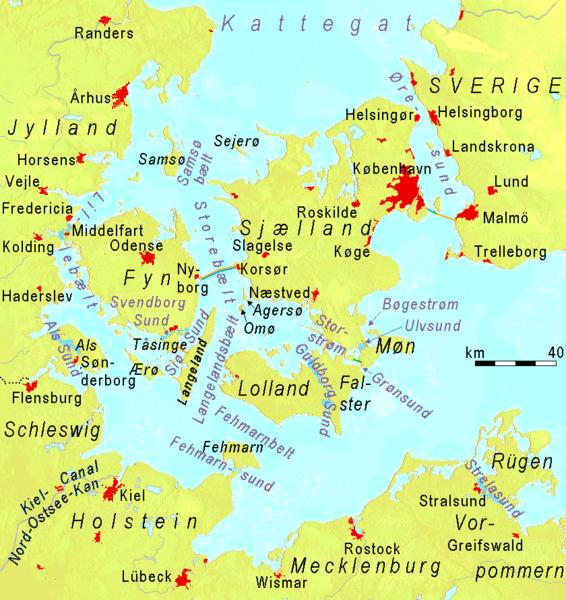
- Straits of Denmark and southwestern Baltic Sea. The Great Belt (labelled with its Danish name Storebælt) is slightly left of center

- Location within Europe
- Coordinates: 55.333°N 11.000°E
- Type: strait
- Basin countries: Denmark
- Max. length: 60 km (37 mi)
- Max. width: 32 km (20 mi)
- Min. width: 16 km (10 mi)
- Max. depth: 60 m (197 ft)
- Islands: Samsø in the north and Langeland to the south

The Great Belt (Danish: Storebælt, pronounced [ˈstoːɐˌpelˀt]) is a strait between the major islands of Zealand (Sjælland) and Funen (Fyn) in Denmark. It is one of the three Danish Straits.

Effectively dividing Denmark in two, the Belt was served by the Great Belt ferries from the late 19th century until the islands were connected by the Great Belt Fixed Link in 1997–98.

== Geography ==
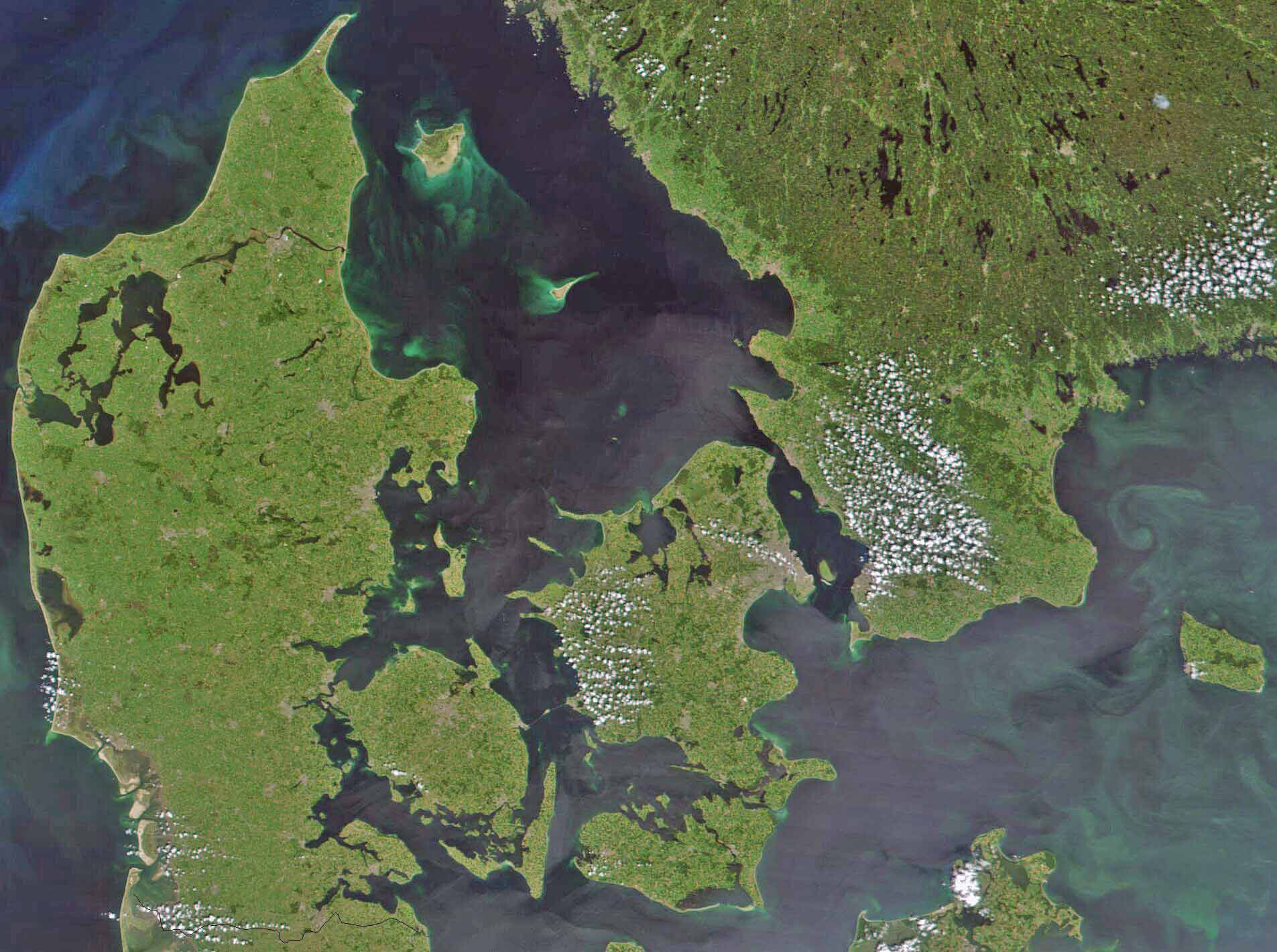
Satellite view over Denmark: The Great Belt is the passage in the center.

The Great Belt is the largest and most important of the three Danish Straits that connect the Baltic Sea to the Kattegat strait and Atlantic Ocean. The others are the Øresund and the Little Belt straits.

The Great Belt is 60 km (37 miles) long and 16–32 km (10–20 miles) wide. It flows around two major islands: Samsø in the north and Langeland to the south. At Sprogø the Great Belt divides into the East Channel and the West Channel. Both are traversed by the Great Belt Fixed Link, but a tunnel also runs under the East Channel.

== Geology ==
In pre-glacial times a river, which the Baltic Sea basin then contained and which geologists call the Eridanos, must have passed near the region as the rise of South Swedish Dome in Neogene times diverted it south from its previous path across central Sweden.

The Great Belt originated as Dana River that was eroded into existence 9000–8900 years ago when post-glacial rebound made the Ancylus Lake that occupied the Baltic depression lose its outlets around Gothenburg tipping over in the south. The forming of the Dana River is thought to have caused a dramatic erosion of sediments, peatlands and forests along its way. This led initially to a relatively rapid fall in the lake level over hundreds of years to then continue falling at a lower pace. Rising sea levels allowed the sea to break through the Dana River forming the Great Belt as a proper seaway. In the processes the Ancylus Lake became the Littorina Sea as salt water entered the Baltic depression.

== Biology ==
The Great Belt is home to some popular fish: flatfish, sea trout, Atlantic cod, Atlantic mackerel and garfish, which are fished avidly for sport and for sale. A large and rising population of harbour porpoises lives in the Belts.

== International waterway ==
The Great Belt was historically navigable to ocean-going vessels. It still is used, despite a few collisions and near collisions with the Great Belt Bridge. The Danish navy monitors maritime traffic in the waters around the Great Belt.

In the reign of king Eric of Pomerania the Danish government began to receive a large part of its income from the Sound Dues, a toll on international merchant ships passing through the Øresund. Non-Danish vessels were restricted to the Øresund channel. Merchants paid the tax under threat of having their vessels sunk or confiscated.

During the middle of the 19th century, this practice became a diplomatic liability and the Danish government agreed to terminate it, achieving an international financial compensation in return. Danish waterways were consequently opened to foreign shipping. The eastern half of the Great Belt is an international waterway, legally based on the 1857 Copenhagen Convention. The western half of the Great Belt (between Funen and Sprogø) and all other parts of the Danish Straits are Danish territorial waters and subject to Danish jurisdiction.

In 1991, Finland instituted proceedings before the International Court of Justice against Denmark, which was planning to build a fixed traffic connection over the Great Belt (later Great Belt Fixed Link), including a bridge that Finland alleged would prevent the passage of certain ships to and from Finland: Finnish-built mobile offshore drilling units would be unable to pass beneath the bridge. The case was discontinued in 1992, before the Court had to rule on the merits, because Finland and Denmark reached a negotiated settlement. The two countries negotiated a financial compensation of 90 million Danish kroner, and Finland withdrew the lawsuit.

On 4 April 2024, the Danish Maritime Authority ordered the closure of an area of the strait south-west of Korsør to shipping and aviation after a missile launcher aboard HDMS Niels Juel malfunctioned during a naval exercise.

== See also ==
- Great Belt Bridge
- Great Belt Power Link — electrical power cable.
- Danish Straits — includes Great Belt.
  - Little Belt — strait between Jutland and Funen.
  - Øresund — strait between Zealand and Sweden.
- March across the Belts
