= Didrik Frisch =

Danish painter

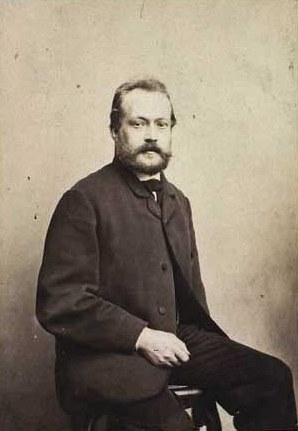
Didrik Frisch (1850s)

Johan Didrik Frisch (4 May 1835 – 22 November 1867) was a Danish landscape and animal painter.

== Biography ==
Didrik Frisch was born on a farm near Slagelse, Denmark. His father was a landowner. He began his education at the Sorø Academy; a private boarding school. While there, perhaps inspired by Frederik Vermehren, who was a family friend, he started doing sketches. These drew the attention of the landscape painter Hans Harder, who was sufficiently impressed that he helped him to begin his career as an artist.

After some time at the Royal Danish Academy of Fine Arts, he went to Paris in 1857 to continue his studies. While there, he began to show his paintings. Originally, he depicted figures, but soon turned to landscapes, then combined the two.

By 1866, however, he had decided to devote himself to animal painting and spent a great deal of time painting en plein aire at the Jægersborg Dyrehave (Deer Park). The following year, he received a scholarship from the Academy to study in Italy. He briefly visited Rome, then went to Florence, where he took up with his fellow Danish painters, Otto Bache and L.A. Schou.

During a cholera epidemic later that year, he and Schou were both infected and died in Florence within days of each other.
