= Slagelse =

- City
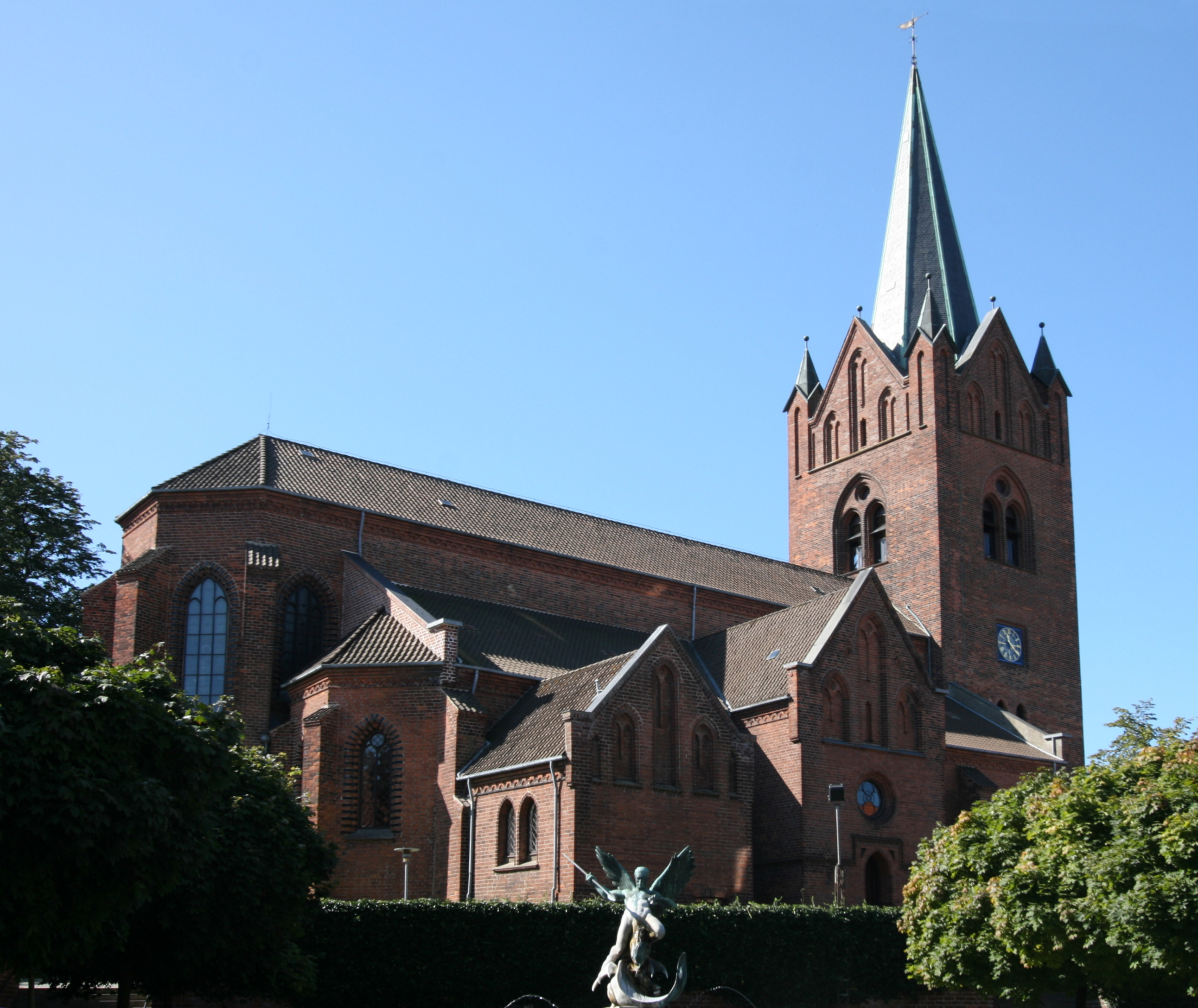
- Church of Saint Michael

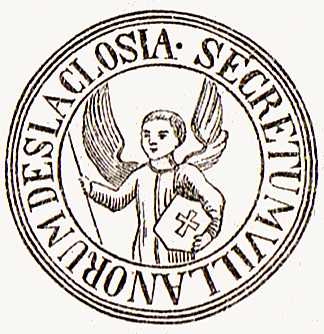
- Seal Coat of arms

- Location in Denmark Slagelse (Denmark Region Zealand)
- Coordinates: 55°24′17.5″N 11°21′11″E
- Country: Denmark
- Region: Region Zealand
- Municipality: Slagelse

Area
  - Urban: 16.6 km^{2} (6.4 sq mi)

Population (2026)
  - Urban: 36,140
  - Urban density: 2,180/km^{2} (5,640/sq mi)
  - Gender: 17,681 males and 18,459 females
- Demonym(s): Slagelsebo, Slagelseaner
- Time zone: UTC+1 (CET)
  - Summer (DST): UTC+2 (CEST)
- Postal code: DK-4200 Slagelse
- Calling code: (+45) 58
- Website: slagelse.dk

Slagelse (Danish pronunciation: [ˈslɛːjl̩sə]) is a town located on the southwestern part of Zealand, Denmark. The town is the seat of Slagelse Municipality, and is the biggest town of the municipality. It is located 15 km east of Korsør, 16 km north-east of Skælskør, 33 km south-east of Kalundborg and 14 km west of Sorø.

== History ==
Slagelse has been inhabited since at least the Viking Age, where it was a Pagan site. Trelleborg, a ring castle, was built near the current location of Slagelse in 980, which made the location strategically important. A church was built at Slagelse's current location in the 1000s. Around this time, coins were minted in Slagelse.

Antvorskov was built in the 1100s by Valdemar I, who had recently acquired Zealand. He built the monastery in an attempt to gain control and favor with the locals. The monastery was used by the Knights Hospitaller.

Slagelse was granted the status of a market town in 1288 by Eric V. This gave the town a series of privileges, though eventually put it in competition with the neighboring market towns of Korsør and Skælskør. In the 1780s a road from Copenhagen to Korsør was built, and this road ran through Slagelse.

== Sights ==
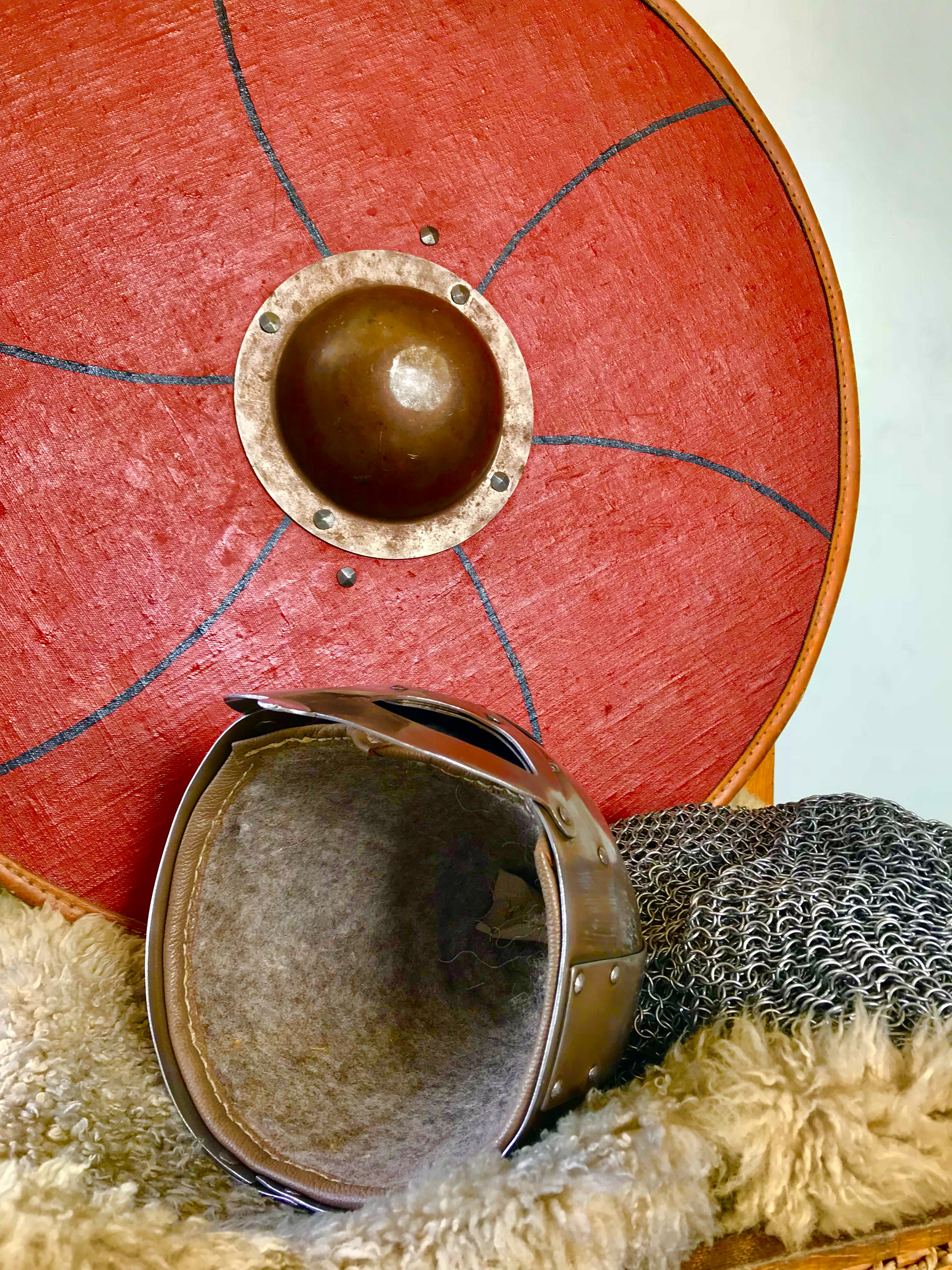
Effects from collection at Trelleborg

=== Trelleborg viking fortress ===
Explore the Viking era site up close at the UNESCO site of the Viking fortress Trelleborg, located near Slagelse in West Zealand County. Built around 980 by King Harald Bluetooth, Trelleborg is a remarkable example of a ring fortress from the Viking Age. The impressive remains of this ancient royal stronghold are still visible in the picturesque Tude ådal landscape.

=== Park ===
Slagelse Park (Danish: Slagelse Lystanlæg) is a park located centrally in Slagelse. It is a green recreational area, with lakes, playgrounds and a maze.

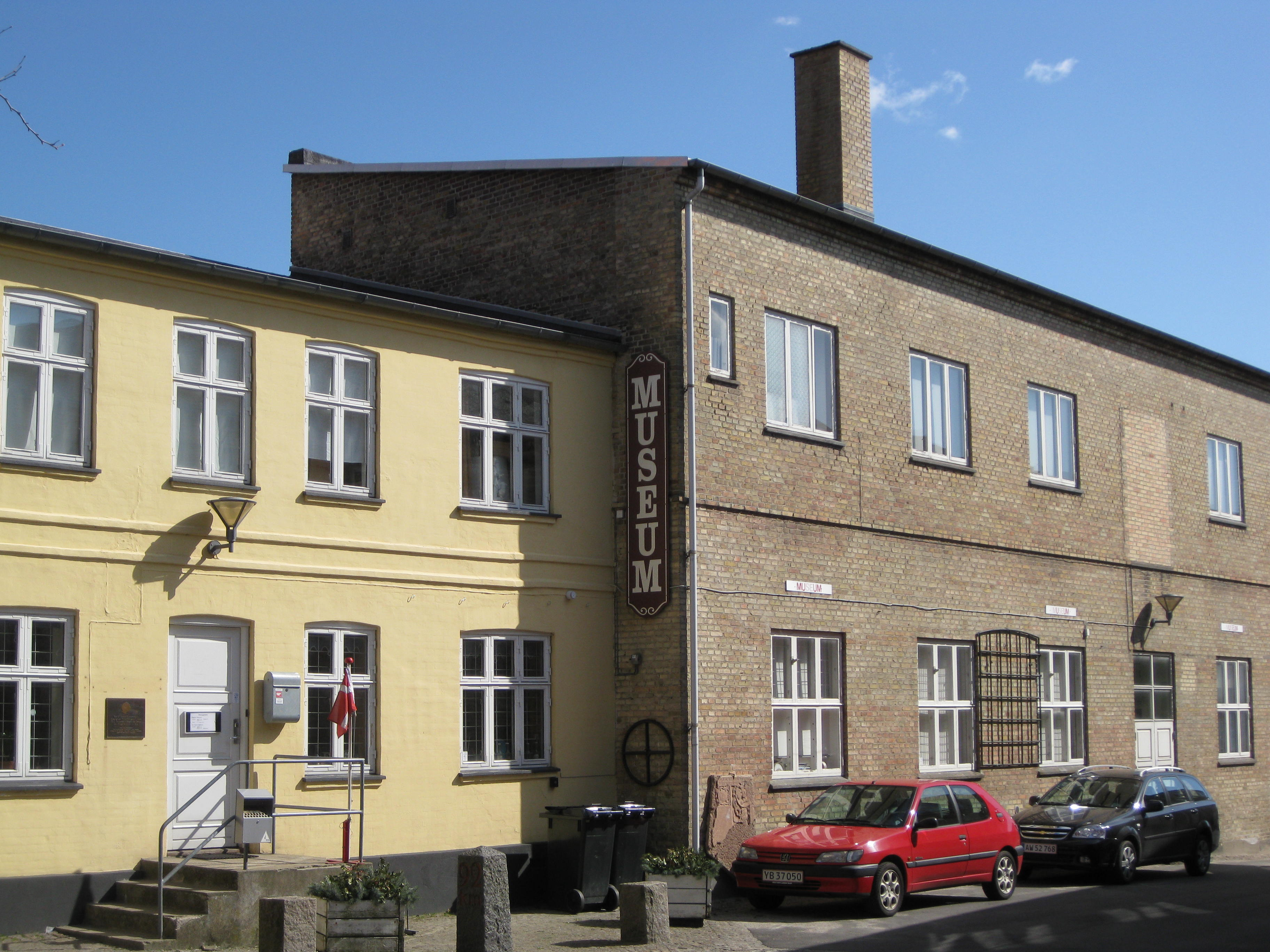
Slagelse Museum

=== Museums ===
- Slagelse Museum is located centrally in Slagelse. The museum focuses mainly on trade and artisanry. It includes a reconstruction of a shop from the 1940–1950s, as well as sections on local history. A part of the museum is dedicated to H. C. Andersen, who went to school in Slagelse.
- Panzermuseum East is located approximately 13 kilometers south of Slagelse, is a Danish military museum that showcases a variety of military vehicles. The museum's main emphasis is on displaying the military equipment of the Warsaw Pact countries which could have potentially been utilized in Denmark during the Cold War. The museum officially opened its doors on 3 May 2014, and is housed in a 4500 m2 building.

=== Antvorskov ===
The Antvorskov Monastery Ruins are located in southern Slagelse. They are the ruins of Antvorskov Monastery, a monastery built in 1164 by Valdemar I. It was the first Knights Hospitaller monastery in Denmark, and was used as monastery until 1536 when the crown took over ownership and turned into a castle. Frederik II used the castle between 1580 and 1584. After that it was used by fief lords until 1717, when it became a ryttergods - a location for the Danish cavalry. It was sold in 1774 and most of the castle was torn down in 1816.

== Schools ==
- SDU Slagelse.
- ZBC Slagelse.
- Professionshøjskolen Absalon.

== Transportation ==
=== Rail ===
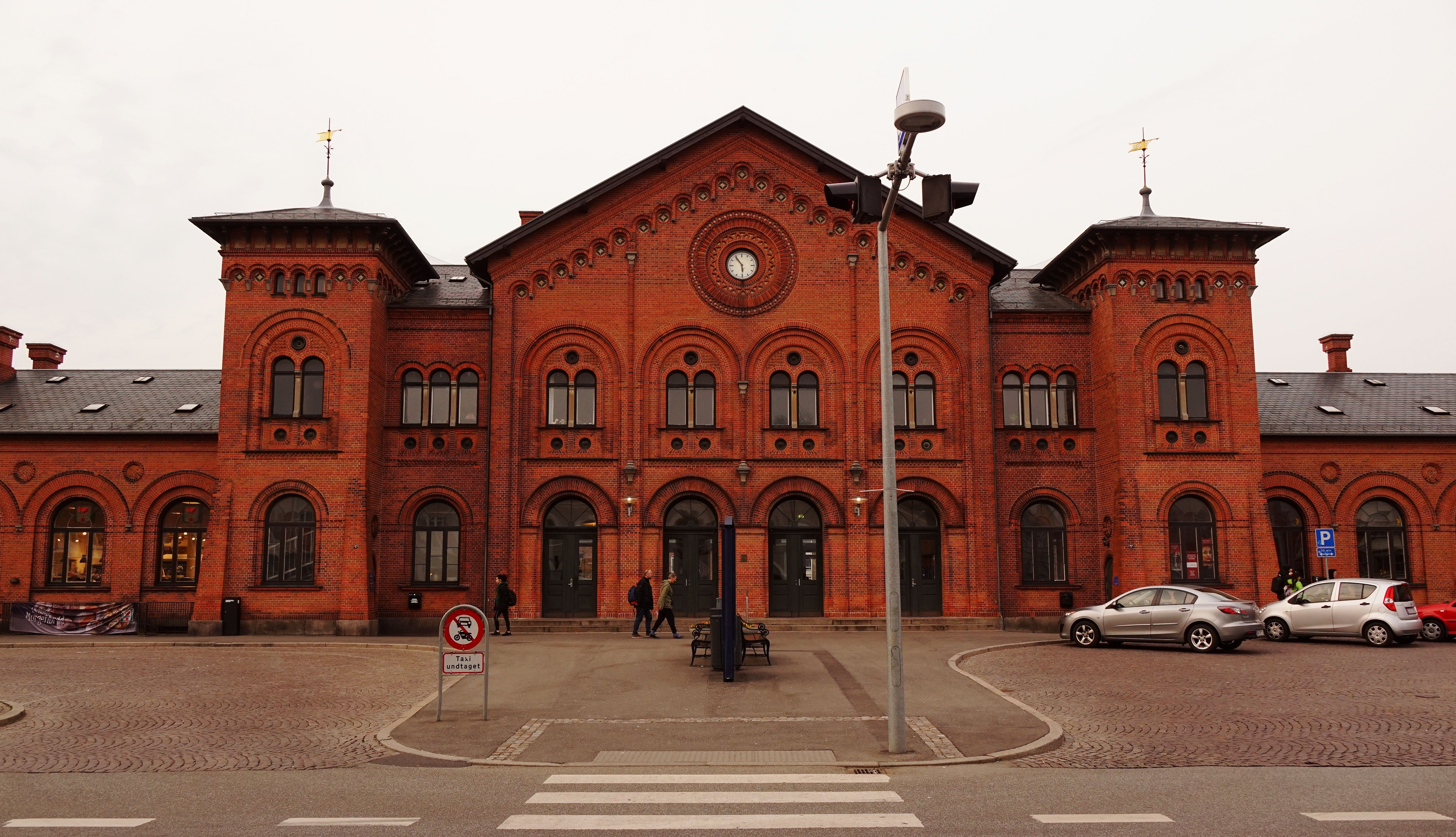
Slagelse railway station.

Slagelse is located on the main line Copenhagen–Fredericia railway from Copenhagen to Funen and Jutland, and the Tølløse Line connects Slagelse with Tølløse on the Northwest Line. Slagelse railway station is the principal railway station of the town, and offers direct InterCity services to Copenhagen, Funen and Jutland, regional train services to Copenhagen and Odense operated by the national railway company DSB and local train services to Tølløse operated by the regional railway company Lokaltog.

== Notable residents ==
=== Public service and politics ===
- Ludvig Stoud Platou (1778–1833), historical and geographical writer
- Georg Koës (1782–1811), philologist
- Jørgen Peter Frederik Wulff (1808–1881), naval officer
- Anna Laursen (1845–1911), schoolteacher and women's rights activist
- Jens Christian Johansen (1868–1929), land improvement engineer and honorary consul general
- Margrethe Nørlund Bohr (1890–1984), editor and transcriber for Danish physicist Niels Bohr
- Hilmar Baunsgaard (1920–1989), politician and leader of the Danish Social Liberal Party from 1968–1975
- Villum Christensen (born 1954), politician and MF
- Kim Christiansen (born 1956), politician and MF
- Stén Knuth (born 1964), politician and MF
- Louise Schack Elholm (born 1977), politician and MF
- Rasmus Horn Langhoff (born 1980), politician and MF

=== Art ===
- Johan Jacob Bruun (1715–1789), painter
- Andrea Krætzmer (1811–1889), ballet dancer
- Didrik Frisch (1835–1867), landscape painter
- Ludvig Abelin Schou (1838–1867), painter
- Hans Egede Budtz (1889–1968), actor
- Ella Ungermann (1891–1921), actress
- Vilhelm Lauritzen (1894–1984), architect and founder of the Vilhelm Lauritzen Architects architectural firm
- Hardy Rafn (1930–1997), actor
- Stig Brøgger (born 1941), artist
- Torben Lendager (born 1951), singer
- Kirsten Siggard (born 1954), singer and 3-time participant of the Eurovision Song Contest
- Karsten Kiilerich (born 1955), director, writer and animator
- Elle Klarskov Jørgensen (born 1958), sculptor
- Simone Egeriis (born 1992), pop singer
- Alex Høgh Andersen (born 1994), actor

=== Science ===
- Erik Eliasen (1922–2008), meteorologist and academic
- Niels Erik Nørlund (1885–1981), mathematician
- William Christopher Zeise (1789–1847), chemist

=== Sport ===
- Fred K. Nielsen (1879–1963), college football coach
- Hans Olsen (fencer) (1886–1976), fencer
- Poul Toft Jensen (1912–2000), football player
- Gunner Olesen (1916–1979), gymnast
- Villy Moll Nielsen (1927), field hockey player
- Poul Moll Nielsen (1930–1992), field hockey player
- Torben Alstrup Jensen (1930–2007), field hockey player
- Willy Kristoffersen (born 1933), field hockey player
- Ernst Pedersen (born 1935), former sports shooter
- Vagn Bangsborg (born 1936), former cyclist
- Ole Ritter (born 1941), former cyclist
- Bo Braastrup Andersen (born 1976), football manager and former goalkeeper
- Martin Kristjansen (born 1977), boxer
- Joachim Persson (born 1983), badminton player
- Buster Juul (born 1993), handball player
- Niklas Larsen (born 1997), cyclist
