= Kirke Eskilstrup =

- Town
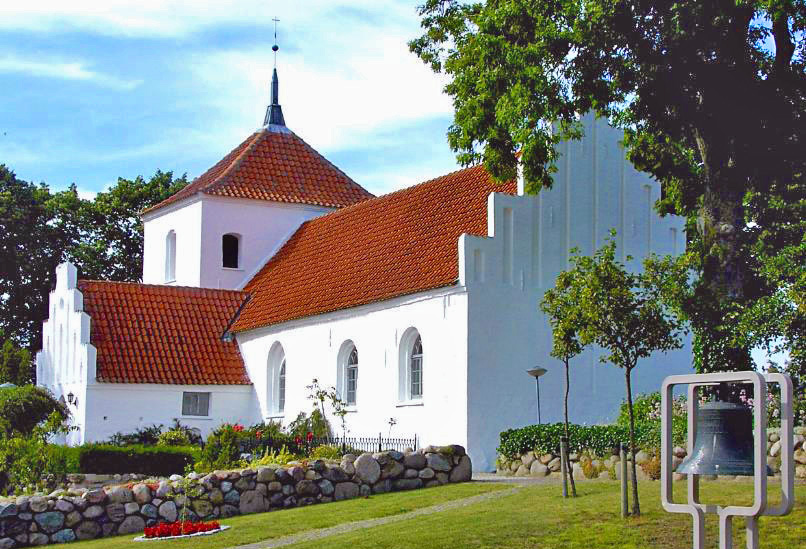
- Kirke Eskilstrup Church

- Location in Region Zealand Kirke Eskilstrup (Denmark)
- Coordinates: 55°34′23″N 11°45′54″E
- Country: Denmark
- Region: Zealand Region
- Municipality: Holbæk Municipality

Population (2026)
  - Urban: 638
- Time zone: UTC+1 (CET)
  - Summer (DST): UTC+2 (CEST)
- Postal code: DK-4360 Kirke Eskilstrup

Kirke Eskilstrup is a small railway town in Holbæk Municipality in Region Zealand, Denmark. As of 1 January 2026 it has a population of 638. It is located about 18 km south of Holbæk and about 20 km north of Ringsted.

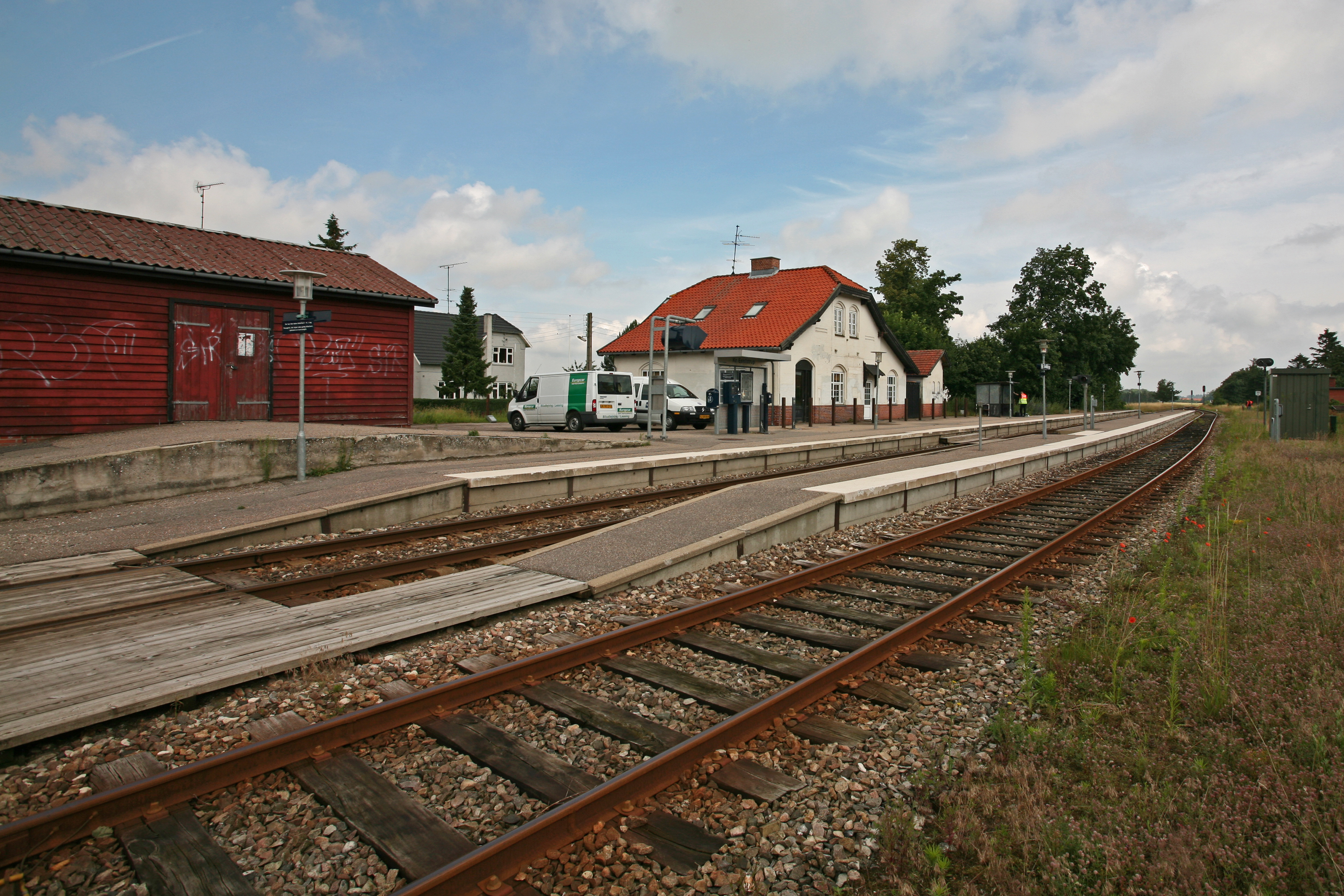
Kirke Eskilstrup railway station

Kirke Eskilstrup is served by Kirke Eskilstrup railway station located on the Tølløse Line between Tølløse and Slagelse.
