= Tølløse Line =

Railway line in Zealand, Denmark

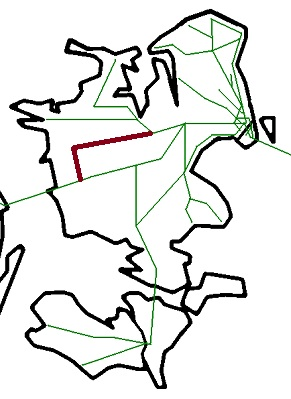

Overview
- Native name: Tølløsebanen
- Status: Active
- Termini: Tølløse station; Slagelse station
- Stations: 12

Service
- Type: Local railway
- System: Danish railways
- Operator(s): Lokaltog

History
- Opened: Tølløse-Høng: 22 December 1901; Slagelse-Høng: 1 May 1898

Technical
- Line length: 50.8 km (31.6 mi)
- Number of tracks: Single track
- Character: Passenger train
- Track gauge: 1,435 mm (4 ft 8 1/2 in)
- Electrification: No
- Operating speed: 120 km/h (75 mph)

The Tølløse Line (Danish: Tølløsebanen) (previously Høng-Tølløse Jernbane (HTJ) is a 50.8 km (31.6 mi) long standard gauge single track local passenger railway line between Tølløse and Slagelse in the western part of the island of Zealand, Denmark. It runs from Tølløse station on the Northwest Line to Slagelse station on the Copenhagen–Fredericia/Taulov Line, through a mainly rural area.

The section from Tølløse to Høng opened in 1901, whereas the section from Høng to Slagelse opened in 1898 as part of the now closed Slagelse-Værslev Line. The railway is currently operated by the railway company Lokaltog. Lokaltog runs frequent local train services from Tølløse station to Slagelse station.

== History ==
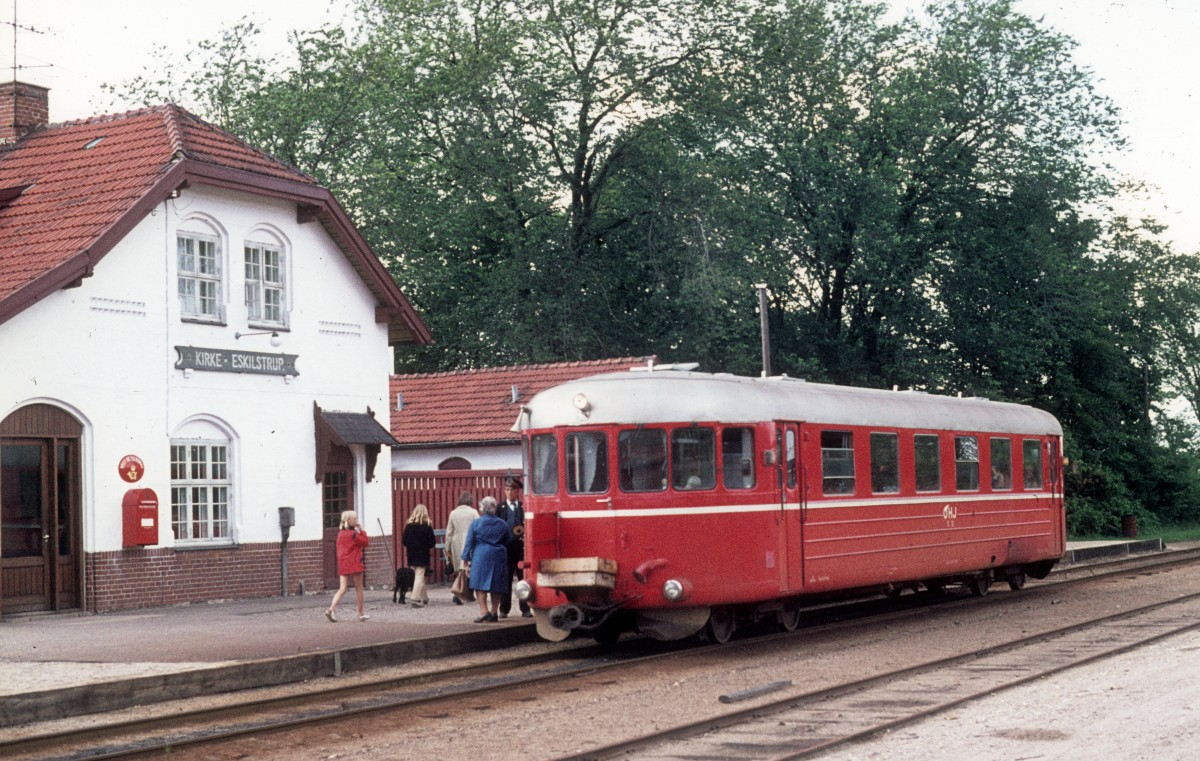
Railcar on the Tølløse Line at Kirke Eskilstrup station in 1974.

The railway line from Tølløse to Høng opened on 22 December 1901 as the Høng-Tølløse Jernbane (HTJ) and connected Tølløse station on the Northwest Line with Høng station on the Slagelse-Værslev Line.

The section from Høng to Slagelse opened on 1 May 1898 as part of the Slagelse-Værslev Line. The section from Høng to Værslev of the Slagelse-Værslev Line was closed on 23 May 1971.

In May 2003, the operating company Høng-Tølløse Jernbane A/S (HTJ) was merged with the operating company of the Odsherred Line, Odsherreds Jernbane A/S, to form the railway company Vestjællands Lokalbaner (VL). On 1 January 2009, Vestsjællands Lokalbaner was again merged with the operating companies of the East Line and the Lolland Line to form the railway company Regionstog A/S (RT) responsible for train operation on four local railways on the islands of Zealand, Lolland and Falster. Regionstog A/S again merged with Lokalbanen A/S on 1 July 2015 to form the railway company Lokaltog A/S which is currently responsible for train operation and related passenger services on the Tølløse Line.

== Operations ==
Trains on the Tølløse Line are operated by the railway company Lokaltog. Lokaltog runs frequent local train services from Tølløse station to Slagelse station.

== Stations ==
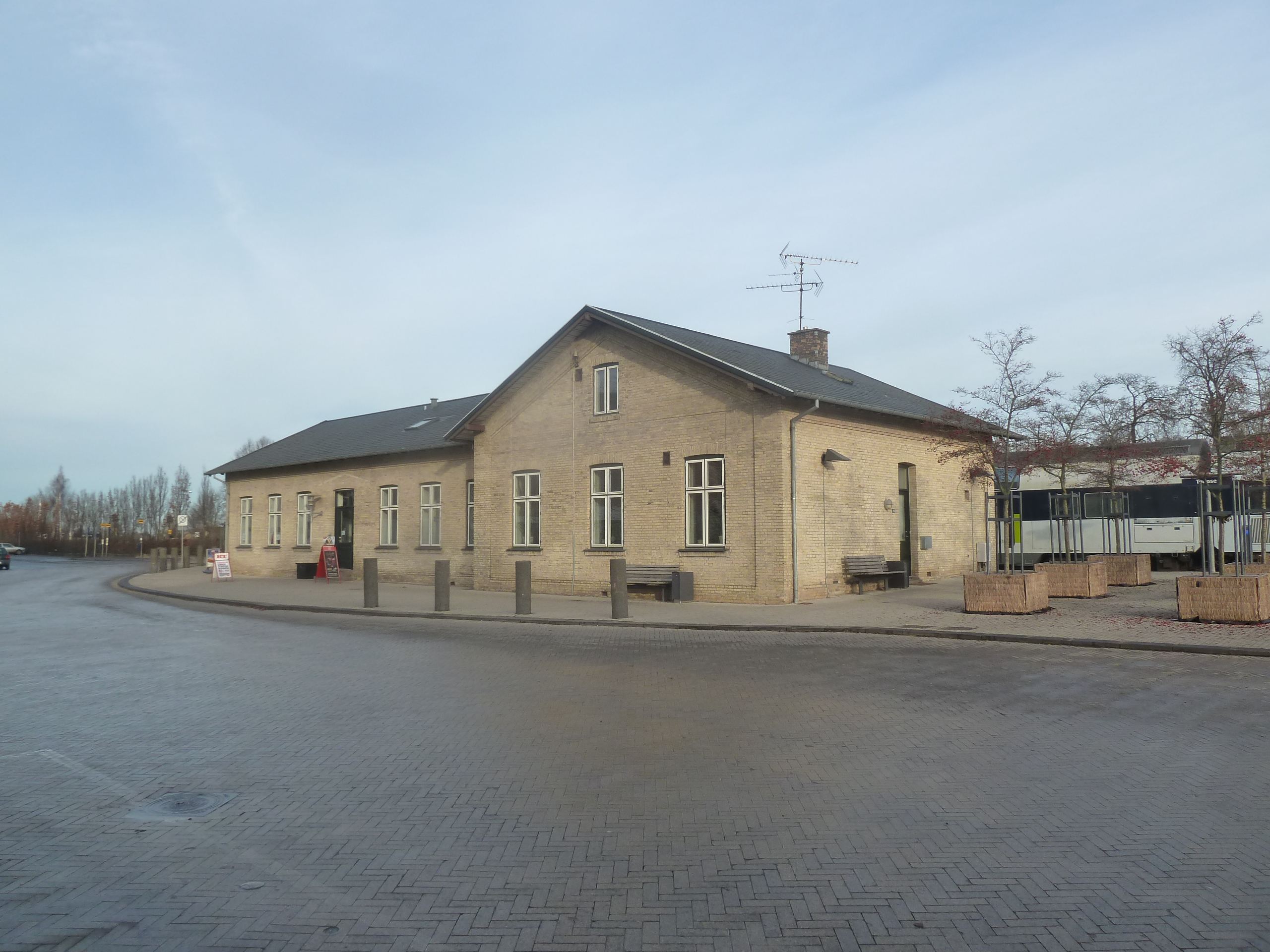
Tølløse station

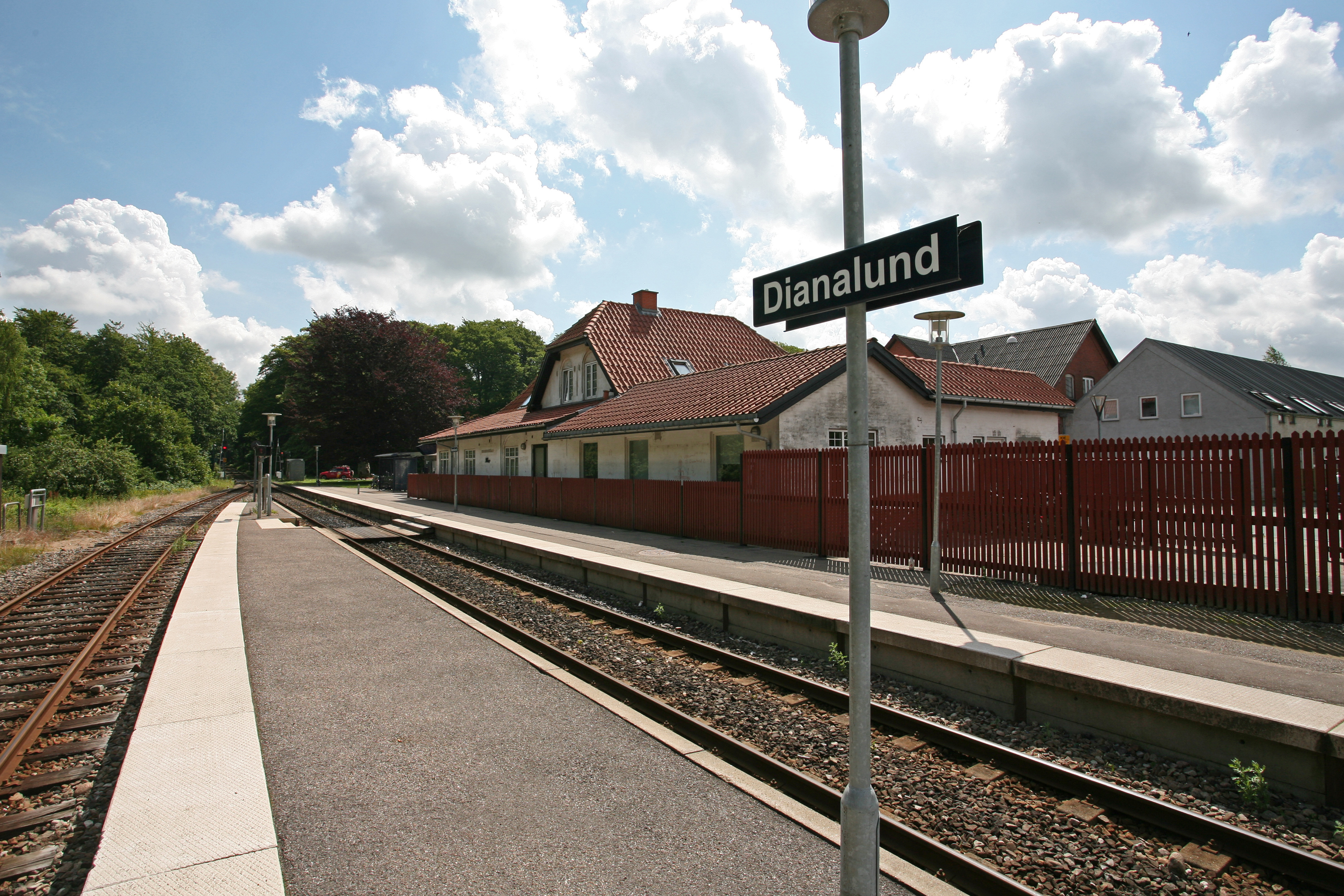
Dianalund station

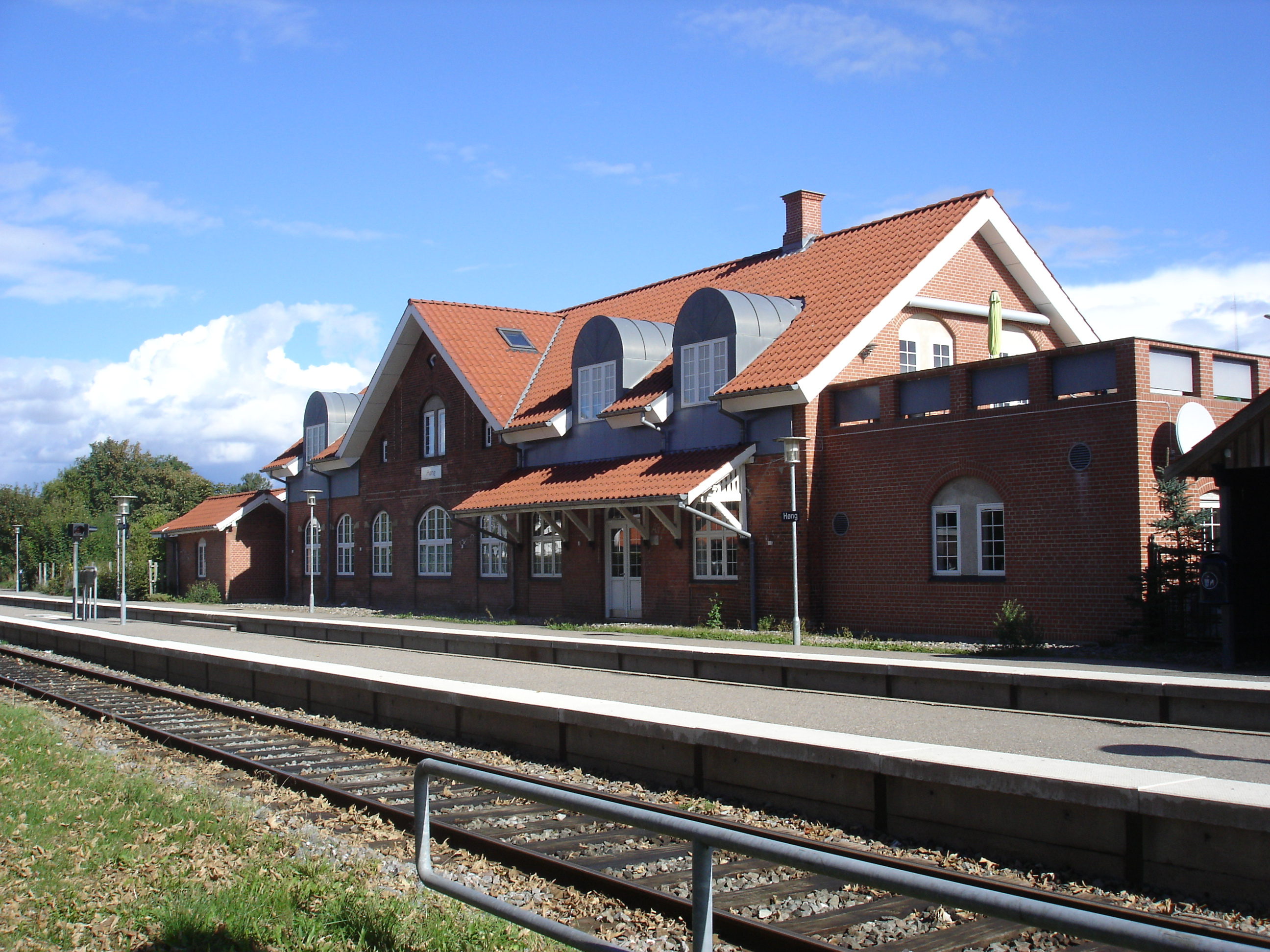
Høng station

- Tølløse
- Kirke Eskilstrup
- Udstrup, closed
- Store Merløse
- Bagmarken
- Nyrup
- Oustrup, closed in 1975
- Stenlille
- Vedde
- Dianalund
- Skellebjerg
- Konradineslyst, closed
- Hestehaven, opened in 1929, closed in 1974
- Ruds Vedby
- Kulby, closed
- Høng
- Løve, closed in 2011
- Havrebjerg, closed in 2011
- Slagelse

== See also ==
- List of railway lines in Denmark
