= Store Merløse =

Town in Denmark

- Town
- Location in Denmark Store Merløse (Denmark Region Zealand)
- Coordinates: 55°32′42″N 11°42′40″E
- Country: Denmark
- Region: Region Zealand
- Municipality: Holbæk Municipality

Area
  - Urban: 0.91 km^{2} (0.35 sq mi)

Population (2026)
  - Urban: 1,188
  - Urban density: 1,300/km^{2} (3,400/sq mi)
- Time zone: UTC+1 (CET)
  - Summer (DST): UTC+2 (CEST)
- Postal code: 4370 Store Merløse

Store Merløse is a town on Sjælland in Denmark with a population of 1,188 (1 January 2026). It is part of the municipality of Holbæk and close to Tølløse and Ringsted. It is a calm town with a primary school and a few businesses. For high school most people go to Tølløse. There is a local train from Vestsjællands Lokalbaner that will take you from Store Merløse to Tølløse or Slagelse.

== Notable people ==
- Emil Nielsen (born 1993 in Store Merløse) a Danish professional footballer for Lyngby Boldklub
