= Emil Nielsen =

Danish footballer (born 1993)

Personal information
- Full name: Lasse Emil Nielsen
- Date of birth: 8 November 1993 (age 33)
- Place of birth: Store Merløse, Denmark
- Height: 5 ft 10 in (1.78 m)
- Position: Forward

Team information
- Current team: Roskilde
- Number: 7

Youth career
- MUK
- Roskilde

Senior career*
Years	Team	Apps	(Gls)
2011–2014	Roskilde	71	(46)
2015–2016	Rosenborg	5	(0)
2015–2016	→ AGF (loan)	4	(1)
2016–2019	Roskilde	71	(29)
2019–2022	Lyngby	78	(14)
2023	Orange County SC	11	(2)
2023–	Roskilde	70	(19)

International career
2012	Denmark U19	3	(3)
- * Club domestic league appearances and goals as of 18 June 2026

Lasse Emil Nielsen (Danish pronunciation: [ˈlæsə e̝ˈmiˀl ˈne̝lsn̩]; born 8 November 1993), simply known as Emil Nielsen, is a Danish professional footballer who plays as a forward for FC Roskilde.

== Career ==
Growing up in Store Merløse, Nielsen started playing for local side, MUK before being signed to the youth academy of FC Roskilde. After making the first team, he helped Roskilde reach promotion to the Danish second tier during the 2013–14 season. He featured regularly for the club, ending the season with a staggering 34 goals, making him the topscorer of the division.

On 7 July 2014, Nielsen joined Norwegian Eliteserien club Rosenborg. After making only five appearances for Rosenborg in his first season, Nielsen joined AGF on 31 August 2015 on a one-year loan deal with the option for a permanent contract. His time in Aarhus was marred by injuries and he only made four appearances during the season, scoring one goal. At the end of the season, AGF did not pick up the buy option and he returned to Rosenborg. Upon his return, Rosenborg-coach Kåre Ingebrigtsen expressed that, considering the club's strength at the winger position, it would be difficult for Nielsen to find his way into the squad, and that a solution had to be found.

On 17 August 2016, Nielsen rejoined Danish 1st Division club FC Roskilde on a two-year contract, hoping to refind his old form after only making 15 total appearances in two seasons. His time in Roskilde was a success, and in his final season in the club he scored 20 goals in 29 appearances. His performances earned him the 2019 Danish 1st Division Player of the Year Award.

On 27 June 2019, Nielsen joined Lyngby Boldklub one a three-year contract. He suffered relegation to the Danish 1st Division with the club on 9 May 2021 after a loss to last placed AC Horsens.

On 2 January 2023, it was announced that Nielsen had signed with Orange County SC of the USL Championship. In June 2023, Nielsen returned to FC Roskilde.

== Career statistics ==
=== Club ===
As of match played 30 October 2022

Appearances and goals by club, season and competition
Club	Season	League			Cup (Note: Includes Danish Cup, Norwegian Football Cup, U.S. Open Cup)		Continental		Other		Total	
Club	Season	Division	Apps	Goals	Apps	Goals	Apps	Goals	Apps	Goals	Apps	Goals
Roskilde	2012–13	2nd Division	24	6	0	0	—		—		24	6
Roskilde	2013–14	2nd Division	30	33	2	0	—		—		32	33
Roskilde	2014–15	1st Division	17	7	3	0	—		—		20	7
Roskilde	Total		71	46	5	0	—		—		76	46
Rosenborg	2015	Tippeligaen	5	0	4	3	2 (Note: Appearances in UEFA Europa League)	0	—		11	3
AGF (loan)	2015–16	Danish Superliga	4	1	0	0	—		—		4	1
Roskilde	2016–17	1st Division	25	4	1	0	—		—		26	4
Roskilde	2017–18	1st Division	17	5	0	0	—		—		17	5
Roskilde	2018–19	1st Division	29	20	3	5	—		—		32	25
Roskilde	Total		71	29	4	5	—		—		75	34
Lyngby	2019–20	Danish Superliga	27	2	0	0	—		1 (Note: Appearances in the Superliga relegation play-offs)	0	28	2
Lyngby	2020–21	Danish Superliga	25	5	3	4	—		—		28	9
Lyngby	2021–22	1st Division	17	5	1	4	—		—		18	9
Lyngby	2022–23	Danish Superliga	9	2	1	0	—		—		10	2
Lyngby	Total		78	14	5	8	0	0	1	0	84	22
Orange County SC	2023	USL Championship	9	2	2	1	—		0	0	11	3
Career total			238	92	20	17	2	0	1	0	261	109

== Honours ==
Individual

- Danish 2nd Division top scorer: 2013–14 (33 goals)
- Danish 1st Division top scorer: 2018–19 (20 goals) [joint with Ronnie Schwartz
