= Ella Ungermann =

Danish stage actress (1891–1921)

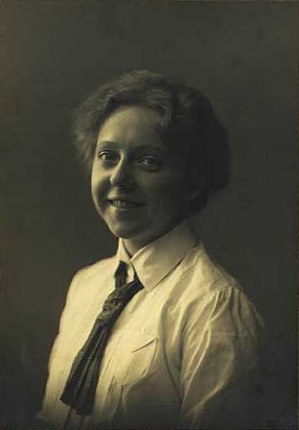
Ella Ungermann (c. 1920)

Ella Christoffersen Ungermann (1891–1921) was a Danish stage actress. While working as a secretary, without any formal training she made her debut in April 1909 in Copenhagen's Odd Fellows Palæet in a semi-private performance of Hønsegaarden. After two years at Odense Teater, she moved back to Copenhagen where she was engaged by the Royal Danish Theatre in 1914. Enjoying considerable success for several years, she committed suicide in September 1921, a few days after playing Leonora in Holberg's Det lykkelige Skibbrud.

== Early life and education ==
Born in Slagelse on 17 February 1891, Ella Christiffersen Ungermann was the daughter of the baker Valdemar Christoffersen (1859–1937) and Marie Christine Ungermann (1868–1941). In October 1918, she married the painter Albert Emil August Schleppegrell Naur (1889–1973). They had no children.

After completing her Realskole education in 1907, she took up secretarial work in Copenhagen. Without any formal training in drama, she made her debut on 28 April 1909 in Hønsegaarden in a semi-private performance in Copenhagen's Odd Fellows Palæet. She then went on to perform a variety of tasks in Odense over the next two years, including a role in Schiller's Maria Stuart.

== Career ==
In 1911, she returned to Copenhagen, intending to undergo training at the Royal Theatre School. Before she could do so, however, she was engaged by Ivar Schmidt to perform at Det Ny Teater as Dina Dorf in Ibsen's Samfundets Stætter. Other successes in Odense included En Vesterbrodreng and Lovens Arm.

In 1914, she was engaged by the Royal Theatre to perform the title role in Hadda Padda by the Icelandic dramatist Guðmundur Kamban. Thereafter Ungermann underwent a painful chin operation which successfully cured her lisp. She nevertheless continued to be concerned about her lack of a formal theatrical education, suffering from a serious minority complex. On the stage, however, she performed faultlessly, showing no signs of her concerns. She excelled, for example, in Holger Drachmann's melodrama Vølund Smed.

Suffering not only from a lack of confidence but also from the limited opportunities for performing attractive roles in the early 1920s, when only 30 years of age Ella Ungermann committed suicide on 23 September 1921, just a few days after playing Leonora in Det lykkelige Skibbrud. She was buried in Søllerød Cemetery.
