= Ernst Pedersen =

Danish sports shooter (born 1935)

Personal information
- Born: 8 October 1935 (age 90) Slagelse, Denmark

Sport
- Sport: Sports shooting

Ernst Pedersen (born 8 October 1935) is a Danish former sports shooter. He competed at the 1968 Summer Olympics and the 1976 Summer Olympics.
