= Elle Klarskov Jørgensen =

Danish sculptor

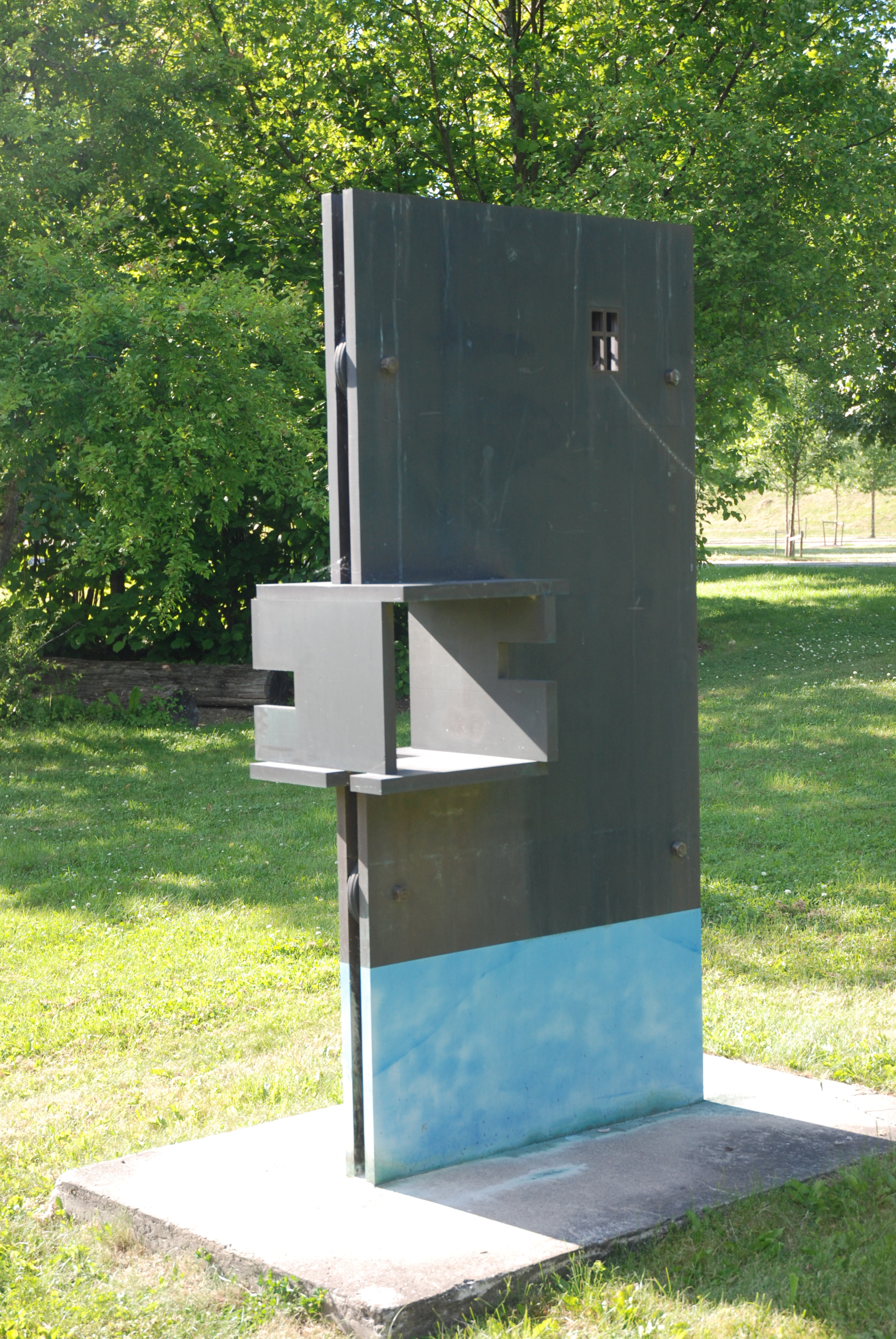
Elle Klarskov Jørgensen: Den vertikala tiden, Linköpings University

Elle Klarskov Jørgensen (born 27 March 1958) is a Danish sculptor. Born in Slagelse, she attended the Royal Danish Academy of Fine Arts where she studied under Willy Ørskov and Hein Heinsen (1978–87). She has exhibited installations and more simple works inspired by Constructivism and Minimalism.
