= Poul Moll Nielsen =

Danish hockey player

Personal information
- Nationality: Danish
- Born: 21 April 1930 Slagelse, Denmark
- Died: 5 September 1992 (aged 62) Slagelse, Denmark

Sport
- Sport: Field hockey

Poul Moll Nielsen (21 April 1930 – 5 September 1992) was a Danish field hockey player. He competed at the 1948 Summer Olympics and the 1960 Summer Olympics.
