= Erik Eliasen =

Erik Eliasen (9 September 1922 – 11 October 2008) was a Danish meteorologist.

He was born in Slagelse. He was a professor of meteorology at the University of Copenhagen from 1961 to 1992. He was a fellow of the Norwegian Academy of Science and Letters from 1988.
