= Slagelse railway station =

Railway station in Slagelse Municipality, Denmark

Slagelse
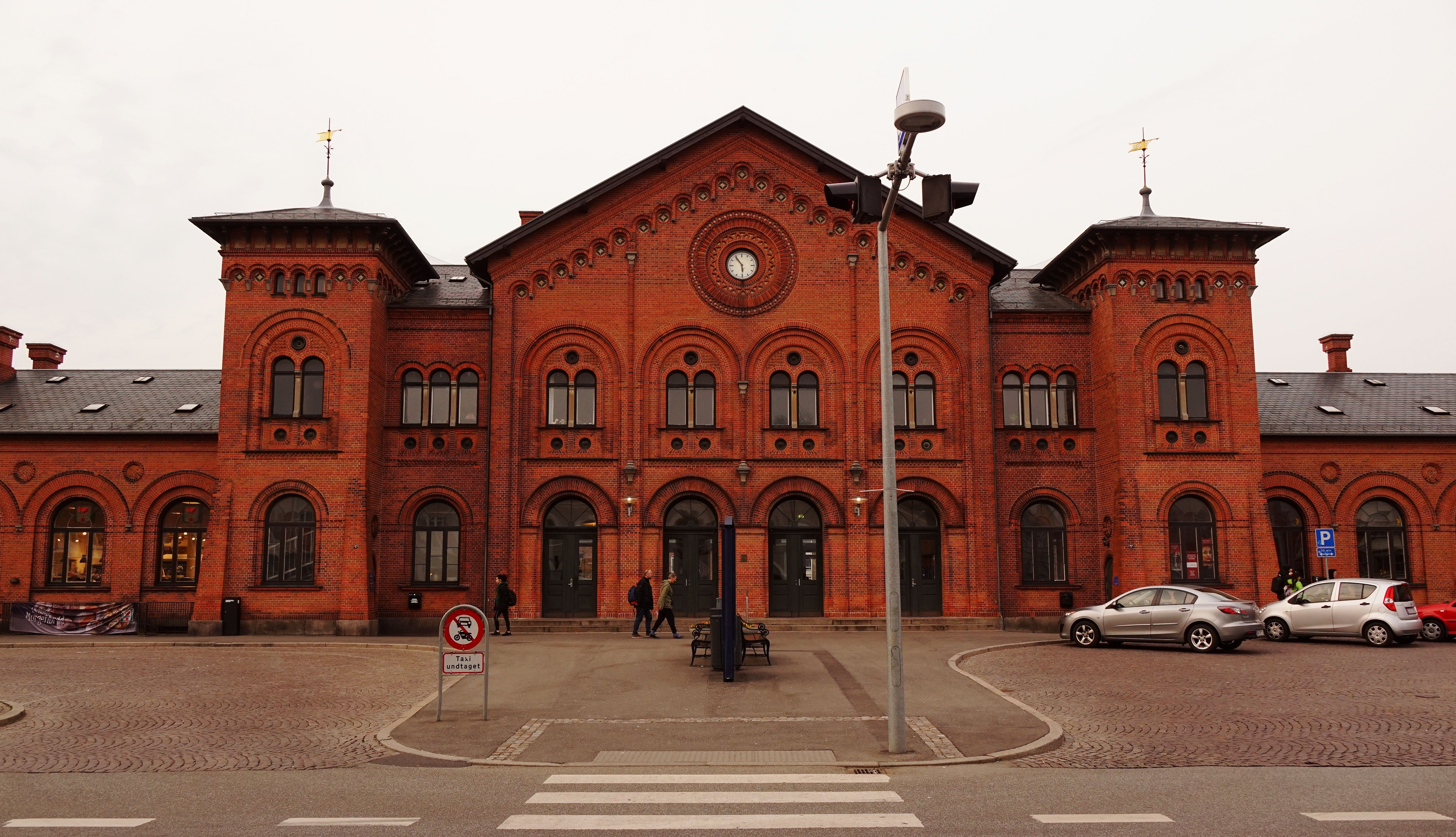
- Street facade of Slagelse station in 2019

General information
- Location: Sønder Stationsvej 28A; 4200 Slagelse; Slagelse Municipality; Denmark
- Coordinates: 55°24′26.32″N 11°20′56.19″E
- Elevation: 33.7 metres (111 ft)
- Owner: DSB (station infrastructure); Banedanmark (rail infrastructure)
- Lines: Copenhagen–Fredericia Line; Tølløse Line; Slagelse–Værslev (closed 1971); Slagelse–Næstved (closed 1971)
- Platforms: 3
- Tracks: 5
- Train operators: DSB; Lokaltog

Construction
- Architect: Niels Peder Christian Holsøe (1892)

Other information
- Website: Official website

History
- Opened: 27 April 1856
- Rebuilt: 15 May 1892

Services
Preceding station	DSB	Following station
Sorø towards Copenhagen Central	Copenhagen-Aalborg InterCity	Korsør towards Aalborg Airport
Sorø towards Østerport	Copenhagen–Esbjerg InterCity	Korsør towards Esbjerg
Sorø towards Copenhagen Airport	Copenhagen–Slagelse Regional train	Terminus
Preceding station	Lokaltog	Following station
Høng towards Tølløse	Tølløse Line Local train	Terminus
Location

Slagelse railway station (Danish: Slagelse Station or Slagelse Banegård) is the main railway station serving the town of Slagelse in southwestern Zealand, Denmark. It is located in the centre of the town, on the northern edge of the historic town centre, and immediately adjacent to the Slagelse bus station.

Slagelse station is located on the main line Copenhagen–Fredericia railway from Copenhagen to Funen and Jutland. It is also the southern terminus of the Tølløse branch line from Slagelse to Tølløse on the Northwest Line. The station opened in 1856, and was moved to its current location in 1892. Its second and current station building designed by the architect Niels Peder Christian Holsøe was inaugurated in 1892. It was listed on the Danish register of protected buildings and places in 1992.

The station offers direct InterCity services to Copenhagen, Funen and Jutland, regional rail services to Copenhagen and Odense operated by the national railway company DSB, as well as local train services to Tølløse, operated by the regional railway company Lokaltog.

== History ==
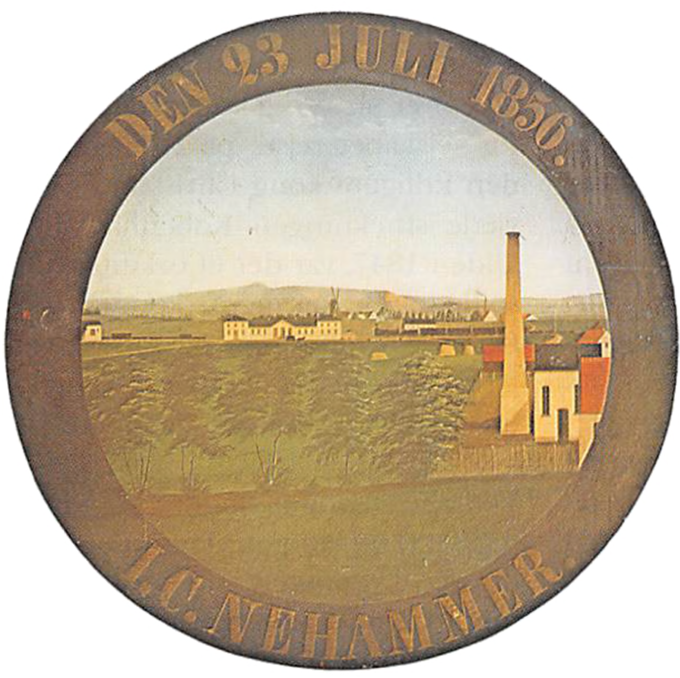
The first railway station seen on an 1856 target from Slagelse Shooting Society.

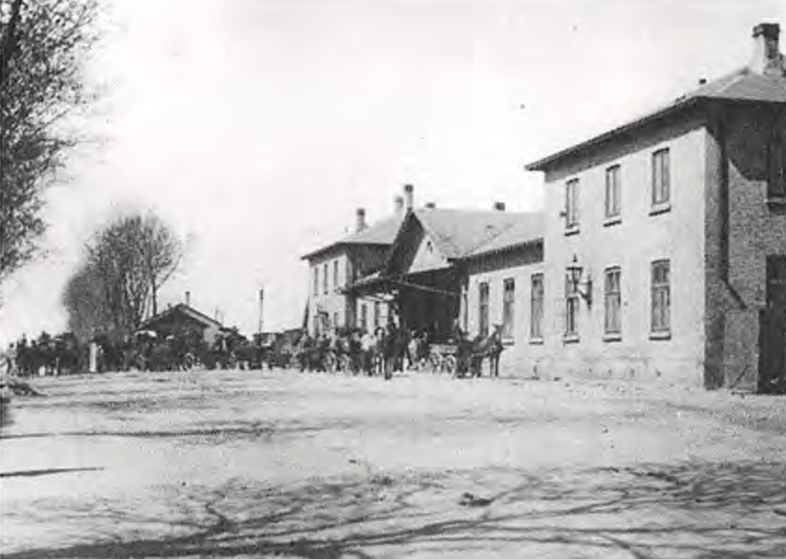
The first station building..

The first railway station in Slagelse was constructed in 1856 as a stop on the railway between Roskilde and Korsør. The section from Copenhagen to Roskilde had already been inaugurated in 1847. The station was located some 500 metres outside Slagelse. The official inauguration of the rail line took place on 26 April 1856. King Frederick VII and Countess Danner were among the passengers of the first train that stopped at the station. They briefly left the train in Slagelse. The train made another stop at Dr¨by Railway Bridge just west of the city to allow for the official guests to admire the structure. Trains left twice daily in each direction. The travel time from Copenhagen to Slagelse was two hours and 43 minutes.

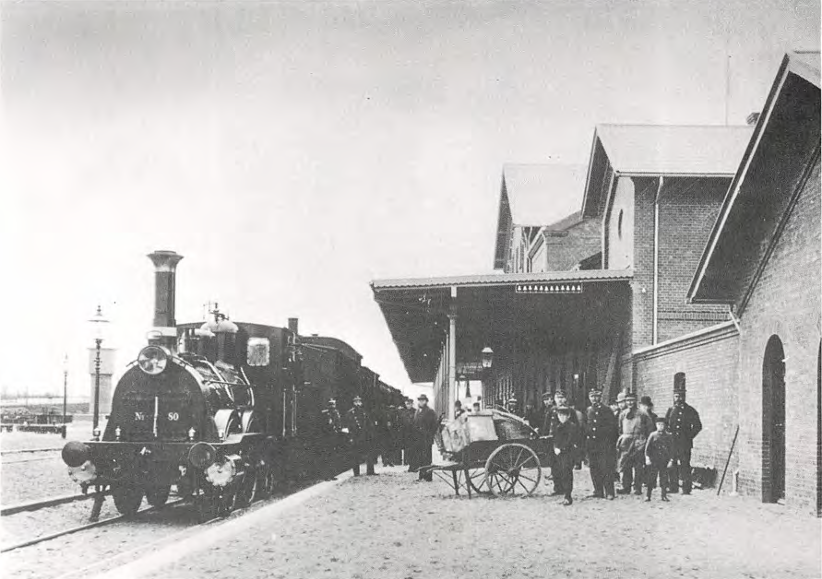
From the inauguration of the new station, 1892..

Slagelse station's second and current station building was built from 1891 to 1892 to designs by the Danish architect Niels Peder Christian Holsøe (1826–1895), known for the numerous railway stations he designed across Denmark in his capacity of head architect of the Danish State Railways. The station building was listed in 1992. The new station building was constructed in conjunction with the decision to build the Slagelse-Næstved, Dalmose-Skælskør and Slagelse-Værslev rail lines. The more central location of the new station building in Slagelse made it necessary to move 23,000 cubic metres of soil. The Slagelse-Næstved and Dalmose-Skælskør lines were inaugurated on 15 May 1892.

== Cultural references ==
Slagelse railway station is used as a location in the 1942 Danish comedy film Frk. Vildkat.

== See also ==
- List of railway stations in Denmark
