= Andrea Krætzmer =

Danish ballet dancer

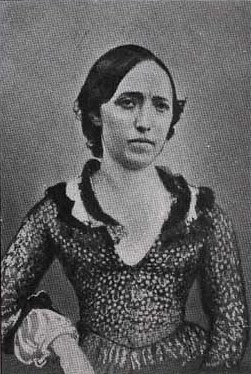
- Krætzmer in the 1850s
- Born: Andrea Møll; 15 March 1811; Slagelse, Denmark
- Died: 25 January 1889 (aged 77); Copenhagen
- Occupation: Ballerina
- Years active: 1824–1845

Andrea Marie Krætzmer (née Møller; 15 March 1811 – 25 January 1889) was a Danish ballet dancer who was a soloist in the early ballets of August Bournonville.

== Early life ==
Born in Slagelse, as a small child she moved to Copenhagen with her parents where her father was employed at the Hotel du Nord. In 1918, when she was eight years old, she joined the ballet school at Copenhagen's Royal Theatre. She first appeared on stage in 1824, dancing as a 12-year-old in Vicenzo Galeotti's Bjergbøndernes Børn og Spejlet.

== Career ==
She impressed August Bournonville with her dancing, particularly her outstanding performance in 1829 when she danced Therese in Søvngængersken, a Danish production of La Somnambule which Bournonville had discovered in Paris. She went on to dance Virginie in Bournonville's Paul og Virginie and Margaretha in his Faust (1932), gaining the status of a soloist.

After a questionable pregnancy, an unsuccessful marriage, periods of illness, and increasing problems with Bournonville and the Royal Theatre, in 1831 she was finally punished with a month's imprisonment in Copenhagen Castle's Blue Tower. She returned to the theatre where she again received acclaim for dancing Margarethe in Faust. However, after further disputes with the theatre, in 1834 she left to dance in Stockholm, St Petersburg and Moscow, but did not meet with much success. She returned to Copenhagen in 1845 where she again danced in La Somanbule and Faust, but her career was over.

== Assessment ==
In his Mit Theaterliv, Bournonville praised Krætzmer's graceful style and interesting personality although he was not so happy with her private life. As a guest dancer in Copenhagen in 1829, he had found her the only member of the ballet who could match his own ability. Johanne Luise Heiberg, who had trained with her at the ballet school, commented that she "performed her role in La Somnambule with grace, innocence and fervor that was quite adorable."
