= Villy Moll Nielsen =

Danish hockey player (1927–2014)

Personal information
- Nationality: Danish
- Born: 22 November 1927 Slagelse, Denmark
- Died: 14 December 2014 (aged 87) Slagelse, Denmark

Sport
- Sport: Field hockey

Villy Moll Nielsen (22 November 1927 – 14 December 2014) was a Danish field hockey player. He competed in the men's tournament at the 1960 Summer Olympics. Nielsen died in Slagelse on 14 December 2014, at the age of 87.
