= Torben Alstrup Jensen =

Danish hockey player

Personal information
- Nationality: Danish
- Born: 7 August 1930 Slagelse, Denmark
- Died: 30 November 2007 (aged 77)

Sport
- Sport: Field hockey

Torben Alstrup Jensen (7 August 1930 – 30 November 2007) was a Danish field hockey player. He competed in the men's tournament at the 1960 Summer Olympics.
