= Ludvig Abelin Schou =

Danish painter

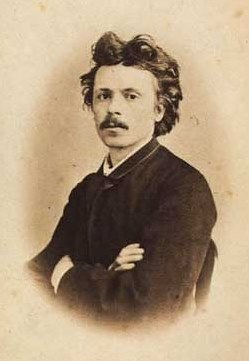
- Schou photographed in the 1860s.
- Born: January 11, 1838; Slagelse, Denmark
- Died: September 30, 1867 (aged 29); Florence

Ludvig Abelin Schou, known as L.A. Schou (11 January 1838, in Slagelse – 30 September 1867, in Florence), was a Danish Romantic painter, the older brother of Peter Alfred Schou.

== Biography ==
He was born to a family of merchants. When he was six, they moved to Copenhagen. At the age of eighteen, he passed the journeyman test to enter the Royal Danish Academy of Fine Arts. He studied with Niels Simonsen and Wilhelm Marstrand and was awarded two silver medals, in 1860 and 1861, when he began exhibiting portraits and small figure compositions. During 1860, he made a brief study trip to Belgium and the Netherlands.

He was dissatisfied with these works, however and, after failing to win a gold medal, nearly decided to quit painting and become a teacher or clerk. His hopes were restored after a relative gave him enough money to study in Italy.

He arrived in Rome in 1864 and lived in the nearby mountain villages until 1866. Despite a chronic illness, he managed to finish several genre works and hold a small exhibition. After that, he turned to works on Classical themes, completing his most familiar work depicting Chione killed by Diana (Artemis). In October 1866, he began to travel (briefly visiting Paris) and died of cholera in Florence.

His most ambitious work and one often described as his main work—Roman Workmen Transporting an Antique Imperial Statue from the Colosseum through the Arch of Titus to the Capitoline Museums was completed shortly before his death. It combined a Romantic appreciation of ancient Rome with elements of realism in the depiction of the Roman workers and spectators, and it received high praise when displayed in Copenhagen in 1868. In addition to his works of Classical mythology, he also did a series inspired by Ragnarök.

== Selected works ==
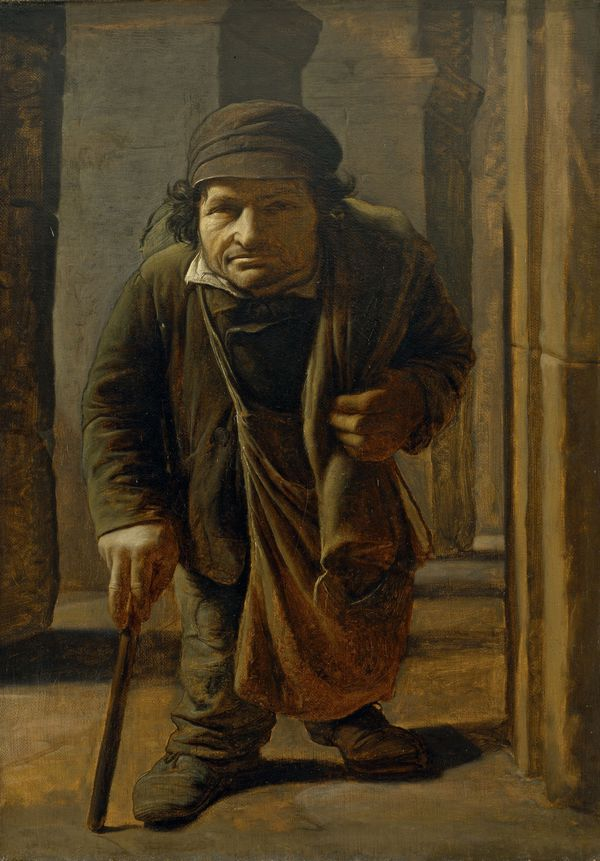
The Cloth Collector

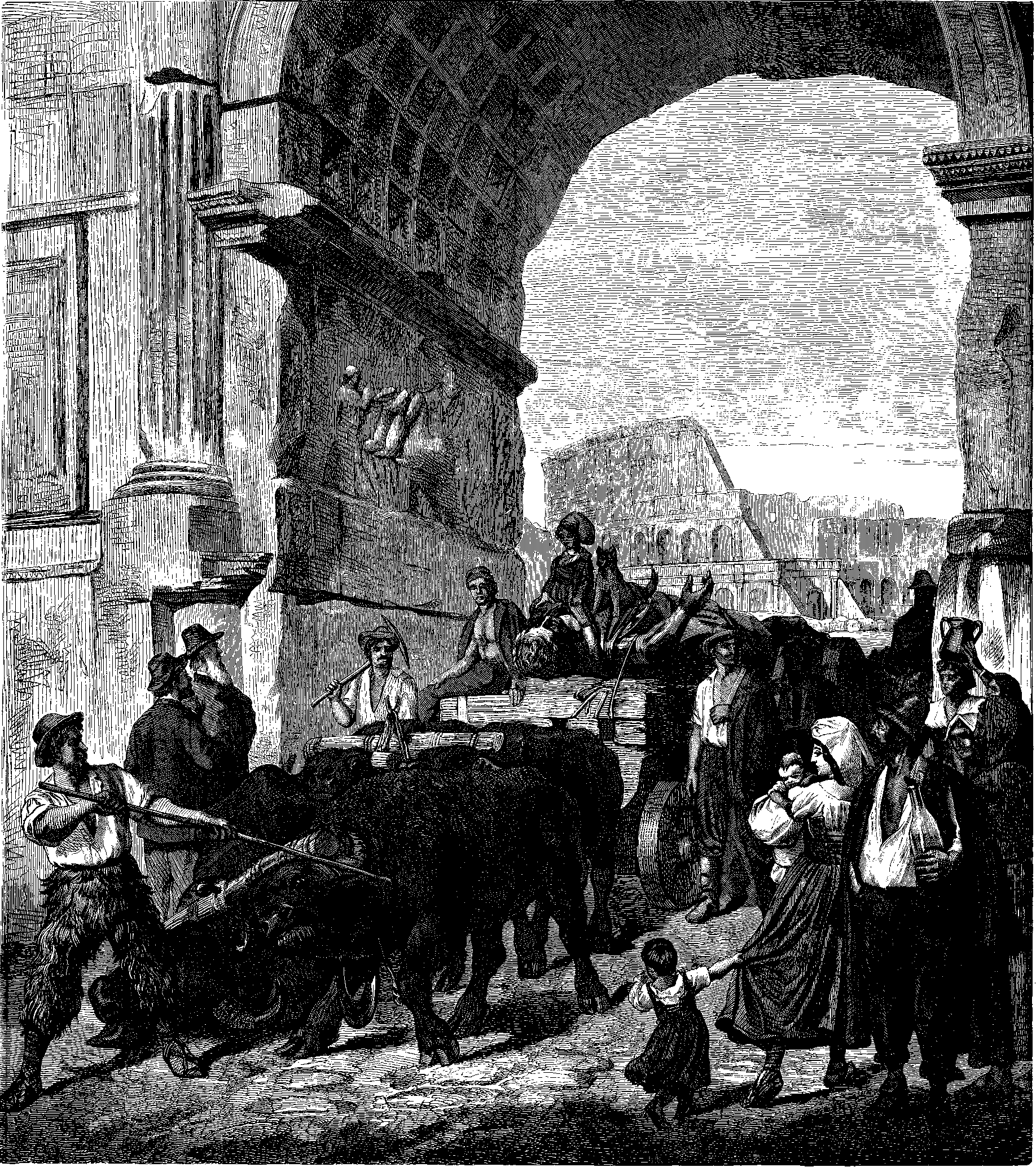
Roman Workmen..., engraving by
Otto Bache

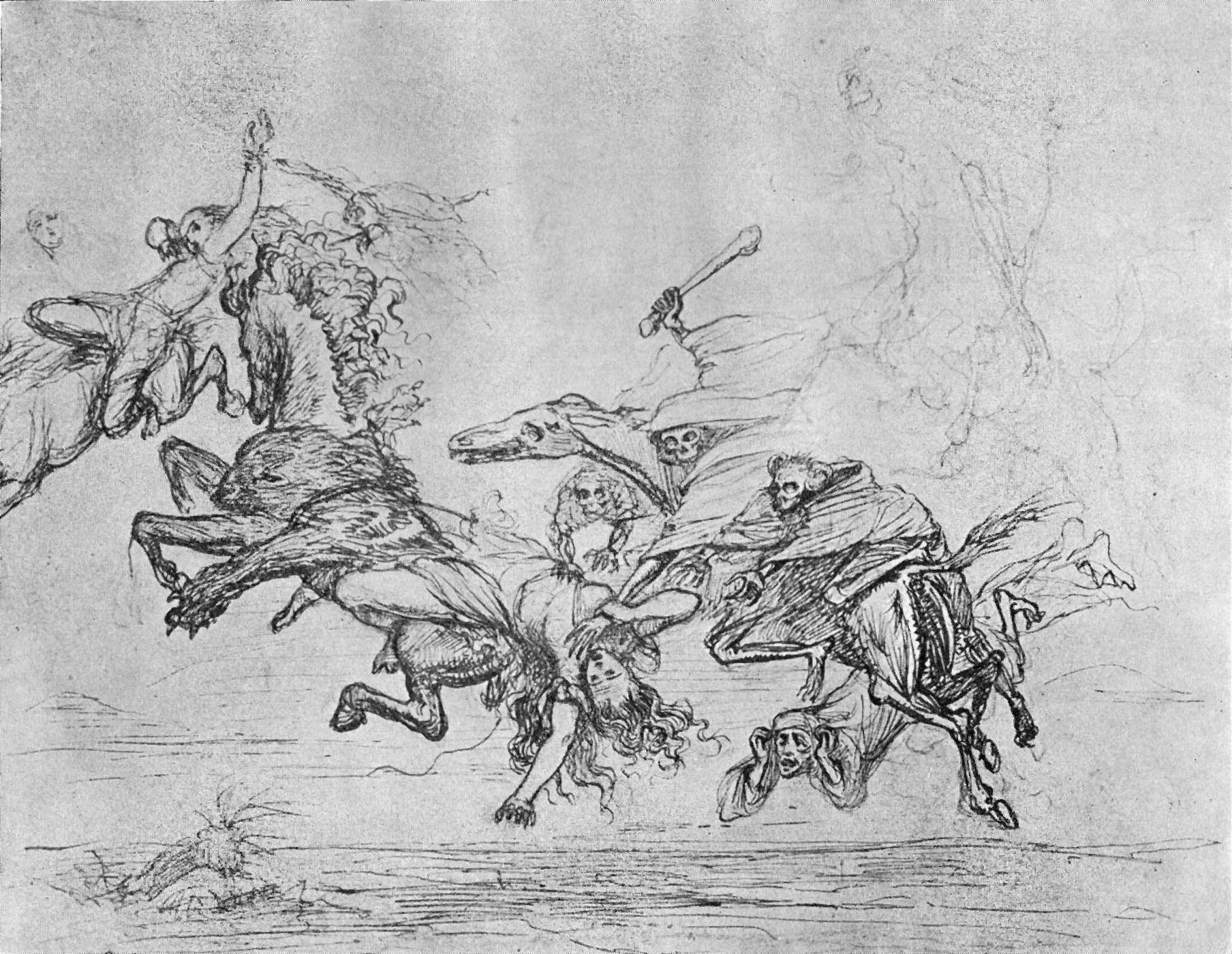
Hel and the Valkyries (Ragnarök)

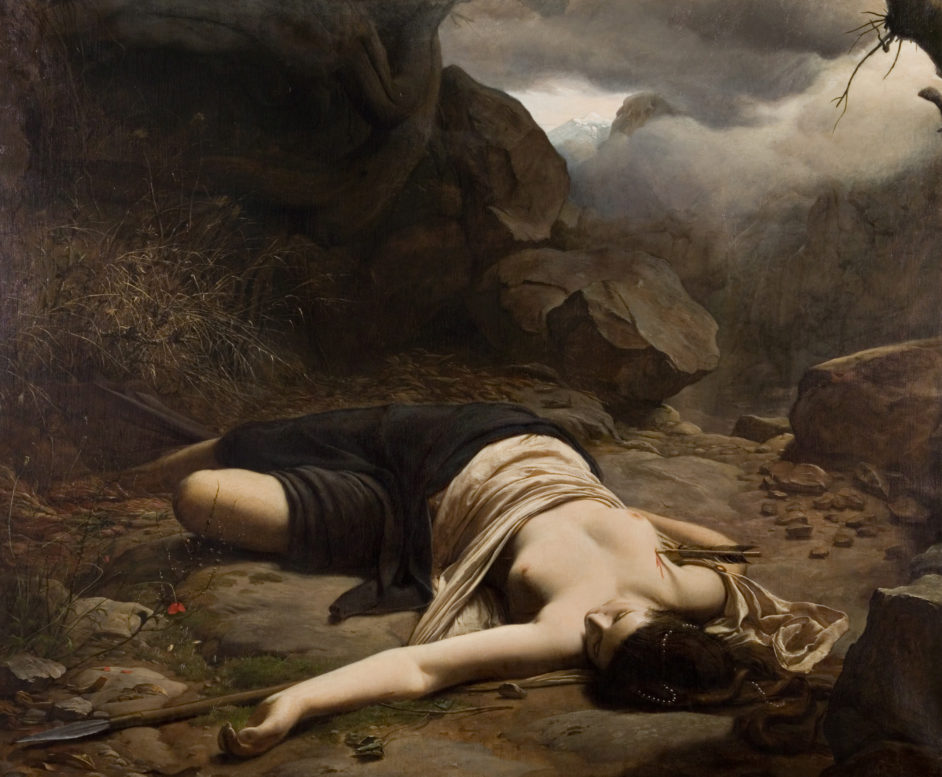
Chione Slain by Diana
