= Tølløse railway station =

Railway station in Zealand, Denmark

Tølløse
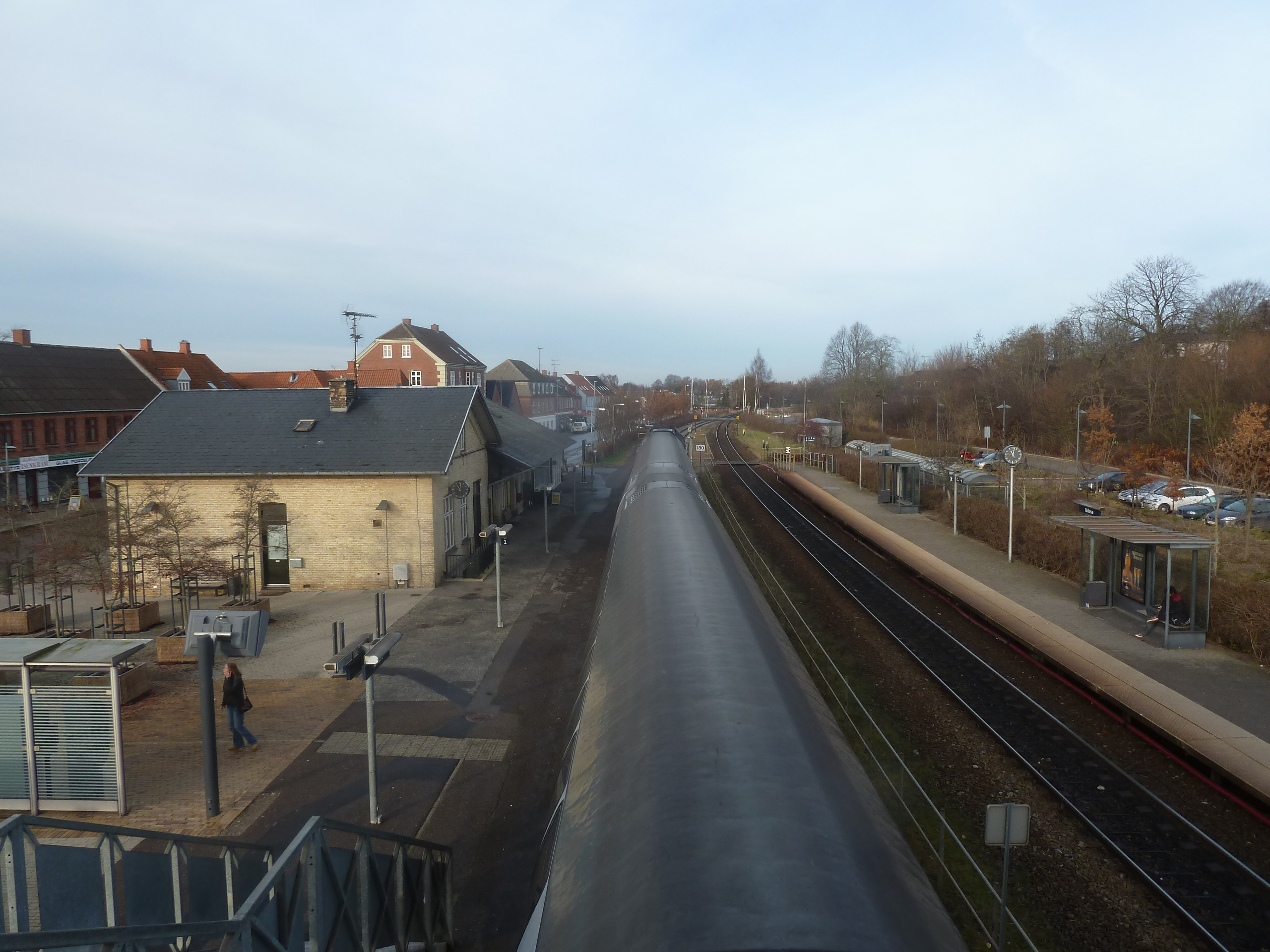
- Tølløse station in 2012

General information
- Location: Jernbanevej 17; 4340 Tølløse; Holbæk Municipality; Denmark
- Coordinates: 55°36′42.55″N 11°46′22.06″E
- Elevation: 47.4 metres (156 ft)
- Owner: DSB (station infrastructure); Banedanmark (rail infrastructure)
- Lines: Northwest Line; Tølløse Line
- Platforms: 2
- Tracks: 3
- Train operators: DSB; Lokaltog

Construction
- Architect: Niels Peder Christian Holsøe

Other information
- Station code: Tø
- Website: Official website

History
- Opened: 30 December 1874

Services
Preceding station	DSB	Following station
Hvalsø towards Helsingør	Elsinore–Copenhagen– Roskilde–Holbæk Regional train	Vipperød towards Holbæk
Preceding station	Lokaltog	Following station
Terminus	Tølløse Line Local train	Kirke Eskilstrup towards Slagelse
Location

Tølløse railway station is a railway station serving the railway town of Tølløse between the cities of Roskilde, Holbæk and Ringsted on the island of Zealand, Denmark.

Tølløse railway station is situated on the Northwest Line from Roskilde to Kalundborg. The station opened in 1874. It offers regional rail services to Holbæk, Roskilde and Copenhagen operated by the national railway company DSB and local train services to Slagelse operated by the regional railway company Lokaltog.

== History ==
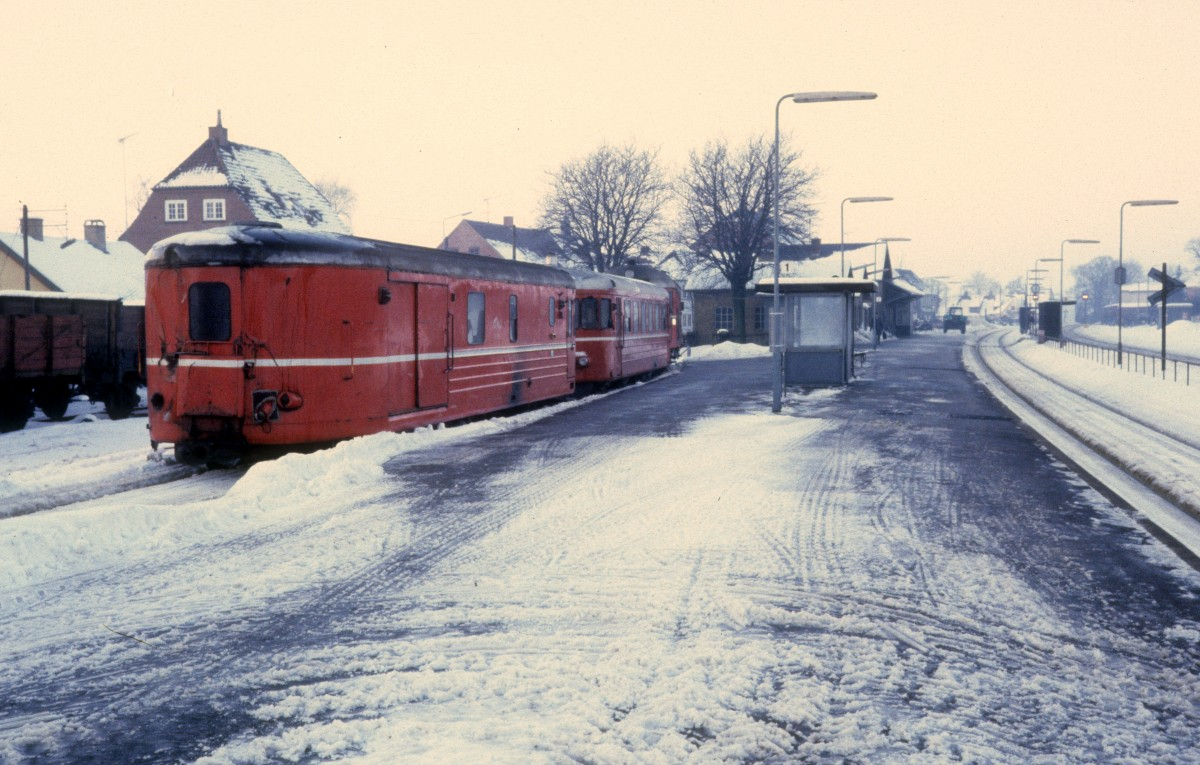
Tølløse station in 1981.

Tølløse railway station opened on 30 December 1874 as one of the original intermediate stations on the Northwest Line between Roskilde and Kalundborg.

Tølløse became a railway junction as the Tølløse railway line between Tølløse and Høng opened on 22 December 1901.

== Architecture ==
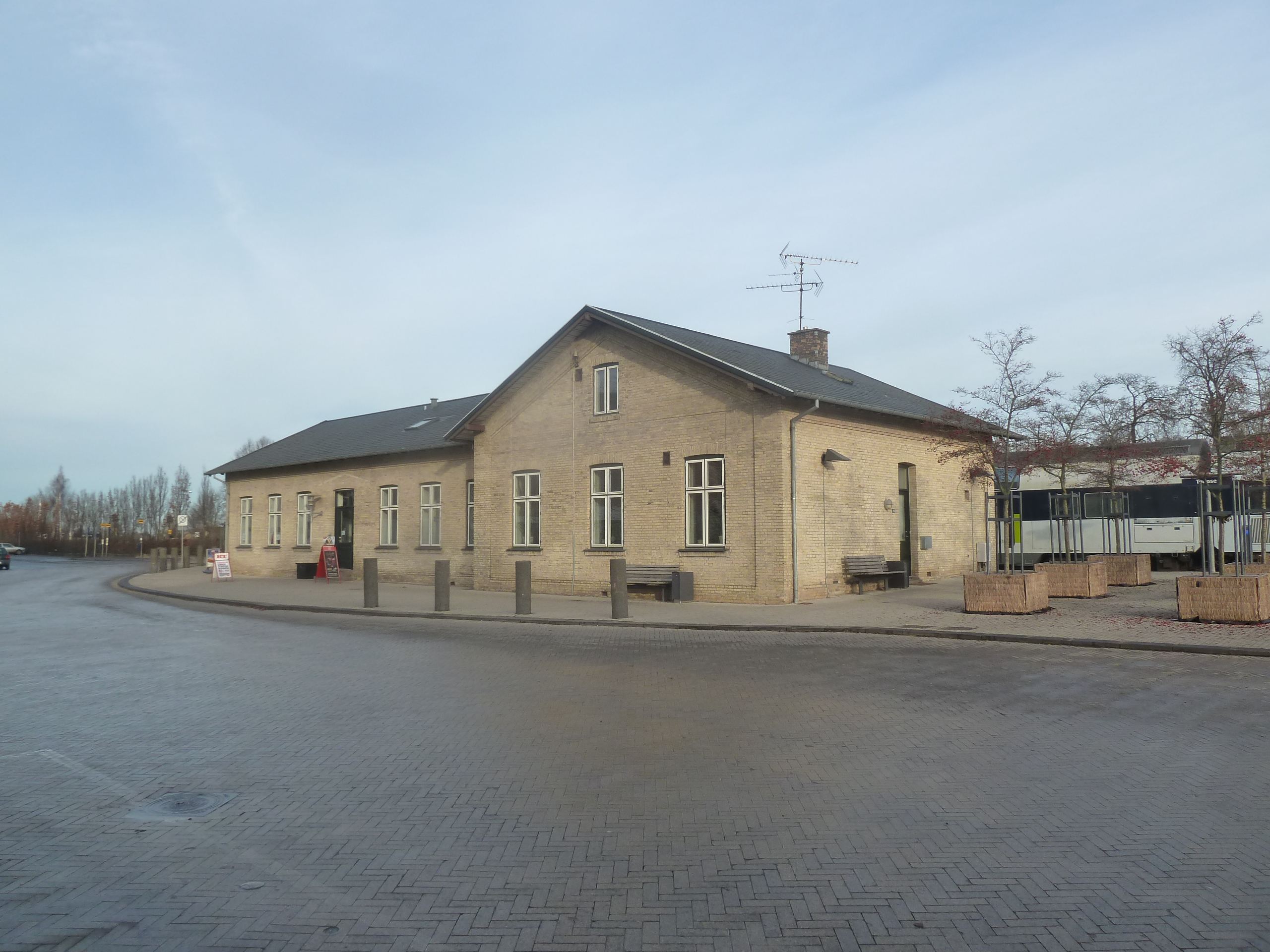
Street facade of the station building in 2012.

The original and still existing station building from 1874 was designed by the Danish architect Niels Peder Christian Holsøe (1826–1895), known for the numerous railway stations he designed across Denmark in his capacity of head architect of the Danish State Railways.

== Services ==
The station offers frequent regional rail services to Holbæk, Roskilde and Copenhagen operated by the national railway company DSB, as well as local train services across central Zealand to Slagelse operated by the regional railway company Lokaltog.

== Gallery ==
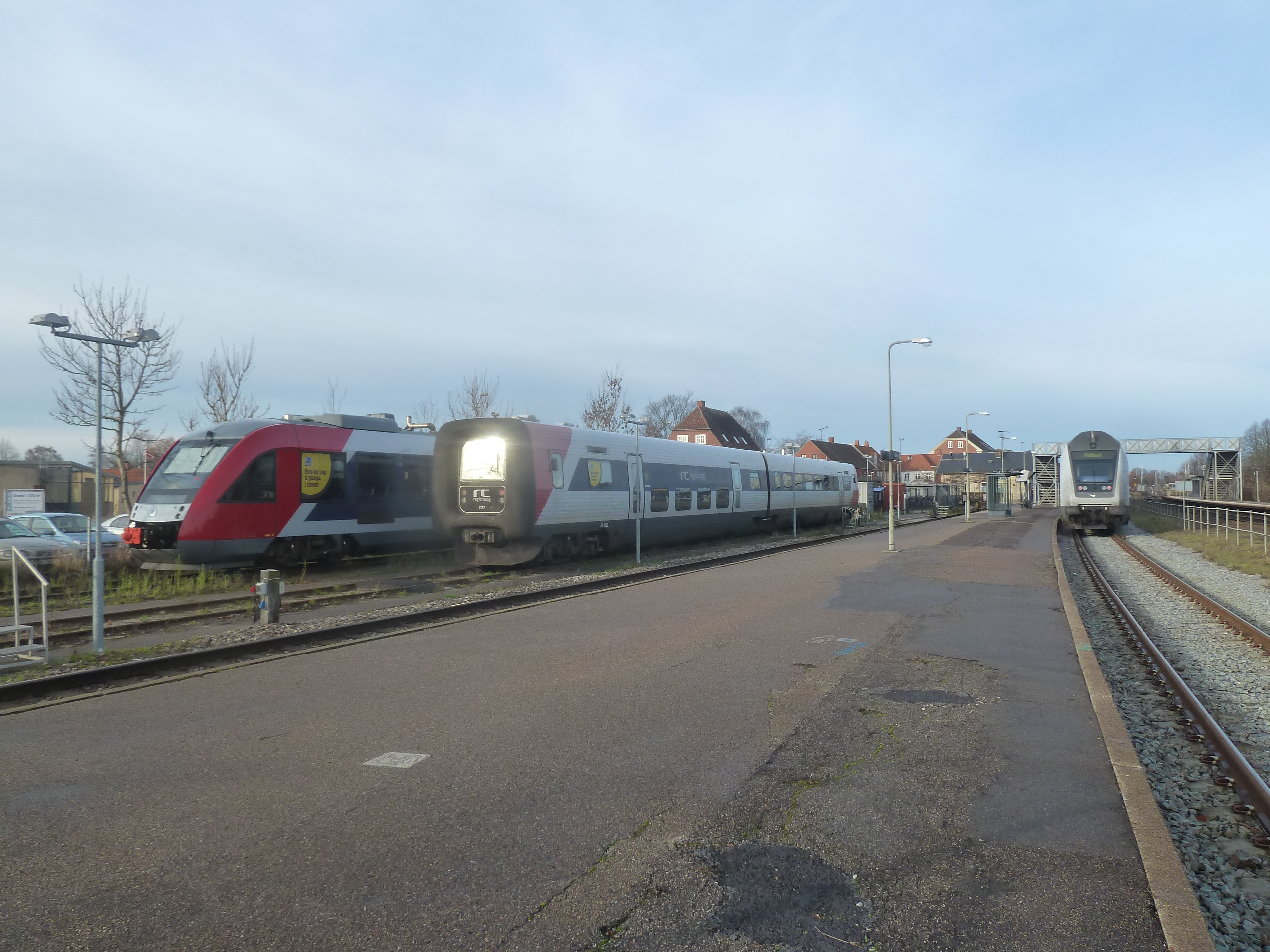
DSB and Lokaltog trains at Tølløse station in 2012

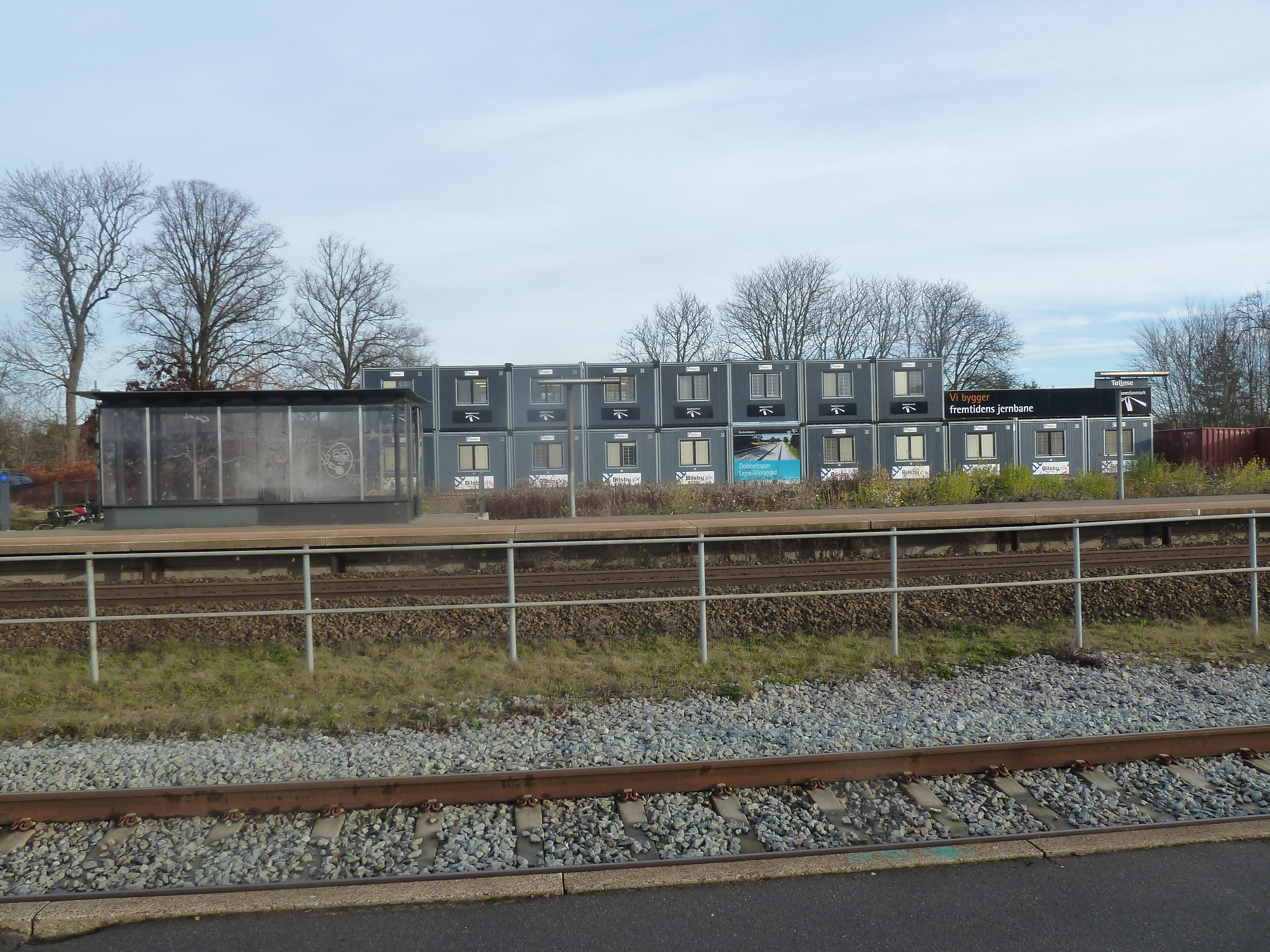
Tølløse station in 2012

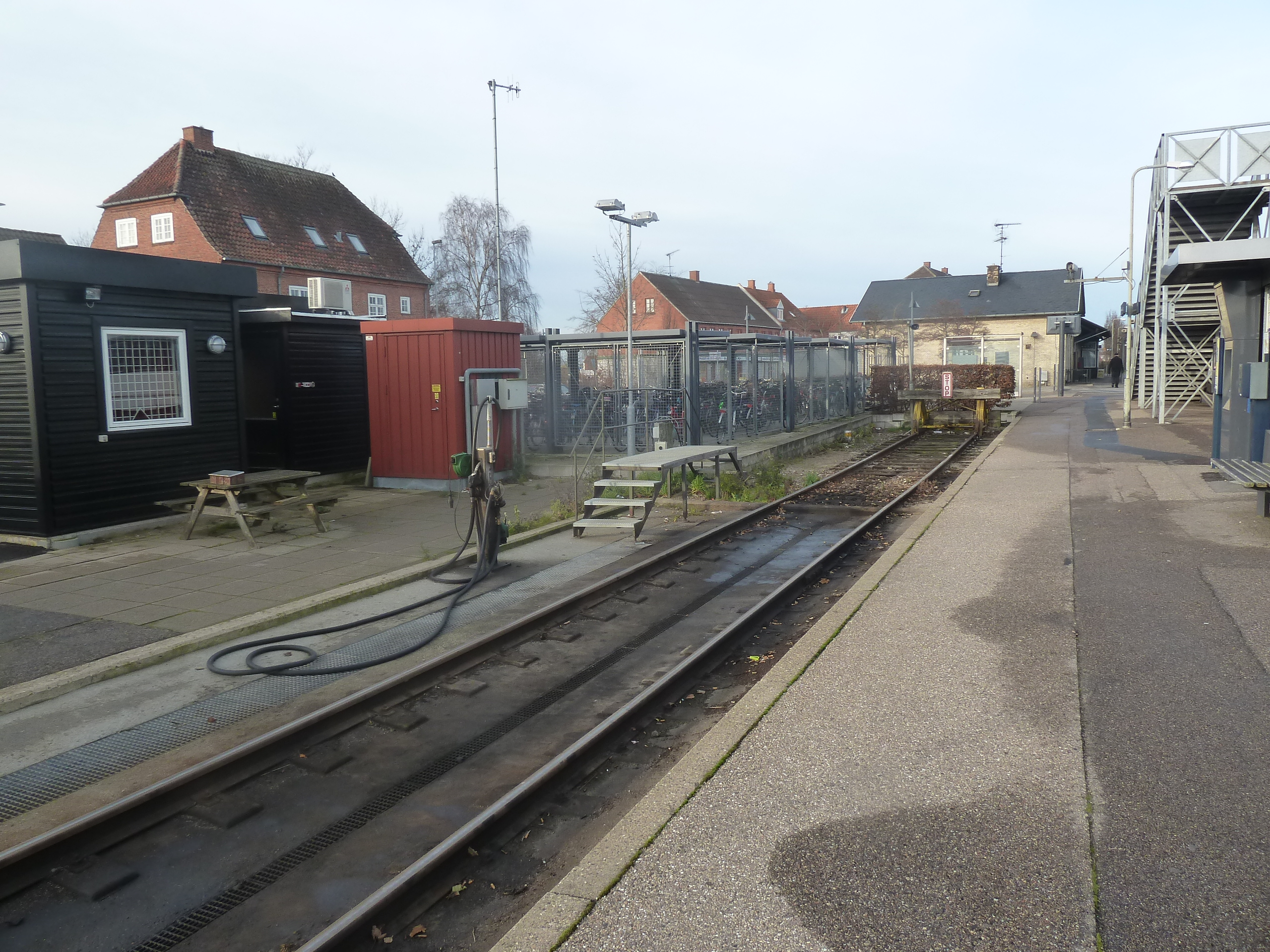
Tølløse station in 2012

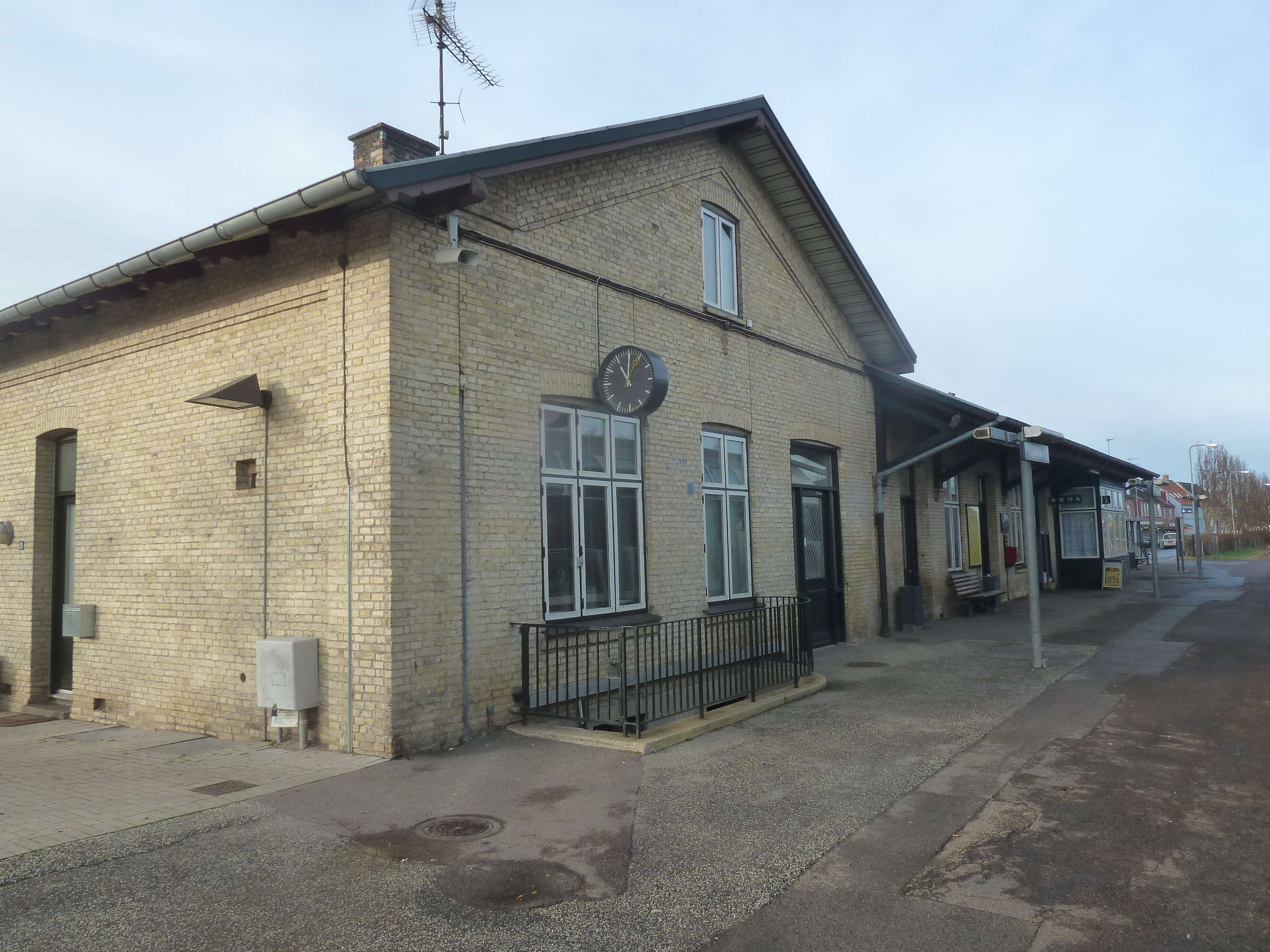
Tølløse station in 2012

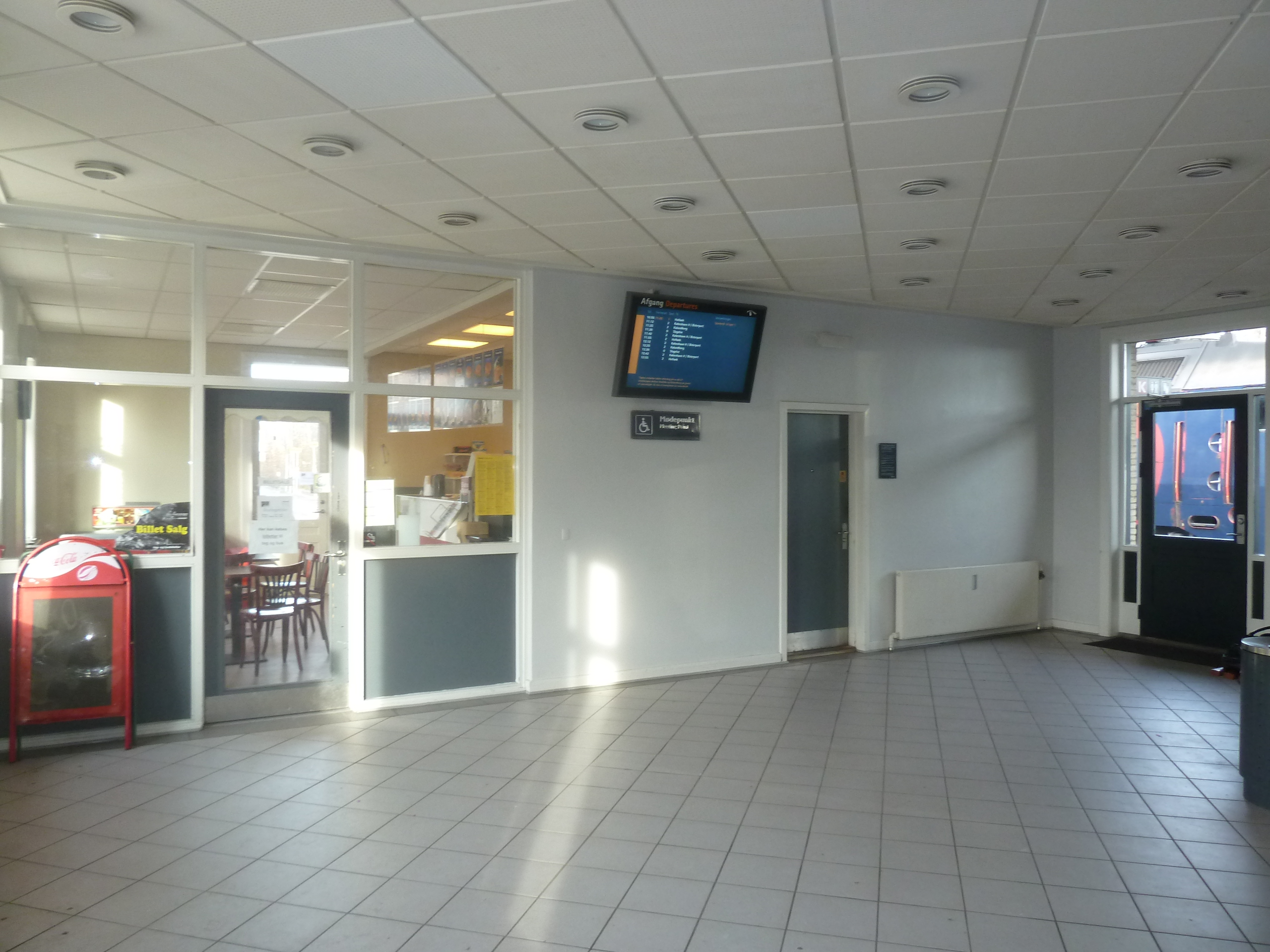
Tølløse station in 2012

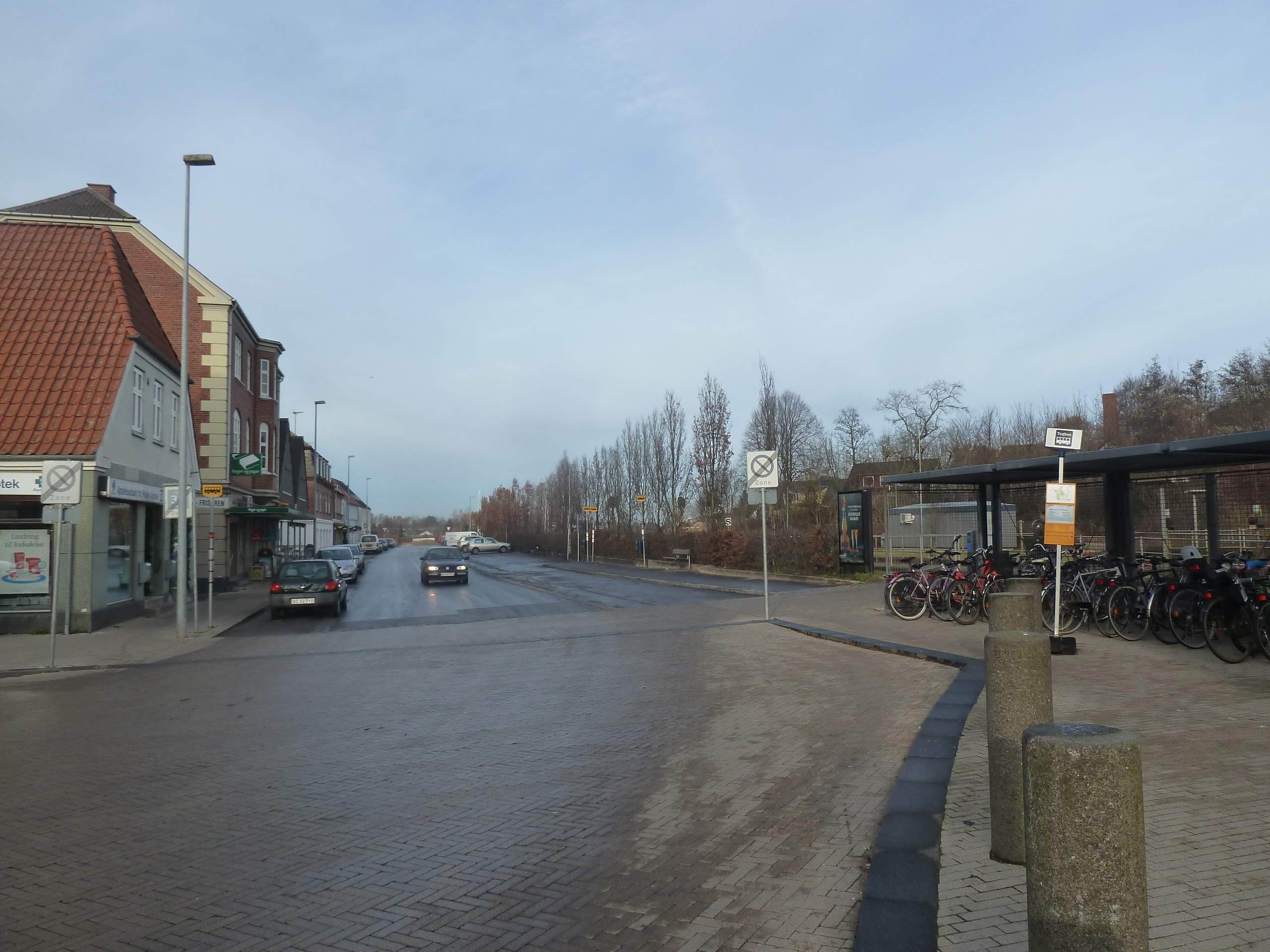
Tølløse station in 2012

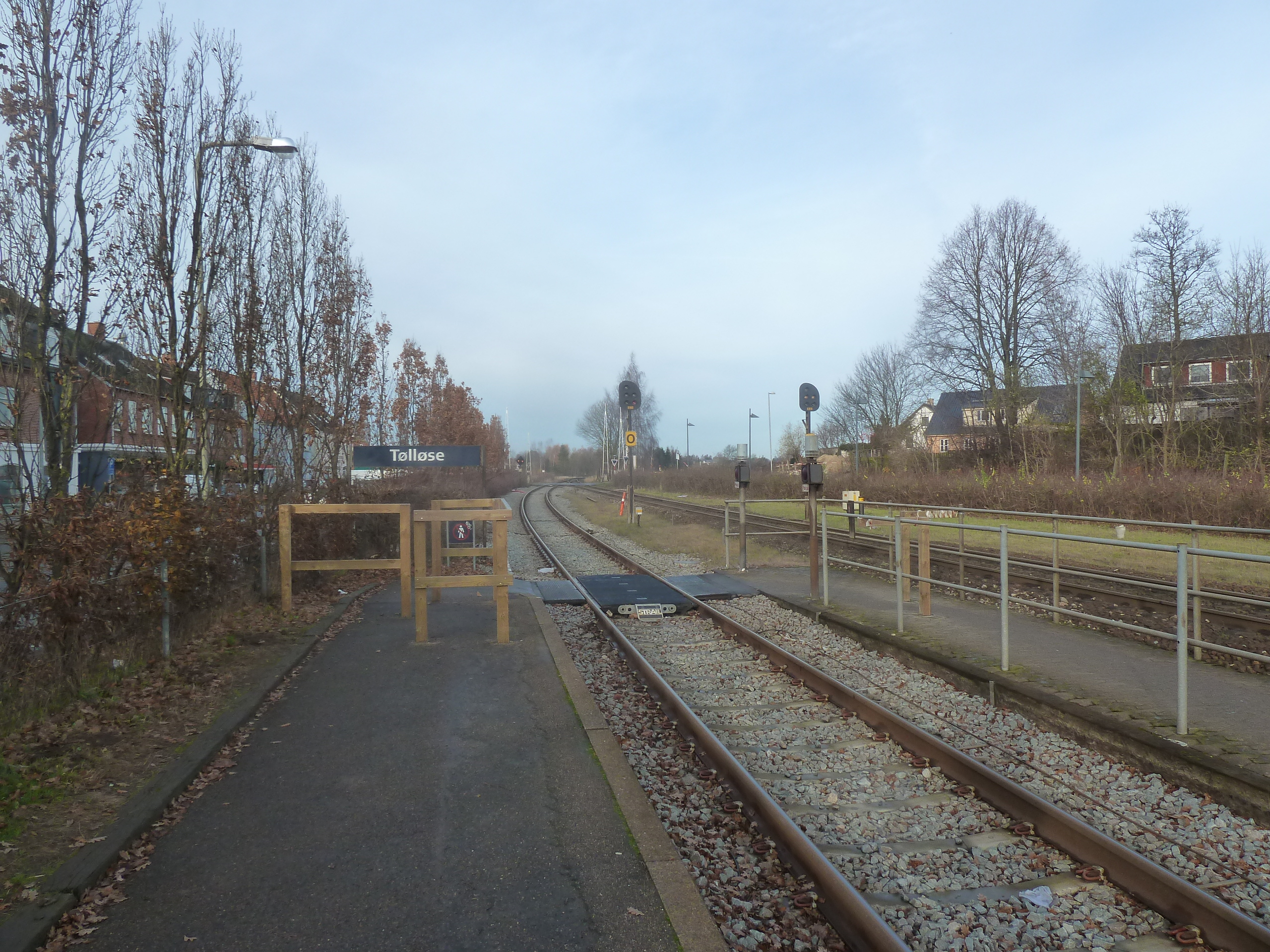
Tølløse station in 2012

== See also ==
- List of railway stations in Denmark
- Rail transport in Denmark
- History of rail transport in Denmark
