= Tølløse =

- town
- Location in Denmark Tølløse (Denmark Region Zealand)
- Coordinates: 55.61454°N 11.76446°E
- Country: Denmark
- Region: Zealand (Sjælland)
- Municipality: Holbæk

Area
  - Urban: 2.8 km^{2} (1.1 sq mi)

Population (2026)
  - Urban: 4,028
  - Urban density: 1,400/km^{2} (3,700/sq mi)
  - Gender: 1,940 males and 2,088 females
- Time zone: UTC+1 (CET)
  - Summer (DST): UTC+2 (CEST)
- Postal code: DK-4340 Tølløse

Tølløse is a railway town located in the northwestern part of the island of Zealand in Denmark. It has a population of 4,028 (1 January 2026).

The town is located in Holbæk Municipality in Region Zealand and was the municipal seat of the former Tølløse Municipality until 1 January 2007.

Tølløse is served by Tølløse railway station located on the railway line between Roskilde and Holbæk, and is the terminus of the railway line from Tølløse to Slagelse, operated by Lokaltog A/S.

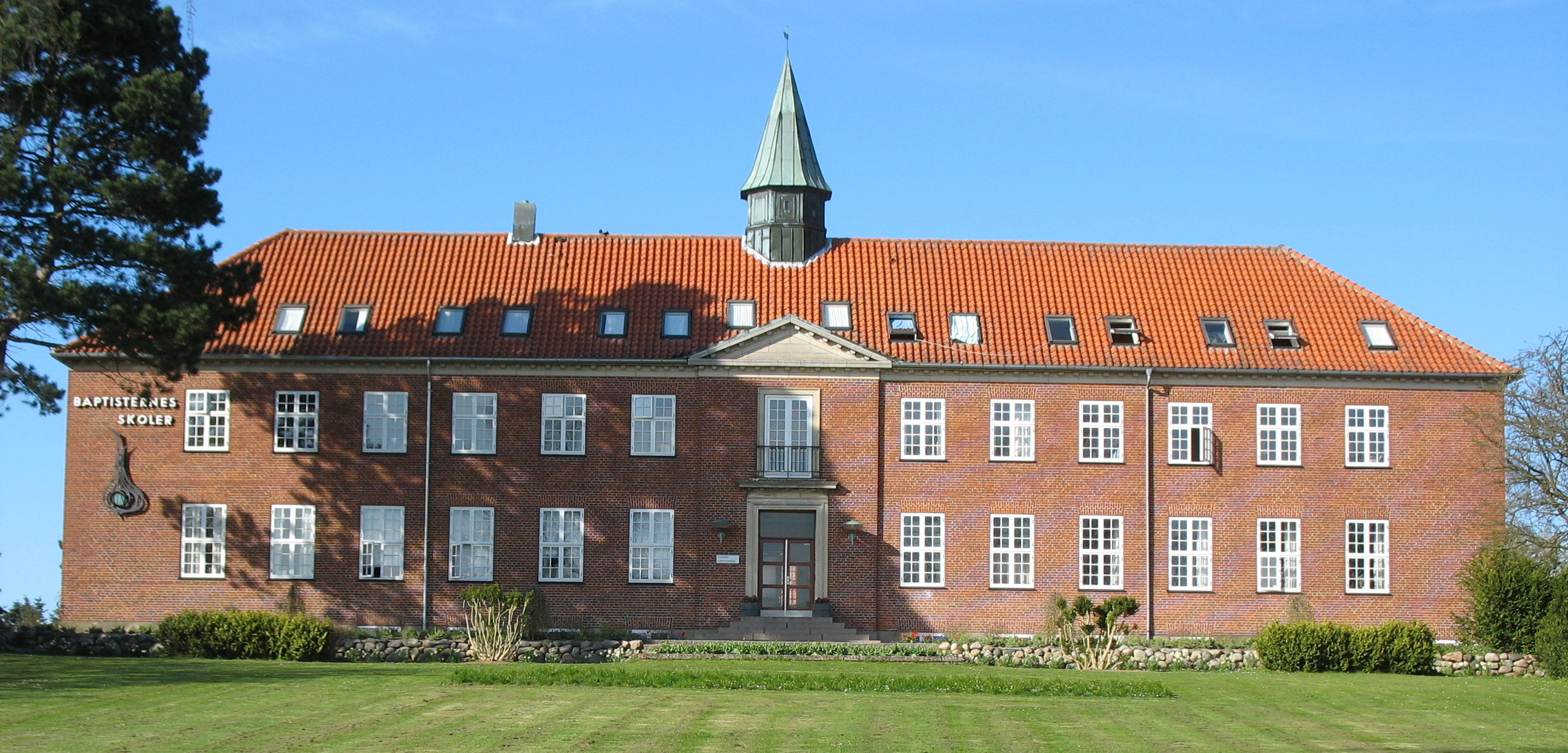
Tølløse Private School and Residential School (Baptist Schools). Kvarmløsevej 37, Tølløse.

Tølløse is known for the many schools in town. One public school (Tølløse Skole), two private schools (Tølløse Privat- og Efterskole, Sejergaardsskolen), and three boarding schools (efterskole) (Tølløse Slots Efterskole, Sejergaardens musikefterskole og Tølløse Privat- og Efterskole).

== Notable people ==
- Birgitte Gøye (1511–1574) a lady in waiting, landholder, noble and County administrator of Tølløse until 1566
- Christian Detlev, Count von Reventlow (1671–1738 in Tølløse Castle) a Danish military leader and diplomat
- Peter Johansen Neergaard (1769 in Tølløsegård – 1835) a Danish landowner
- Michael Rasmussen (born 1974 in Tølløse) controversial retired Danish professional cyclist who competed in road racing and mountain biking.
- Thomas Bruun Eriksen (born 1979 in Tølløse) a Danish professional road bicycle racer and sometime resident of Tølløse
- John Axelsen (born 1998 in Holbæk) a Danish amateur golfer, lives in Tølløse
- Mads Pedersen (born in 1995 in Tølløse) Danish professional cyclist, first ever Danish UCI road world champion in 2019
