= List of shipwrecks in 2017 =

The list of shipwrecks in 2017 includes ships sunk, foundered, grounded, or otherwise lost during 2017.

table of contents
2017
Jan	Feb	Mar	Apr
May	Jun	Jul	Aug
Sep	Oct	Nov	Dec

== January ==
=== 1 January ===
List of shipwrecks: 1 January 2017
Ship	State	Description
Zahro Express	Indonesia	The ferry caught fire off Jakarta with the loss of 23 lives. One hundred and ninety-four people were rescued, with seventeen reported missing.

=== 2 January ===
List of shipwrecks: 2 January 2017
Ship	State	Description
Mengah Scorpion	Indonesia	The coaster foundered in Sabang Bay off Pulang Island.

=== 7 January ===
List of shipwrecks: 7 January 2017
Ship	State	Description
Star King	United States	The fishing vessel capsized and sank after experiencing water ingress off the entrance of the Columbia River near Warrenton, Oregon.

=== 8 January ===
List of shipwrecks: 8 January 2017
Ship	State	Description
Arca 1	Panama	The coastal tanker ran aground off Sydney, Nova Scotia, Canada. Her six crew were evacuated. She was refloated on 16 January and taken in to Sydney.

=== 10 January ===
List of shipwrecks: 10 January 2017
Ship	State	Description
Stella Cherise	Singapore	The bulk carrier was run into by Spartacus (United Kingdom) at Shanghai, China and was severely damaged.

=== 11 January ===
List of shipwrecks: 11 January 2017
Ship	State	Description
Chong Gen	North Korea	The cargo ship capsized and in the East China Sea 30 nautical miles (56 km) south west of Fukue Island, Japan. Her crew were rescued by a Japan Coast Guard vessel.
Esi Winner	Moldova	The arrested and crewless cargo ship was driven ashore at Bozburun, Turkey.

=== 13 January ===
List of shipwrecks: 13 January 2017
Ship	State	Description
Sigma	Liberia	The cargo ship was driven ashore at Livorno, Italy. Her eighteen crew were rescued by helicopter.
Unknown tugboat	Thailand	The tug was flooded by wakes of passing boats causing her to capsize and sink at Bangkok, Thailand on the Chao Phraya River. The vessel was scheduled to be raised. The owner and a passenger survived.

=== 14 January ===
List of shipwrecks: 14 January 2017
Ship	State	Description
Fluvius Tamar	Barbados	The cargo ship foundered in the North Sea 30 nautical miles (56 km) off Ramsgate, Kent, United Kingdom. All seven crew were rescued, four by Norstream (Finland) and three by helicopter. She was on a voyage from Eemshaven, Groningen, Netherlands to Pasajes, Spain.

=== 17 January ===
List of shipwrecks: 17 January 2017
Ship	State	Description
Meridian Tres	Philippines	The ship foundered off Bohol. One of her 29 crew was reported missing. She was on a voyage from Cebu City to Tacloban City.
Virginia 1	Philippines	The cargo ship caught fire and sank south west of Caballo Island, Philippines with the loss of one of her eleven crew. Five crew were reported missing. She was on a voyage from Roxas to Binondo.

=== 20 January ===
List of shipwrecks: 20 January 2017
Ship	State	Description
Kraken	Vanuatu	The cargo ship was scuttled in 140 feet (43 m) of water in the Gulf of Mexico 67 nautical miles (124 km; 77 mi) off Galveston, Texas, to form an artificial reef.

=== 26 January ===
List of shipwrecks: 26 January 2017
Ship	State	Description
Fisktrans	Norway	The live fish carrier suffered rudder failure and foundered in the Norwegian Sea off Steigen, Norway. Her six crew were rescued by a Sea King helicopter from No. 330 Squadron RNoAF.
MCL Power III	Malaysia	The tug was driven ashore and beached at Kandis, Sarawak.

=== 27 January ===
List of shipwrecks: 27 January 2017
Ship	State	Description
Bereket	Turkey	The ship sprang a leak and sank in the Sea of Marmara off Istanbul.
Moana Nui	Cook Islands	The ro-ro cargo ship ran aground off Nassau and was abandoned.

=== 28 January ===
List of shipwrecks: 28 January 2017
Ship	State	Description
Unnamed catamaran	Malaysia	2017 Mengalum boat mishap: The catamaran sank in the South China Sea off Mengalum Island, on its way to the island from Kota Kinabalu, Sabah. Three passengers died from drowning with five others missing.

=== 31 January ===
List of shipwrecks: 31 January 2017
Ship	State	Description
USS Antietam	United States Navy	The Ticonderoga-class cruiser ran aground and was damaged in Tokyo Bay off Yokosuka, Japan.
Yeruslan	Cambodia	The arrested cargo ship was set afire by looters in Amur Bay, Russia, and was gutted.

== February ==
=== 3 February ===
List of shipwrecks: 3 February 2017
Ship	State	Description
Abbay	Ethiopia	The cargo ship was driven ashore at Sharjah or Umm Al Quwain, United Arab Emirates. Her crew were rescued.

=== 7 February ===
List of shipwrecks: 7 February 2017
Ship	State	Description
Aram Manis	Singapore	The bulk carrier ran aground on the Cargados Carajos Shoals. She was on a voyage from Richards Bay to Pipiya, India.

=== 11 February ===
List of shipwrecks: 11 February 2017
Ship	State	Description
Destination	United States	Overloaded and made top-heavy by icing, the 92-foot (28.0 m) crab-fishing boat capsized and sank rapidly in the Bering Sea off Dalnoi Point on the coast of St. George Island in the Pribilof Islands. Her entire crew of six men perished, and their bodies were never found. The National Oceanic and Atmospheric Administration research ship NOAAS Fairweather (United States) discovered her wreck in about 250 feet (76 m) of water during operations on 8 and 9 July 2017.
Sagan	Panama	The tanker was driven ashore on Suwanosejima, Japan. Her eighteen crew were rescued by a Japan Coast Guard helicopter.

=== 13 February ===
List of shipwrecks: 13 February 2017
Ship	State	Description
APL Austria	Liberia	The container ship caught fire 30 nautical miles (56 km) off Cape St. Francis, South Africa. Four non-essential crew were evacuated, and the ship put into Ngqura to enable firefighting operations to be completed. Her remaining crew were evacuated on arrival at Ngqura.
Predator	United States	Predator aground The fishing vessel ran aground on the coast of Akutan Island in the Aleutian Islands near Akutan, Alaska. A United States Coast Guard Sikorsky MH-60 Jayhawk helicopter rescued her entire crew of three.

=== 16 February ===
List of shipwrecks: 16 February 2017
Ship	State	Description
Saint Elias	United States	While under tow by the tug Salmson Mariner (United States), the 322-foot (98.1 m) barge ran hard aground on the northeast end of Gravina Island in the Alexander Archipelago in Southeast Alaska near Ketchikan, Alaska.She later was refloated.
Salmson Mariner	United States	While towing the barge Saint Elias (United States), the 30-meter (98-foot) tug ran hard aground on the northeast end of Gravina Island in the Alexander Archipelago in Southeast Alaska near Ketchikan, Alaska.She later was refloated.

=== 17 February ===
List of shipwrecks: 17 February 2017
Ship	State	Description
Chuki 1	China	The tanker was damaged by fire at Nanjing.

=== 21 February ===
List of shipwrecks: 21 February 2017
Ship	State	Description
Bellatrix	Togo	The cargo ship ran aground on Lesvos, Greece and was holed.

=== 23 February ===
List of shipwrecks: 23 February 2017
Ship	State	Description
Isla Bartolome	Ecuador	The cargo ship ran aground and partially sank off Isla Puna. She was on a voyage from Guayaquil to the Galapagos Islands.

=== 24 February ===
List of shipwrecks: 24 February 2017
Ship	State	Description
Honor	United States	The car carrier was severely damaged by fire whilst on a voyage from Southampton, Hampshire, United Kingdom to Baltimore, Maryland.

=== 25 February ===
List of shipwrecks: 25 February 2017
Ship	State	Description
Sternö	Sweden	The cargo ship ran aground and partially sank in the river Göta älv in Sweden.

== March ==
=== 1 March ===
List of shipwrecks: 1 March 2017
Ship	State	Description
Ocean Eagle	United States	Ocean Eagle and her barge aground. While towing a barge through Sumner Strait in the Alexander Archipelago in Southeast Alaska, the 102-foot (31 m) tug ran aground on Mariposa Reef (56.3811°N 133.6983°W) near Sitka, Alaska, and was holed. The barge ran aground as well. A United States Coast Guard Sikorsky MH-60 Jayhawk helicopter rescued her entire crew of five. She and the barge were refloated on 2 March.

=== 3 March ===
List of shipwrecks: 3 March 2017
Ship	State	Description
FFS Achilles	Norway	The tug ran aground and sank off Farsund, Norway. Her three crew survived, and the wreck was raised thirteen days later.
Persia II	Saint Vincent and the Grenadines	The coaster sprang a leak and foundered 8 nautical miles (15 km) south of Grenada. Her nine crew were rescued.
Ocean Way	Shetland	The trawler's starboard net came fast on an obstruction on the seabed. In the attempt to recover the fishing gear, the port trawl door struck the hull causing the aft compartment to flood. Despite efforts from the crew to pump the water out using their own portable pumps, a pump from Gerda Sæle the Lerwick Lifeboat, the ship foundered. All five crew were rescued onto the lifeboat at the scene.

=== 4 March ===
List of shipwrecks: 4 March 2017
Ship	State	Description
Caledonian Sky	Bahamas	The Noble Caledonia cruise ship grounded on a coral reef at Waigeo Island, Indonesia. With the help of a tug Caledonian Sky refloated, further damaging the reef.
Hero	United States	The research vessel sank at Bay Center, Washington.

=== 5 March ===
List of shipwrecks: 5 March 2017
Ship	State	Description
Anna	Togo	The cargo ship foundered in the Mediterranean Sea 50 nautical miles (93 km) north east of Misrata, Libya. Her ten crew were rescued by Da Ji (China). Anna was on a voyage from Istanbul, Turkey to Misrata.

=== 9 March ===
List of shipwrecks: 9 March 2017
Ship	State	Description
Kum San	North Korea	The cargo ship was hit by a Chinese tanker whilst at anchor and foundered off Lianyuanhang, China. Her 27 crew were rescued.

=== 14 March ===
List of shipwrecks: 14 March 2017
Ship	State	Description
Jin Hang Hai 6	China	The cargo ship collided with Chang Xun 17 (China) and sank in the Yangtze River at Nantong. Two of her thirteen crew were killed, four were reported missing.

=== 13–16 March ===
List of shipwrecks: 16 March 2017
Ship	State	Description
Cai Jun 3	Panama	The dredger last received position was on 13 March (UTC +8). It capsized and subsequently sank in Singapore's Territorial Waters, off Horsburgh Lighthouse Area.

=== 16 March ===
List of shipwrecks: 16 March 2017
Ship	State	Description
Tinaztepe S	Turkey	The cargo ship sank at Misrata, Libya. Four of her thirteen crew were killed, two were reported missing. There were seven survivors.

=== 19 March ===
List of shipwrecks: 19 March 2017
Ship	State	Description
Xing Long Zhou 569	China	The tanker exploded and caught fire in the East China Sea 90 nautical miles (170 km) south of Shindao Island with the loss of three of her sixteen crew. She was later towed in to Shindao.

=== 21 March ===
List of shipwrecks: 21 March 2017
Ship	State	Description
Marc Jason III	Philippines	The landing craft tank capsized and sank off Malabuyoc.

=== 24 March ===
List of shipwrecks: 24 March 2017
Ship	State	Description
Lyric Poet	Bahamas	The bulk carrier ran aground 50 nautical miles (93 km) north of Pulau Belitung Island, Malaysia. She was refloated on 10 May.
Soby	Cape Verde	The ro-ro ferry capsized at Mindelo, São Vincente Island.
Unknown	None	Two boats carrying refugees and migrants capsized in the Mediterranean Sea. At least 240 people were presumed dead.

=== 28 March ===
List of shipwrecks: 28 March 2017
Ship	State	Description
Hai Thanh 26	Vietnam	The cargo ship collided with Petrolimex 14 (Vietnam) and foundered 44 nautical miles (81 km) off Vung Tau. Nine of her eleven crew were killed. Two crew were rescued by Petrolimex 14.

=== 31 March ===
List of shipwrecks: 31 March 2017
Ship	State	Description
Stellar Daisy	Marshall Islands	The cargo ship broke in half and sank in the Atlantic Ocean 1,800 miles (2,900 km) west of Cape Town, South Africa. 2 crewmen rescued, 22 crewmembers missing.

== April ==
=== 6 April ===
List of shipwrecks: 6 April 2017
Ship	State	Description
Xiang Zhou	Kiribati	The cargo ship collided with a lighter, capsized and sank in the Yangtze off Nantong. Twelve crew were reported missing.

=== 7 April ===
List of shipwrecks: 7 April 2017
Ship	State	Description
KAI Shiuan No.3	Taiwan	The catamaran passenger vessel ran aground in the Taiwan Strait and was damaged. All 346 passengers were evacuated by the Taiwan Coast Guard.

=== 8 April ===
List of shipwrecks: 8 April 2017
Ship	State	Description
Bhaita Jaya Samudra	Indonesia	The cargo ship collided with Elizabeth (Indonesia) and sank off Damar Island.
Kure Harbour	Panama	The vessel was driven aground by high winds on a shoal off Argentia, Newfoundland and Labrador. The vessel was freed the next day.

=== 9 April ===
List of shipwrecks: 9 April 2017
Ship	State	Description
Mutiara Persada III	Indonesia	The ferry caught fire in the Sunda Strait. All 113 passengers and crew were evacuated.

=== 10 April ===
List of shipwrecks: 10 April 2017
Ship	State	Description
Ngwe Kyal Pwint	Burma	The passenger vessel collided with a cargo ship and sank in the Pathein Taman Creek with the loss of 20 of the 60 passengers on board.

=== 12 April ===
List of shipwrecks: 12 April 2017
Ship	State	Description
Alex	Belgium	The tanker ran aground between Borneo and Sumatra.

=== 17 April ===
List of shipwrecks: 17 April 2017
Ship	State	Description
Todd Brown	United States	The tugboat collided with barges she was maneuvering in the Mississippi River causing her to swamp and sink at Mile Marker 940 near Columbus, Kentucky. Raised on 22 April.

=== 18 April ===
List of shipwrecks: 18 April 2017
Ship	State	Description
Aegir	Chile	The cargo ship was damaged in the Chacabuco Canal and was beached on Isla Humos.
Sevilla Knutsen	Spain	The LNG tanker ran aground on a reef south of Guam and was severely damaged. She was refloated and made for the Philippines.

=== 19 April ===
List of shipwrecks: 19 April 2017
Ship	State	Description
Geroi Arsenala	Panama	The cargo ship broke in two in stormy weather and sank in the Black Sea's Kerch Strait. As of 19 April, one member of the ship's 12-strong crew had been rescued and the bodies of two others retrieved from the sea.
Powhatan	United States	The laid up tug sank while moored in Starrigavan Bay near Sitka, Alaska. Salvage of the tug was completed on 12 June 2017. She was scrapped at Seattle, Washington later that year.

=== 20 April ===
List of shipwrecks: 20 April 2017
Ship	State	Description
3062	China Marine Police	The ship collided with Yue Dian 57 (China) and sank in the Lingding Channel off Guangzhou. Her eight crew were rescued.
Powhatan	United States	The 30-metre (98 ft) tug sank in 15 metres (49 ft) of water at her berth in Starrigavan Bay (57.1362°N 135.3811°W) near Sitka, Alaska. She later slid into deeper water, settling in 60 metres (200 ft) of water.

=== 21 April ===
List of shipwrecks: 21 April 2017
Ship	State	Description
Panagia Parou	Malta	The ferry was driven against the quayside and damaged at Algeciras, Spain. The vessel was holed; she sank by the stern and later capsized onto her port side.

=== 23 April ===
List of shipwrecks: 23 April 2017
Ship	State	Description
Nabil J	Sierra Leone	The cargo ship was driven ashore at Saida, Lebanon.

=== 27 April ===
List of shipwrecks: 27 April 2017
Ship	State	Description
Hordafor V	Norway	The chemical tanker was in a floating drydock which capsized at the Nauta shipyard, Gdynia, Poland.
Liman	Russian Navy	The military intelligence vessel sank in the Black Sea off the Turkish coast, 25 miles (40 km) northwest of the Bosphorus Strait, after a collision in fog with the livestock carrier Youzarsif H (Togo). The crew of 78 were evacuated.

== May ==
=== 1 May ===
List of shipwrecks: 1 May 2017
Ship	State	Description
Siebengebirge	Germany	The ferry capsized and sank in the North Sea west of Texel, North Holland, Netherlands whilst under tow. Nobody was on board at the time.

=== 6 May ===
List of shipwrecks: 6 May 2017
Ship	State	Description
Southern Phoenix	Panama	The cargo ship capsized and sank at Suva, Fiji, caused by problem with wing ballasting and fuel bunkering.

=== 7 May ===
List of shipwrecks: 7 May 2017
Ship	State	Description
Fortuner	Philippines	The cargo ship suffered a structural failure of her hull and foundered off Talisay City, Cebu, Philippines. Her 22 crew were rescued.

=== 8 May ===
List of shipwrecks: 8 May 2017
Ship	State	Description
Uruguay Reefer	Panama	The refrigerated cargo ship was holed by ice in the South Atlantic and was abandoned off the Falkland Islands. Her 42 crew were rescued by Taganrogskiy Zaliv (Panama).
Unknown	None	A boat carrying refugees and migrant from Libya to Italy sank in the Mediterranean Sea. Approximately 80 people died; around 40 survivors were rescued by an Italian coast guard ship and taken to the port of Pozzallo, Italy.

=== 10 May ===
List of shipwrecks: 10 May 2017
Ship	State	Description
USCGC Tamaroa	United States Coast Guard	The decommissioned United States Coast Guard Cutter was scuttled in the Atlantic Ocean 33 nautical miles (61 km) off Cape May, New Jersey, at 38°31.144′N 074°30.747′W to form an artificial reef.

=== 14 May ===
List of shipwrecks: 14 May 2017
Ship	State	Description
Ebrahim 1	Palau	The tanker exploded, caught fire and broke in two at Al Hamriyah, United Arab Emirates. One of her crew was killed and four were injured.

=== 15 May ===
List of shipwrecks: 15 May 2017
Ship	State	Description
Ali Aga	Turkey	The cargo ship capsized and sank at Celebi Bandırma, Turkey due to being loaded incorrectly. Twelve people were injured.

=== 19 May ===
List of shipwrecks: 19 May 2017
Ship	State	Description
Mutiara Sentosa 1	Indonesia	The ro-pax ferry caught fire off East Java. Five people were killed, 192 people were rescued by the National Search and Rescue Agency.

=== 24 May ===
List of shipwrecks: 24 May 2017
Ship	State	Description
Unknown	None	A ship carrying around 200 migrants capsized in the Mediterranean Sea. At least 34 people died.

=== 29 May ===
List of shipwrecks: 29 May 2017
Ship	State	Description
Xingyun 789	China	The cargo ship broke in two and sank in Bohai Bay. Her five crew were rescued.

=== 30 May ===
List of shipwrecks: 30 May 2017
Ship	State	Description
Crosby Commander	United States	The tug capsized and sank in the Gulf of Mexico 30 nautical miles (56 km) off the coast of Louisiana. A crew member was reported missing. The survivors were rescued by Andi Nicol (United States).
Fisherman's Dream	United States	The retired 87-foot (26.5 m) fishing trawler was scuttled as an artificial reef in the North Atlantic Ocean off Townsends Inlet, New Jersey, in 60 feet (18.3 m) of water at 39°06.500′N 074°36.300′W.

== June ==
=== 3 June ===
List of shipwrecks: xx May 2017
Ship	State	Description
KD Rahmat	Royal Malaysian Navy	The frigate sank at Lumit.

=== 5 June ===
List of shipwrecks: 5 June 2017
Ship	State	Description
Ibis	Belize	The dredging barge sank in shallow water off Mangaluru, India. Her 27 crew were evacuated by the Indian Coast Guard.
Sheba	Bangladesh	The ship suffered a hull failure and foundered in the Pashur River near Bagherat. Her nine crew were rescued.

=== 6 June ===
List of shipwrecks: 6 June 2017
Ship	State	Description
Argent Cosmos	Panama	Argent Cosmos aground. During a voyage from Longview, Washington, to China with a cargo of 1.63 million gallons (6,170,221 litres) of ethanol, 6.65 million U.S. gallons (25,172,988 litres) of monoethylene glycol, 458,074 gallons (1,733,999 litres) of high-sulfur oil, and 99,064 gallons (374,998 litres) of low-sulfur oil, the 557-foot (169.8 m), 33,609 DWT tanker ran aground in the Columbia River near Skamokawa, Washington.

=== 8 June ===
List of shipwrecks: 8 June 2017
Ship	State	Description
St. Gregory	Bahamas	The bulk carrier ran aground at Kokkala, East Mani, Greece. She was on a voyage from Istanbul, Turkey to Sfax, Tunisia. St. Gregory was refloated on 21 June.

=== 10 June ===
List of shipwrecks: 10 June 2017
Ship	State	Description
Chemroad Journey	Cayman Islands	The chemical tanker ran aground in the South China Sea 28 nautical miles (52 km) south of Phu Quy Island, Vietnam and was holed. Her 26 crew were rescued. She was refloated on 4 July.

=== 12 June ===
List of shipwrecks: 12 June 2017
Ship	State	Description
USS Texas	United States Navy	The New York-class battleship sprang a leak and developed a list at Houston, Texas.

=== 14 June ===
List of shipwrecks: 14 June 2017
Ship	State	Description
Amelia 1	Indonesia	The LPG tanker was damaged by fire at Makassar.
KM Avatar	Indonesia	The cargo ship sank in the Malacca Strait. Two of her fifteen crew were reported missing. Survivors were rescued by Undine (Sweden). The missing crew were found in their liferaft on 15 June, but one of them was deceased.
Kutai Reya Dua	Indonesia	The bulk carrier was driven ashore on Pulau Buru, Indonesia.

=== 15 June ===
List of shipwrecks: 15 June 2017
Ship	State	Description
Med Star	Greece	The ferry caught fire in the Ionian Sea off Rhodes and was severely damaged. Twenty of the 32 people on board were reported to have been evacuated. Declared uneconomic to repair. she was scrapped.
Aquarius or Putri Sea	Equatorial Guinea	The tanker exploded and sank 4.6 nautical miles (8.5 km) north west of Tanjung Pengelih, Malaysia. Six crew were reported missing.

=== 16 June ===
List of shipwrecks: 16 June 2017
Ship	State	Description
Damia Desgagnés	Canada	The tanker lost power and ran aground 3 nmi (5.6 km; 3.5 mi) east of Iroquois, Ontario in the Saint Lawrence Seaway. No damage to the ship and no loss of life or injury.

=== 17 June ===
List of shipwrecks: 17 June 2017
Ship	State	Description
USS Fitzgerald	United States Navy	USS Fitzgerald after the collision USS Fitzgerald and MV ACX Crystal collision: The Arleigh Burke-class destroyer was in collision with ACX Crystal (Philippines) 56 nautical miles (104 km) south west of Yokosuka, Japan. Seven crew were killed.

List of shipwrecks: 17 June 2017
Ship	State	Description
Repunte	Argentina	Sinking of fishing vessel in the middle of a strong winter storm off the coast of the province of Chubut. Ten fishermen died.

=== 18 June ===
List of shipwrecks: 18 June 2017
Ship	State	Description
Alabama	United States	The schooner ran aground at the mouth of the Mystic River. Her seventeen passengers were taken off by a United States Coast Guard rescued boat.

=== 20 June ===
List of shipwrecks: 20 June 2017
Ship	State	Description
Theresa Arctic	Tuvalu	The tanker ran aground off Kilifi, Kenya. She was refloated on 12 July and taken into Mombasa, Kenya.

=== 21 June ===
List of shipwrecks: 21 June 2017
Ship	State	Description
Flevoborg	Netherlands	The cargo ship ran aground off Sainte-Croix, Quebec in the Saint Lawrence Seaway after the vessel's engines stopped. No one was hurt and the vessel was towed to Quebec City.

=== 24 June ===
List of shipwrecks: 24 June 2017
Ship	State	Description
Ocean Phoenix	Singapore	The bulk carrier was in collision with Green Phoenix (Panama) and ran aground off Chittagong, India.
Tiss	Moldova	The cargo ship partially sank at Catania, Italy.

=== 25 June ===
List of shipwrecks: 25 June 2017
Ship	State	Description
El Almirante	Colombia	The passenger ship sank in the Peñol-Guatapé Reservoir, Guatapé with the loss of nine lives.

=== 26 June ===
List of shipwrecks: 26 June 2017
Ship	State	Description
Rama 2	Panama	The tanker capsized and sank in the Gulf of Aden (13°50′N 55°53′E) with the loss of one of her fourteen crew. Survivors were rescued by Sea Power (Marshall Islands), Soyo (Bahamas) and Tortola (Singapore). She was on a voyage from Mogadishu, Somalia to Al Hamriyah, United Arab Emirates.

=== 27 June ===
List of shipwrecks: 27 June 2017
Ship	State	Description
Mt. Sinai	United States	The retired 87-foot (26.5 m) fishing trawler was scuttled as an artificial reef in the North Atlantic Ocean off Point Pleasant Beach, New Jersey, in 75 feet (23 m) of water at 40°04.980′N 073°59.410′W.

=== 28 June ===
List of shipwrecks: 28 June 2017
Ship	State	Description
Freyja	Malta	The 77-metre (253 ft), 2,091 DWT oil products tanker, in ballast, ran aground at Svartskjæret off Florø, Norway. Tugs pulled her free on 29 June.

=== 29 June ===
List of shipwrecks: 29 June 2017
Ship	State	Description
Mallika Naree	Thailand	While arriving at Norfolk, Virginia, at the end of a voyage from France with a cargo of cement and steel, the 179-metre (587 ft) 30,195-dwt bulk carrier ran aground in the Elizabeth River. Tugs pulled her free a few hours later.
Miss Johanna Betsey	Jamaica	The coaster was presumed to have foundered off the coast of Nicaragua with the loss of all thirteen crew.

== July ==
=== 2 July ===
List of shipwrecks: 2 July 2017
Ship	State	Description
Deceptive C	United States	Deceptive C aground. The fishing vessel ran hard aground in the Stikine Strait in the Alexander Archipelago in Southeast Alaska near Wrangell, Alaska.

=== 3 July ===
List of shipwrecks: 3 July 2017
Ship	State	Description
Xinbaotai 1	China	The cargo ship ran aground on Weizhou Island and sank. Her crew survived.

=== 9 July ===
List of shipwrecks: 9 July 2017
Ship	State	Description
Eric Haney	United States	Eric Haney. The 48-metre (157 ft) towboat sank in the Mississippi River near Cairo, Illinois. Her crew of nine survived.

=== 12 July ===
List of shipwrecks: 12 July 2017
Ship	State	Description
Kea Trader	Malta	The container ship ran aground on the Durand Reef, 54 nautical miles (100 km) off Maré, New Caledonia. Her crew were evacuated in the week before 24 August. She was declared a constructive total loss. The ship broke in two over the weekend of 11–12 November.

=== 14 July ===
List of shipwrecks: 14 July 2017
Ship	State	Description
Jia Yuan 9	China	The cargo ship was severely damaged by fire in the Pearl River. Her six crew were rescued.

=== 15 July ===
List of shipwrecks: 15 July 2017
Ship	State	Description
KM Madani Nusantara	Indonesia	The ferry ran aground between Kalimantan Island and Suwangi Island and was abandoned.

=== 17 July ===
List of shipwrecks: 17 July 2017
Ship	State	Description
Thai Ha 26	Vietnam	Tropical Storm Talas: The cargo ship was driven ashore at Cua Lo.
Truong Than	Vietnam	Tropical Storm Talas: The cargo ship was driven ashore at Cua Lo.
VTB 26	Vietnam	Tropical Storm Talas: The cargo ship capsized and sank in the Gulf of Tonkin off Cua Lo with the loss of three of her thirteen crew. Three others were reported missing, seven were rescued.

=== 20 July ===
List of shipwrecks: 20 July 2017
Ship	State	Description
ITT Panther	India	The cargo ship foundered 200 nautical miles (370 km) off Port Blair, Andaman and Nicobar Islands. Her eleven crew were rescued by ICGS Rajkamal (Indian Coast Guard). She subsequently capsized and sank.

=== 21 July ===
List of shipwrecks: 21 July 2017
Ship	State	Description
Fugang 1	China	The cargo ship foundered in the Bohai Sea (38°18′N 118°02′E). Her crew were rescued by the tugs Bin Hai 261 and Hai Yang Shin You 615 (both China).

=== 23 July ===
List of shipwrecks: 23 July 2017
Ship	State	Description
Nan Hui 68	China	Typhoon Roke: The cargo ship capsized and foundered off Huidong. Her twelve crew were rescued by Chinese Coast Guard helicopter.

=== 26 July ===
List of shipwrecks: 26 July 2017
Ship	State	Description
Melite	Marshall Islands	The cargo ship ran aground off Pulau Laut, Indonesia. She was consequently sold for scrapping.

=== 29 July ===
List of shipwrecks: 29 July 2017
Ship	State	Description
Anda	Togo	The cargo ship capsized and sank in the Black Sea off Sevastopol, Russia. Her nine crew were rescued. Anda was on a voyage from Kerch, Russia to Tripoli, Libya.

=== 31 July ===
List of shipwrecks: 31 July 2017
Ship	State	Description
Chonglunj 3010	China	The container ship collided with New Sailing 2 (China) in the Yangtze River and sank. Two of her fifteen crew were reported missing.
Xin Hang 868	China	The cargo ship foundered in the Taiwan Strait off Meizhou Island. Her seven crew were rescued by Dong Hai Jiu 111 (China) Xin Hang 868 was on a voyage from Hainan to Ningbo.

=== Unknown date ===
List of shipwrecks: Unknown date in July 2017
Ship	State	Description
MB 248	Russia	The tug sank in Nakhodka Bay during a towing operation. She had been raised by mid-October.

== August ==
=== 1 August ===
List of shipwrecks: 1 August 2017
Ship	State	Description
Xinenhui 008	China	The cargo ship capsized and sank at Shanghai. Her eight crew were reported missing.

=== 2 August ===
List of shipwrecks: 2 August 2017
Ship	State	Description
CXX	Brazil	The tug collided with Mercosul Santos (Brazil) and sank near Óbidos, Brazil with the loss of eleven of the thirteen people on board.

=== 5 August ===
List of shipwrecks: 5 August 2017
Ship	State	Description
Bahtera Sejati	Indonesia	The cargo ship sprang a leak and was beached at Tanjungwandi.

=== 6 August ===
List of shipwrecks: 6 August 2017
Ship	State	Description
Duc Cuong 06	Vietnam	The cargo ship foundered in the Gulf of Tonkin (19°16′N 105°51′E). Her ten crew were rescued by fishing vessels. She was on a voyage from Nghi Son to Ho Chi Minh City.

=== 11 August ===
List of shipwrecks: 11 August 2017
Ship	State	Description
UC3 Nautilus	Denmark	The midget submarine was scuttled in Køge Bay by the captain, Peter Madsen. This was related to the murder of Kim Wall.

=== 14 August ===
List of shipwrecks: 14 August 2017
Ship	State	Description
Cheshire	Isle of Man	The bulk carrier was evacuated 45 nautical miles (83 km) off Gran Canaria, Canary Islands after her cargo of ammonium nitrate became heated and gave off fumes. Authorities refused to allow the ship to enter port, fearing a repeat of the Texas City Disaster in 1947. On 17 August, an explosion and fire occurred. Cheshire was taken under tow on 21 August. She arrived at Motril, Spain on 13 September and scrapped.

=== 15 August ===
List of shipwrecks: xx August 2017
Ship	State	Description
RFA Fort Austin	Royal Navy	The Fort Rosalie-class replenishment ship caught fire at Birkenhead. Her 60 crew were evacuated.

=== 18 August ===
List of shipwrecks: 118 August 2017
Ship	State	Description
Ikra	Turkey	The cargo ship sprang a leak off Iskenderun. Her ten crew were rescued by the Turkish Coast Guard. She was on a voyage from Iskenderun to Antalya. Ikra was subsequently towed back to Iskenderun by the tug Ekinciler Port (Turkey) and beached.

=== 19 August ===
List of shipwrecks: 19 August 2017
Ship	State	Description
Xing Dong Yuan	China	The cargo ship collided with another vessel and sank in the Taiwan Strait off Pintang Island. Four of her fourteen crew were rescued, nine were killed and one was listed as missing.

=== 20 August ===
List of shipwrecks: 20 August 2017
Ship	State	Description
Al-Misbar	Iraq	The service vessel collided with Royal Arsenal (Saint Vincent and the Grenadines) and sank off Um Qasr with the loss of 20 of her 31 crew.
Arama 1	Turkey	The research ship ran aground near Arsuz and was damaged. Accident may have been the day before.

=== 21 August ===
List of shipwrecks: 21 August 2017
Ship	State	Description
USS John S. McCain	United States Navy	Damage sustained by USS John S. McCain The Arleigh Burke-class destroyer collided with Alnic MC (Liberia) off the coast of Singapore, east of the Strait of Malacca. Ten sailors were killed, five were injured.
Yangtze Harmony	Marshall Islands	The bulk carrier was abandoned in the South China Sea (10°25′N 110°30′E).

=== 22 August ===
List of shipwrecks: 22 August 2017
Ship	State	Description
Comandante Ribeiro	Brazil	The passenger ship sank in the Xingu River near Porto de Moz with the loss of at least ten lives.
Maersk Pembroke	Netherlands	The container ship caught fire in the Atlantic Ocean 125 nautical miles (232 km) south west of Ireland. She was consequently withdrawn from service and earmarked for scrapping.

=== 23 August ===
List of shipwrecks: 23 August 2017
Ship	State	Description
Gem No. 8	Taiwan	Typhoon Hato: The tanker was driven ashore in the Pearl River.
Rainbow Island 88	China	Typhoon Hato: The tanker broke in two at Hong Kong.
SE Panthea	Singapore	Typhoon Hato: The cargo ship was driven ashore at Hong Kong.
Viet Hai 06	Vietnam	The cargo ship foundered 3 nautical miles (5.6 km) off Ninh Chu. Her nine crew survived.
Yuhai 1	China	Typhoon Hato: The cargo ship was abandoned in Discovery Bay, Hong Kong.
Zhang Hong No.1	Taiwan	Typhoon Hato: The bulk carrier was driven ashore on an isle 27 nautical miles (50 km) southwest of Kowloon, China.

=== 25 August ===
List of shipwrecks: 25 August 2017
Ship	State	Description
Gulf Justice	United States	Hurricane Harvey: The offshore supply vessel ran aground at Port Mansfield, Texas. Her twelve crew were rescued by United States Coast Guard helicopters before she was blown ashore.

=== 26 August ===
List of shipwrecks: 26 August 2017
Ship	State	Description
Belle Chasse	United States	Hurricane Harvey: The tug sank in the Lydia Ann Channel near Port Aransas, Texas. Her eleven crew were rescued.
Bintang 28	Indonesia	The cargo ship was driven ashore at Sanana.
Paragon DPDS 1	United States	Hurricane Harvey: The 449-foot (137 m) drillship broke loose from her moorings. While adrift she sank one tug and damaged two others. She was driven aground in the ship channel at Port Aransas.
Sabine Pass	United States	Hurricane Harvey: The tug was abandoned at Port Aransas and was driven ashore. Her seven crew were rescued by United States Coast Guard helicopters.
Sandy Point	United States	Hurricane Harvey: The tug was abandoned at Port Aransas. Her four crew were rescued by the United States Coast Guard.
Signet Enterprise	United States	Hurricane Harvey: The 105-foot (32 m) tug was sunk at Port Aransas when Paragon DPDS 1 broke loose from her moorings. Her four crew were rescued by a United States Coast Guard helicopter.

=== 27 August ===
List of shipwrecks: 27 August 2017
Ship	State	Description
Leonardo	Mongolia	The cargo ship broke in two in the Black Sea off Kilyos, Turkey. Her eleven crew were rescued. The bow section sank, the stern section was towed ashore.

=== 29 August ===
List of shipwrecks: 29 August 2017
Ship	State	Description
La Nina	United States	The 75-foot (23 m) replica of Christopher Columbus's ship sank at dock in Corpus Christi, Texas from damage from Hurricane Harvey. Refloated on 4 December.
Star of Sawara	Panama	The cargo ship ran aground off Falster, Denmark (54°28′N 12°11′E).

=== 30 August ===
List of shipwrecks: 30 August 2017
Ship	State	Description
Blue Star Patmos	Greece	The ferry ran aground off Ios and was damaged. All 205 passengers were evacuated from the ship. Blue Star Patmos was refloated on 6 September.

== September ==
=== 1 September ===
List of shipwrecks: 1 September 2017
Ship	State	Description
Islas Malvinas	Argentine Navy	The patrol ship ran aground at Ushuaia.

=== 2 September ===
List of shipwrecks: 2 September 2017
Ship	State	Description
Reef Elaf	Tanzania	The cargo ship capsized and sank off Al-Labki, Oman. Her twenty crew were rescued.

=== 5 September ===
List of shipwrecks: 5 September 2017
Ship	State	Description
Savage Ingenuity	United States	The tug sank in the Intracoastal Waterway. Her crew were rescued.

=== 6 September ===
List of shipwrecks: 6 September 2017
Ship	State	Description
Hai Duong 09	Panama	The cargo ship listed severely against the quayside at Visakhapatnam, India.

=== 9 September ===
List of shipwrecks: 9 September 2017
Ship	State	Description
Randgrid	Bahamas	The tanker caught fire off Mekjarvik. One hundred and thirty-eight people were evacuated.

=== 10 September ===
List of shipwrecks: 10 September 2017
Ship	State	Description
Agia Zoni II	Greece	The tanker sank west of Piraeus. Both crew on board were rescued. She was raised between 24 and 29 November 2017.

=== 11 September ===
List of shipwrecks: 11 September 2017
Ship	State	Description
Kamaru	Indonesia	The cargo ship was driven onto a reef off Kalosot Island, in the Bali Sea. Her twelve crew were rescued.

=== 12 September ===
List of shipwrecks: 12 September 2017
Ship	State	Description
Helena Cora	Netherlands	The motor barge was beached at Vlissingen, Zeeland. Three of the four people on board were taken off by a pilot boat. She was on a voyage from Vlissingen to Antwerp, Belgium.

=== 13 September ===
List of shipwrecks: 13 September 2017
Ship	State	Description
JJB De Rong 19	Dominica	The dredger collided with Kartika Segara (Indonesia) and capsized off the Sisters' Islands, Singapore. Five of her twelve crew were killed.

=== 17 September ===
List of shipwrecks: 17 September 2017
Ship	State	Description
Fungka Permata III	Indonesia	The passenger ship foundered in the Banda Sea off Buton Selatan. All 27 people on board were rescued.

=== 20 September ===
List of shipwrecks: 20 September 2017
Ship	State	Description
Ferrel	United States	Hurricane Maria: The former research ship capsized with the loss of one of the four people on board. Survivors were rescued by a Royal Navy helicopter. She was subsequently driven ashore on Vieques Island, Puerto Rico.

=== 23 September ===
List of shipwrecks: 23 September 2017
Ship	State	Description
Atlantic	Faroe Islands	The cargo ship ran aground off Oskarshamn, Sweden. She was on a voyage from Visby to Oskarshamn. Atlantic was refloated on 27 September.

=== 25 September ===
List of shipwrecks: 25 September 2017
Ship	State	Description
Elefantas	Greece	The dredger sank at Athens.

=== 26 September ===
List of shipwrecks: 26 September 2017
Ship	State	Description
Maria Matilde	Philippines	The ro-ro ferry ran ashore on Tablas Island, injuring 87 of the 2,151 passengers on board. She was on a voyage from Odiongan to Romblon Island.

=== 29 September ===
List of shipwrecks: 29 September 2017
Ship	State	Description
Norton Bridge	United States	The ship was severely damaged by fire at San Diego, California.
Orkideh 1	Iran	The cargo ship was driven against the quayside and holed at Bandar Anzali.

=== 30 September ===
List of shipwrecks: 30 September 2017
Ship	State	Description
Roebuck Bay	(Australia) Australian Border Force	The Bay-class patrol boat ran aground on Henrys Reef and was severely damaged. She was later refloated and towed into Cairns, Queensland.

== October ==
=== 5 October ===
List of shipwrecks: 6 October 2017
Ship	State	Description
KM KTC 1	Indonesia	The cargo ship ran aground off Karang Jamuang Island and developed a severe list. Her twelve crew were rescued. She was on a voyage from Tanjung Perak to Pekanbaru.

=== 6 October ===
List of shipwrecks: 6 October 2017
Ship	State	Description
Goeast	Comoros	The tanker was intercepted 2 nautical miles (3.7 km) off the coast of Libya by a Libyan Coast Guard cutter. Having failed to stop when requested, she was fired upon and caught fire. She put into Malta on 16 October in a severely damaged condition.
Xin Fa Er Hao	Taiwan	The cargo ship foundered in the Taiwan Strait with the loss of all six crew.

=== 8 October ===
List of shipwrecks: 8 October 2017
Ship	State	Description
Fu Shun 67	China	The cargo ship capsized and sank in the Minjiang River at Fuzhou. Her ten crew were rescued.
Islay Trader	Antigua and Barbuda	The cargo ship was driven ashore at Margate, Kent, United Kingdom.

=== 10 October ===
List of shipwrecks: 10 October 2017
Ship	State	Description
Nieuw Amsterdam	Netherlands	The Signature-class cruise ship was driven ashore at Santa Cruz Huatulco, Mexico. Her passengers were evacuated. She was later refloated.
Ruyter	Netherlands	The cargo ship ran aground on Rathlin Island, County Donegal, Ireland. She was later refloated and resumed her voyage.

=== 13 October ===
List of shipwrecks: 13 October 2017
Ship	State	Description
Emerald Star	Hong Kong	The bulk carrier capsized and sank 150 nautical miles (280 km) east of the northern tip of the Philippines with the loss of eleven of her 26 crew.
Lienhe 36	Taiwan	Typhoon Khanun: The cargo ship was driven ashore near Changhuaim. Her six crew survived. She caught fire on 15 October and was declared a total loss.

=== 14 October ===
List of shipwrecks: 14 October 2017
Ship	State	Description
Harvest Sky	Panama	The bulk carrier ran aground off Taoyuan City, Taiwan. She was refloated on 20 July with assistance from the salvage tug Koyo Maru (Japan).

=== 15 October ===
List of shipwrecks: 15 October 2017
Ship	State	Description
Oliver Hazard Perry	United States	The full-rigged ship ran aground at Newport Harbor, Rhode Island.

=== 16 October ===
List of shipwrecks: 16 October 2017
Ship	State	Description
Quan Hai 88	China	The cargo ship ran aground in the Taiwan Strait off Quangzhou and was abandoned by her sixteen crew.

=== 18 October ===
List of shipwrecks: 18 October 2017
Ship	State	Description
Ming An	Honduras	The cargo ship foundered in the Taiwan Strait 36 nautical miles (67 km) west of Kaohsiung, Taiwan. Her fourteen crew were rescued.
Seikongen	Chile	The fish farm ship capsized and sank off Chonchi. Her eleven crew were rescued. Raised for inspection/salvage 4 August 2018.

=== 23 October ===
List of shipwrecks: 23 October 2017
Ship	State	Description
Real	Togo	Typhoon Lan: The cargo ship was driven ashore in a typhoon at Fushiki, Honshu, Japan. Her nineteen crew survived.

=== 28 October ===
List of shipwrecks: 28 October 2017
Ship	State	Description
GF Tacuari	Paraguay	The tug struck a submerged object and sank in the River Plate at Colonia del Sacrimento. Her ten crew survived.

=== 29 October ===
List of shipwrecks: 29 October 2017
Ship	State	Description
Dharma Kencana II	Indonesia	The ferry caught fire in the Java Sea (05°04′S 109°54′E). All on board were rescued by Kirana I Kumai (Indonesia). Dharma Kencana II was extensively damaged.
Glory Amsterdam	Panama	The cargo ship ran aground in the Wadden Sea off Langeoog, Lower Saxony, Germany. She was refloated on 2 November and towed into Wilhelmshaven, Lower Saxony.

=== 30 October ===
List of shipwrecks: 30 October 2017
Ship	State	Description
Hongh Anh 69	China	The cargo ship capsized and sank in the Gulf of Tonkin. Her twelve crew were rescued.

=== 31 October ===
List of shipwrecks: 31 October 2017
Ship	State	Description
Lu Di 67	China	The cargo ship collided with Li Dian 2 (China) and sank in the Waigaoqiao Channel. Seven of her crew were rescued, one was reported missing.

== November ==
=== 1 November ===
List of shipwrecks: 1 November 2017
Ship	State	Description
Bilal Bal	Turkey	The coaster foundered in the Black Sea. All eleven people on board were reported missing. She was on a voyage from Bursa to Zonguldak.

=== 4 November ===
List of shipwrecks: 4 November 2017
Ship	State	Description
Bien Bac 16	Vietnam	Typhoon Damrey: The cargo ship sank with the loss of two of her ten crew. Six were rescued, two were reported missing.
An Phu 68	Vietnam	Typhoon Damrey: The cargo ship sank. Her eight crew were rescued.
Fei Yue 9	Vietnam	Typhoon Damrey: The cargo ship was driven ashore on the coast of Binh Dinh. Her fifteen crew were rescued.
Ha Trung 98	Vietnam	Typhoon Damrey: The bulk carrier sank off Binh Dinh. Her nine crew were rescued.
Hoa Mai 68	Vietnam	Typhoon Damrey: The cargo ship sank off Binh Dinh. Her eleven crew were rescued.
Jupiter	Panama	Typhoon Damrey: The passenger ship sank off Binh Dinh with the loss of one of her seven crew. Six were reported missing.
Nam Khanh 26	Vietnam	Typhoon Damrey: The cargo ship sank off Binh Dinh. Her eleven crew were rescued.
Son Long 08	Vietnam	Typhoon Damrey: The cargo ship sank off Binh Dinh with the loss of one of her twelve crew. Ten were rescued, one was reported missing.
Thanh Hai 18	Vietnam	Typhoon Damrey: The cargo ship was beached. Her crew survived.
Viet Thuan 168	Vietnam	Typhoon Damrey: The cargo ship sank.
VR-SB	Vietnam	Typhoon Damrey: The cargo ship sank off Binh Dinh.

=== 5 November ===
List of shipwrecks: 5 November 2017
Ship	State	Description
JJB Yu Hang 258	Dominica	The dredger foundered in the Malacca Strait off Parit Jawa, Malaysia. Her eighteen crew were rescued.
Pulau Pinang	Malaysia	The ro-ro ferry was driven ashore at George Town, Penang.

=== 11 November ===
List of shipwrecks: 11 November 2017
Ship	State	Description
Tariq Ibn Ziyad	Algeria	The ferry caught fire whilst on a voyage from Marseille, Bouches-du-Rhône, France to Algeria. She put into Mallorca, Spain, where all 500 passengers were evacuated.
Yu Tong 1	China	The cargo ship foundered off Huilai, Her fourteen crew were rescued. She was on a voyage from Maoming to Jieyang.

=== 15 November ===
List of shipwrecks: 15 November 2017
Ship	State	Description
ARA San Juan	Argentine Navy	Last communication from the TR-1700-class submarine in the San Jorge Gulf, after which she apparently suffered an explosion and sank with the loss of her entire crew of 44. The multipurpose offshore vessel Seabed Constructor (Norway) discovered her wreck on 16 November 2018 on the bottom of the South Atlantic Ocean at a depth of about 2,600 feet (790 m) approximately 280 nautical miles (520 km) off the coast of Argentina.

=== 18 November ===
List of shipwrecks: 18 November 2017
Ship	State	Description
Takamaru	Japan	The cargo ship ran aground off Tomakomai. Her four crew were rescued by a Japanese Coast Guard helicopter.

=== 21 November ===
List of shipwrecks: 21 November 2017
Ship	State	Description
Nefterudovoz 29M	Russia	The cargo ship was driven ashore at Bartın, Turkey. Her six crew were rescued by helicopter.
SCI Ratna	India	The offshore supply tug foundered in the Arabian Sea 90 nautical miles (170 km) west of Mumbai. Her sixteen crew were rescued.
Su Lian Hai 0118	China	The engineering vessel was in collision with MSC Luciana (Panama) off Port Caofeidian and was severely damaged. She was consequently towed into shallow water.

=== 27 November ===
List of shipwrecks: 27 November 2017
Ship	State	Description
Jin Zu Lun	China	The cargo ship collided with Shun Jin Long (China) and sank in the Pearl River. Two of her fourteen crew were rescued, twelve were reported missing.

=== 28 November ===
List of shipwrecks: 28 November 2017
Ship	State	Description
Zelinsky	United States	The ferry ran aground and was damaged at Lower Manhattan, New York City. Her passengers were evacuated.

=== 29 November ===
List of shipwrecks: 29 November 2017
Ship	State	Description
Serenity 1	Panama	The bulk carrier ran aground off Makira, Solomon Islands.

=== Unknown date ===
List of shipwrecks: Unknown date in November 2017
Ship	State	Description
ARA Comodoro Somellera	Argentine Navy	The Sotoyomo-class tugboat was sunk as a target on or before 10 November.

== December ==
=== 1 December ===
List of shipwrecks: 1 December 2017
Ship	State	Description
Shun Xin 188	China	The cargo ship foundered off Wuzhou Island. Her ten crew were rescued.

=== 2 December ===
List of shipwrecks: 2 December 2017
Ship	State	Description
KRI Sibarau	Indonesian Navy	The Attack-class patrol boat foundered in the Malacca Strait. Her nineteen crew were rescued.

=== 4 December ===
List of shipwrecks: 4 December 2017
Ship	State	Description
Qi Cheng Xian Feng	China	The coastal tanker ran aground and sank in the Yangtze Estuary. Her nine crew were rescued. Her nine crew were rescued by Dong Hai Jiu 102 (China).
Sheng Hai	Togo	The cargo ship sank in the Yellow Sea (37°07′N 123°53′E). Three crew were reported missing, seven were rescued by South Korean Coast Guard helicopters.

=== 7 December ===
List of shipwrecks: 7 December 2017
Ship	State	Description
Koza	Turkey	The cargo ship sank in the Atlantic Ocean 100 nautical miles (190 km) south of Freetown, Sierra Leone. Thirteen of her fifteen crew were rescued by ESL Europa (Poland), the other two by TD Tokyo (Liberia).

=== 8 December ===
List of shipwrecks: 8 December 2017
Ship	State	Description
Fuchun 688	Panama	The cargo ship was driven ashore at Changhua, Taiwan. Her eight crew survived.
Keneukai	Indonesia	The cargo ship was holed by her anchor and sank at Trisakti. Her fourteen crew were rescued.
Ricky Robinson	United States	The motor tugboat sank in the Mississippi River near Memphis, Tennessee, leaving two people missing and presumed dead.
Yicel	Panama	The coaster sprang a leak and was beached near Limon, Costa Rica.

=== 10 December ===
List of shipwrecks: 10 December 2017
Ship	State	Description
Pride of Kent	United Kingdom	In high winds, the ferry struck a bridge and ran aground on a sandbank at Calais, France. No injuries were reported.

=== 17 December ===
List of shipwrecks: 17 December 2017
Ship	State	Description
Makedonia	Greece	The ferry was driven ashore on Salamina.

=== 19 December ===
List of shipwrecks: 19 December 2017
Ship	State	Description
ARC Pascual de Andagoya	Colombian National Navy	The tug foundered in the Pacific Ocean off the coast of Colombia. Her six crew were rescued by the fishing vessel Conpe Malaga 3 (Colombia).

=== 20 December ===
List of shipwrecks: 20 December 2017
Ship	State	Description
KM Anugerah Abadi I	Indonesia	The cargo ship ran aground off Labuan Bajo. Fifty passengers were evacuated.

=== 21 December ===
List of shipwrecks: 21 December 2017
Ship	State	Description
Mercaft 3	Philippines	The ferry capsized and sank between Quezon and Polillo Island with the loss of four lives. Two hundred and forty passengers were resported to have been rescued.

=== 22 December ===
List of shipwrecks: 22 December 2017
Ship	State	Description
Little Şeyma	Panama	The coaster was driven ashore on Traganissi, Greece. Her twelve crew were rescued.

=== Unknown date ===
List of shipwrecks: Unknown date in December 2017
Ship	State	Description
Elektra	Indonesia	The chemical tanker was driven ashore at Pontang in mid-December. She had apparently been abandoned by her owners.

== Unknown date ==
List of shipwrecks: Unknown date in 2017
Ship	State	Description
"Colinne"	United Kingdom	The 69.75-foot (21.26 m) fishing vessel sank at her mooring at Wyre Dock, Fleetwood sometime in 2017.
Janzur	Libyan Navy	The Ikrimah-class patrol boat was sunk by an explosion sometime in 2017.
Kodiak Queen	Unknown	The decommissioned fishing vessel, a former United States Navy yard oiler, was scuttled as an artificial reef in the British Virgin Islands sometime in early 2017.
