= Peter Madsen =

Danish murderer and entrepreneur

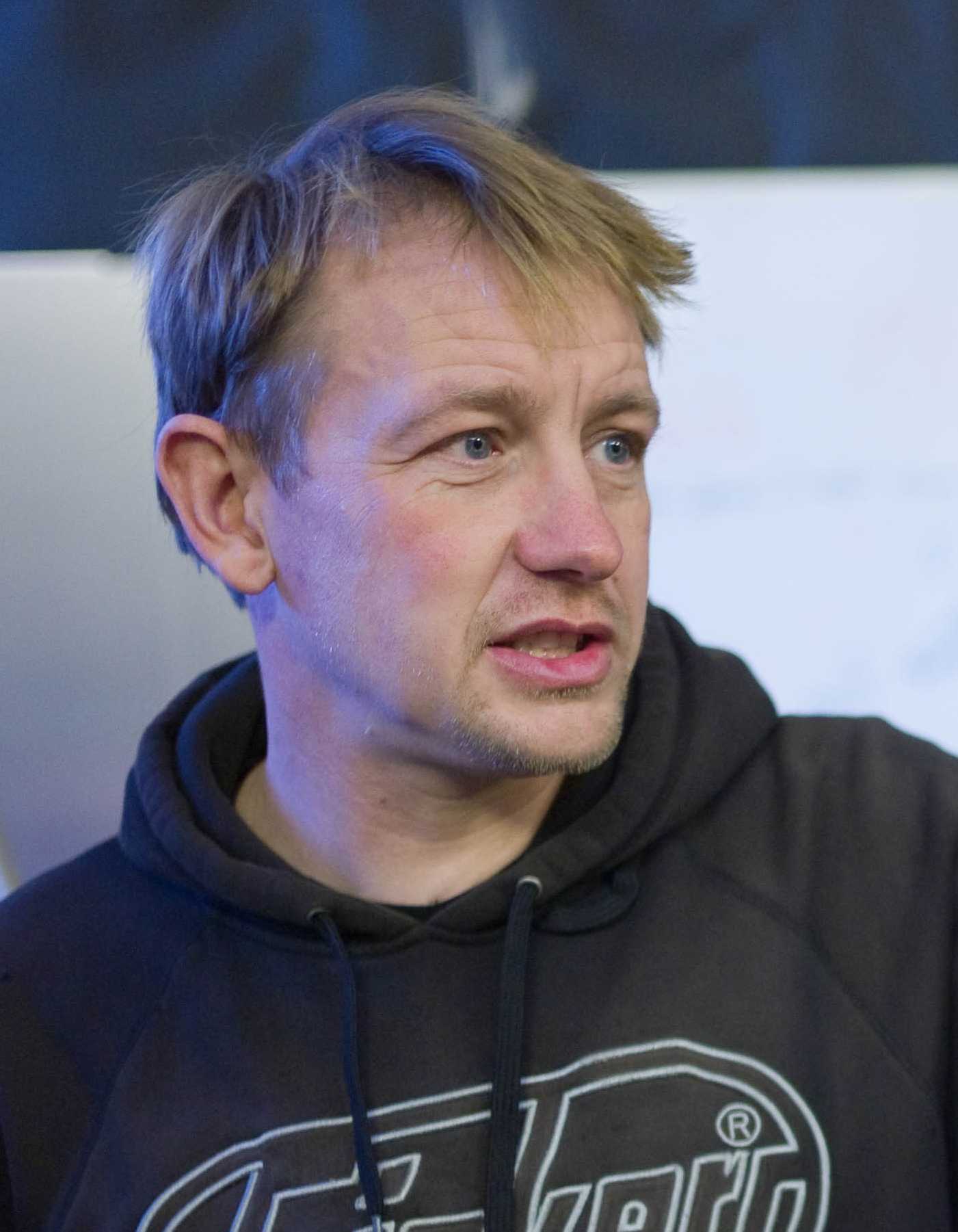
- Madsen in November 2010
- Born: 12 January 1971 (age 55); Denmark
- Status: Imprisoned at the Enner Mark Prison
- Occupation: Entrepreneur
- Spouse(s): Jenny Curpen, Russian opposition activist
- Convictions: Premeditated murder, sexual assault, and indecent handling of a corpse
- Criminal charges: Murder, indecent handling of a corpse, sexual assault
- Penalty: Life imprisonment

Peter Langkjær Madsen (Danish: [ˈpʰe̝ˀtɐ ˈlɑŋˌkʰeˀɐ̯ ˈmæsn̩]; born 12 January 1971) is a Danish convicted murderer and former entrepreneur. In April 2018, he was convicted of the August 2017 murder of Swedish journalist Kim Wall on board his submarine, UC3 Nautilus in Køge Bay, and sentenced to life imprisonment.

== Biography ==
Madsen was born on 12 January 1971 to Annie and Carl Madsen. He spent his early life in Sæby and Høng (both in Kalundborg Municipality), Denmark. Annie was more than 30 years younger than Carl and had three other sons from two previous men. Carl was allegedly abusive toward his three stepsons. Annie left when Peter was six, taking the children with her. After a couple of years, Madsen returned to his father, with whom he shared an interest in rockets.

While attending primary and secondary school in Høng, Madsen developed an interest in rocket fuel with the help of chemistry and physics teacher Johannes Fischer. He developed his first large rocket at Høng and launched it on 3 March 1986. It was one meter tall, modelled after the American ICBM MX Peacekeeper and built in his father's workshop. It reached a height of 100 m (330 ft) before crashing to the ground. In 1987, Madsen was accepted at the gymnasium (upper secondary school) in the nearby town of Kalundborg. He moved to live in a youth house in the town. His father died in 1990 when Peter was 19.

Madsen continued to experiment and to consult engineers, and became friendly with the family responsible for the fireworks in Copenhagen's Tivoli Gardens. He also joined the Dansk Amatør Raket Klub (DARK) rocket club in Copenhagen, but the other members gradually became disillusioned with him. DARK members claimed that "saying his name would start the fire sprinkler system". He never finished any formal education, but took courses in welding and engineering to learn something about submarines. His enthusiasm brought impressive results, but also caused conflicts with others. Madsen funded his lifestyle through financial support from people, organizations, and enterprises which saw promise in him.

=== Personal life ===
Madsen was married at Copenhagen City Hall in November 2011. His wife had worked in the film industry and had also helped in Madsen's workshop at Refshaleøen, Copenhagen. In February 2018, it was reported that his wife had left him after he was charged with murder. Madsen said that he had lived in an "open relationship". His wife has chosen to remain anonymous and her identity has not been released by the media. According to a report from Wired magazine, Madsen was a regular at fetish parties.

On 19 December 2019, Madsen married 39-year old Russian-Mauritian opposition activist Jenny Curpen. Curpen has had political asylum in Finland since 2013, because of her persecution in Russia. In a post on Facebook, Curpen said that she received death threats after her marriage was made public. According to a Facebook entry of Jenny Curpen, the couple divorced on 7 January 2022.

== Projects ==
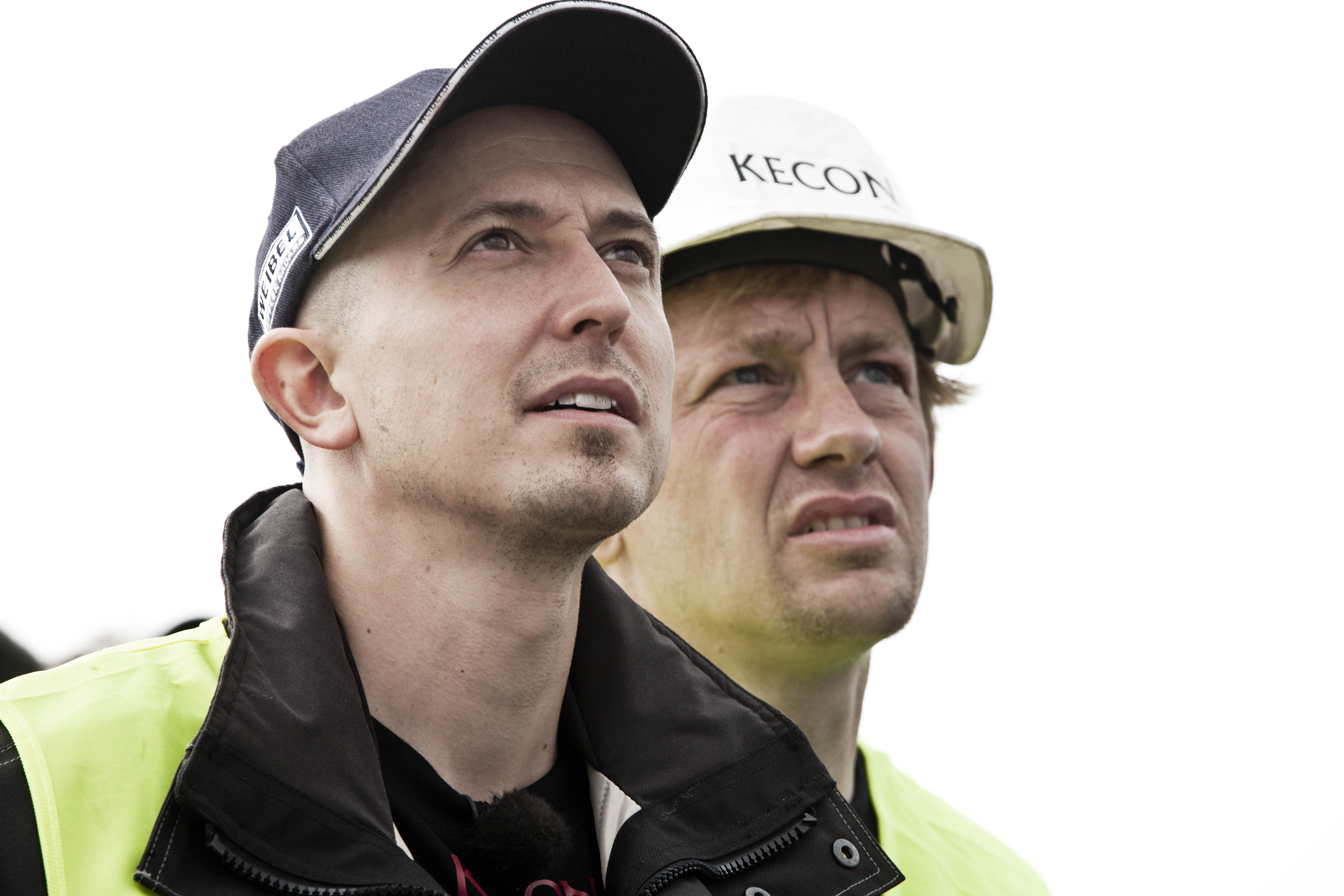
Madsen (right) with Kristian von Bengtson

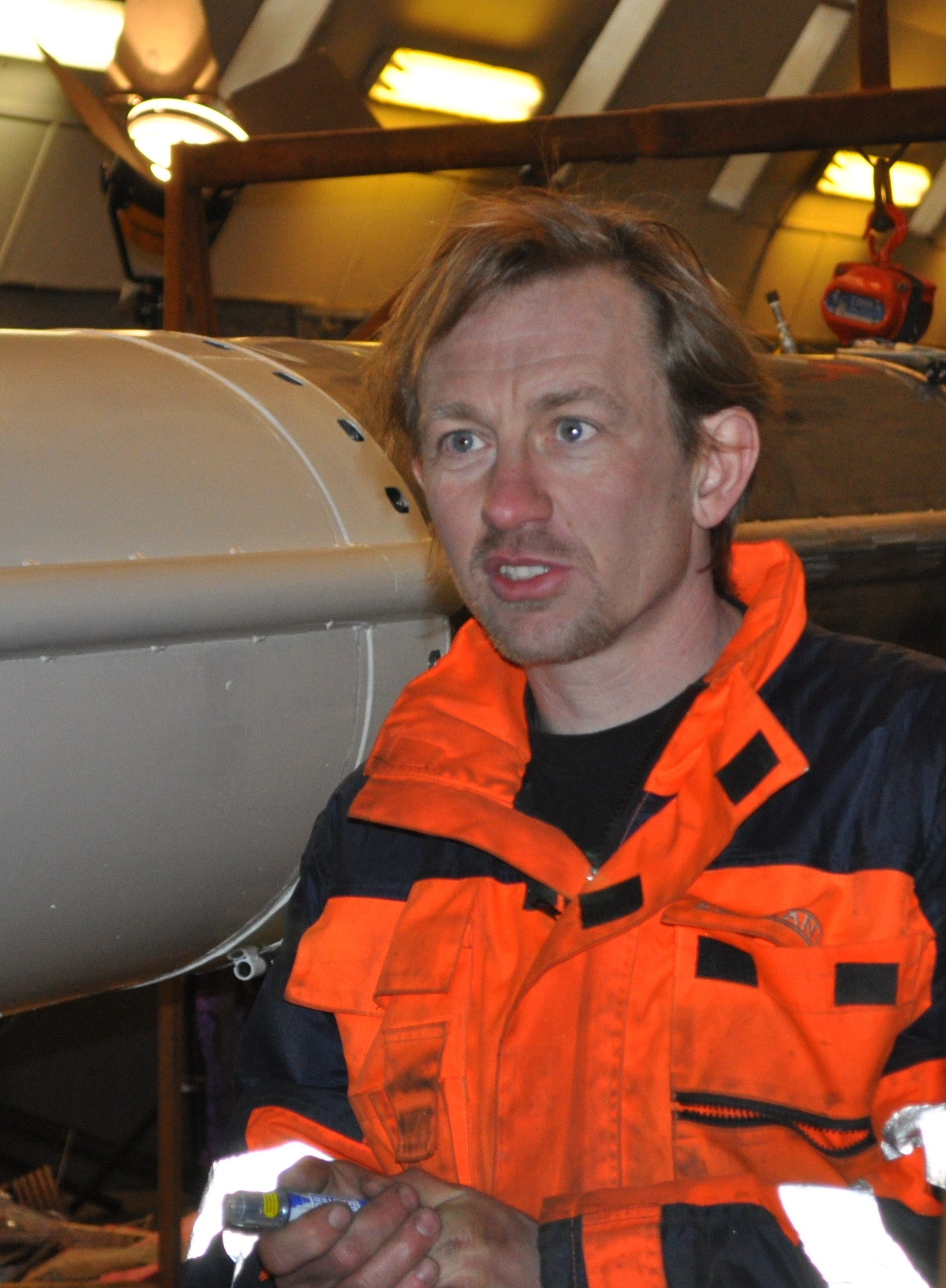
Madsen speaking at an engineers' conference, 2010

=== Submarines ===
Madsen built three submarines: UC1 Freya, UC2 Kraka and UC3 Nautilus. The Nautilus was a privately built midget submarine, launched on 3 May 2008 in Copenhagen, Denmark. Constructed over three years, it cost approximately US$200,000 to build (1.5 million DKK).

=== Copenhagen Suborbitals ===
On 1 May 2008, Madsen co-founded Copenhagen Suborbitals with Danish architect Kristian von Bengtson. In June 2014, he left the project. Madsen was responsible for the launch system, launchpad and booster rocket engines.

=== Rocket Madsen Space Lab ===
In June 2014, Madsen established RML Spacelab ApS. The goal was the development and construction of a crewed spacecraft. From 2016, RML was developing a nano satellite launch vehicle using venture investments. Under the title Raket-Madsens Rumlaboratorium (Danish for 'Rocket-Madsen's Space Laboratory'), Madsen blogged about his activities on the website of the Danish news magazine Ingeniøren.

== Murder of Kim Wall and sinking of UC3 Nautilus ==
=== Murder ===
On 11 August 2017, Madsen was arrested after the sinking of UC3 Nautilus and the disappearance of Kim Wall, a Swedish journalist who had last been seen alive aboard the submarine.

The following day, a court ruled that he be held in pre-trial detention for 24 days on a charge of negligent homicide. Madsen initially claimed that he had dropped Wall off on land at the tip of Refshaleøen on the night before the sinking. He later changed his statement, saying that she had died on board in an accident, and that he had buried her at sea. According to the Danish police, the submarine was deliberately sunk, contradicting Madsen's explanation regarding a technical fault.

A human torso washed up on the coast of Amager on 21 August, which DNA tests concluded belonged to Wall. Chief investigator Jens Møller reported that the torso had been stabbed multiple times to vent accumulating gases that could float it to the surface, and that a piece of metal had been fastened to it to ensure its sinking to the seabed. On 25 August, Madsen's charge was extended to improper handling of a corpse.

=== Trial and conviction ===
During a hearing on 5 September, Madsen stated that Wall had been killed when he lost his grip on the submarine's hatch cover, which he was holding open for her, and it hit her on the head, causing her skull to fracture. On 7 October 2017, Royal Danish Navy divers assisting the police found Wall's head, arms and legs, along with a knife and pieces of her clothing, in bags at the bottom of Køge Bay, weighted down by pieces of metal. A police spokesperson reported that there were no fractures to Wall's skull.

A post-mortem examination of the torso found "knife wounds to her genitals and ribcage", believed to have been caused "around or shortly after her death". The prosecution said that police had found videos on Madsen's computer showing women being murdered, and that witnesses said that they had seen Madsen watching videos of decapitation and practising asphyxiation sex. On 30 October 2017, it was reported that Madsen had changed his account of Wall's death and admitted dismembering her body.

It was reported that he now claimed that she had died from carbon monoxide poisoning on board the submarine, but his legal representation denied this, saying that Madsen did not know how she died. It was later confirmed by the police that he had made no clear statement on how she had died, but had said that she was inside the submarine when it contained exhaust gases.

In January 2018, Madsen was charged with murder, indecent handling of a corpse (due to dismemberment), and sexual assault (due to stabbings in genital region). The prosecution accused him of having bound, hit, cut and stabbed Wall before killing her by cutting her throat or strangling her. Madsen's trial began on 8 March 2018 with him pleading not guilty to Wall's murder. On 25 April 2018, Madsen was found guilty of all charges, and sentenced to life imprisonment. A psychiatric evaluation of Madsen described him as a narcissistic psychopath, lacking in empathy but not psychotic or delusional. Madsen immediately appealed against the sentence but not the guilty verdict. On 26 September 2018, the Østre Landsret (High Court of Eastern Denmark) upheld the sentence.

=== Later events and escape ===
Madsen was admitted to a hospital in August 2018 after being assaulted by an 18-year-old inmate in Storstrøm Prison. Madsen was also in a relationship with a female prison guard.

On 20 October 2020, Madsen escaped from prison. He was apprehended in a residential area near Herstedvester Prison. When police discovered that he was in possession of a pistol-like object and was wearing a belt that could potentially contain explosives, he was surrounded until bomb experts had determined that it was a decoy. On 9 February 2021, a Copenhagen court handed Madsen a 21-month prison sentence for his attempted escape from jail. The additional sentence was not added to the life sentence, but may play a role if a future probation request is made. In 2024, a short documentary was made about Peter Madsen's escape from jail.

== Media ==
On 24 January 2020, a Danish documentary, Into the Deep, premiered at the Sundance Festival in Utah, United States. The 90-minute documentary was directed by Australian-born Emma Sullivan and chronicles Peter Madsen and a group of volunteers helping Madsen with his projects – shot as it happens before and after the murder of Kim Wall.

The Investigation (Efterforskningen) is a Danish-language television dramatisation created by Tobias Lindholm, which follows the criminal investigation of the case. The six-part series premiered on 28 September 2020 on TV2 and SVT. It features Søren Malling as chief inspector Jens Møller, Pilou Asbæk as special prosecutor Jakob Buch-Jepsen and Rolf Lassgård and Pernilla August as Wall's parents. The TV series does not feature the crime itself and does not mention Madsen's name, whose character does not appear onscreen either; it focuses on the investigative work leading to his indictment and conviction. It has been compared to the 2020 BBC series The Salisbury Poisonings. The series was broadcast on UK's BBC Two between 22 January and 5 February 2021. HBO began showing it on 1 February 2021.
