= Danish UC submarines =

Danish UC submarines may refer to one of the following three privately designed, built, and operated submarines by the inventor Peter Madsen and associates at Ubadsklubben Freya.

- UC1 Freya, laid down 2001; launched 2002; decommissioned 2006; sunk 2008
- UC2 Kraka, launched 2005
- UC3 Nautilus, launched 2008; confiscated 2017
