= Kraka (disambiguation) =

Kraka may refer to:

== People ==
- Aslaug a.k.a. Kraka, a queen in Norse mythology who appears in Snorri's Edda, the Völsunga saga and in the saga of Ragnar Lodbrok as his third wife.
- Rolf Kraka, a legendary Danish king

== Ships ==
- UC2 Kraka, a private submarine
- Kraka, a reproduction Viking ship, see Viking ship replica

== Other uses ==
- Krákumál or the Lay of Kraka, a skaldic poem
- Acraea kraka, the kraka butterfly
