= RML =

RML may refer to:

- RML Group, a motorsports and high performance engineering company
- RML 380Z, an 8-bit computer built in Britain
- Ratmalana Airport (IATA: RML), near Colombo, Sri Lanka
- Ram Manohar Lohia, 20th-century Indian independence activist and socialist political leader
- Reuters Market Light, a phone service to provide Indian farmers with timely information
- Revised Marriage Law, a 1980 revision of the New Marriage Law in China
- Riemann Musiklexikon, a music encyclopedia
- Rifled muzzle loader, a type of gun common in the 19th century
- AEC Routemaster, a type of double-decker bus
- Rocket Madsen Space Lab (RML Spacelab), Copenhagen, Denmark
- Rocky Mountain Laboratories, a research institute in Montana, United States
- Roddenbery Memorial Library, in Cairo, Georgia, United States
- Royal Mail Lines, once a major shipping company, the successor to the Royal Mail Steam Packet Company
