= Into the Deep (2020 film) =

Danish documentary film

- Directed by: Emma Sullivan
- Produced by: Mette Heide; Roslyn Walker
- Cinematography: Cam Matheson; Henrik Bohn Ipsen; Lars Skree; Emma Sullivan
- Edited by: Joe Beshenkovsky; Anders Refn
- Music by: Dickon Hinchliffe
- Production company: Netflix
- Distributed by: Netflix
- Release date: January 2020 (Sundance)
- Running time: 90 minutes
- Country: Denmark
- Languages: English; Danish

Into the Deep is a Danish documentary film that premiered at the 2020 Sundance Film Festival on January 24, 2020. It was directed by Emma Sullivan and filmed in Copenhagen, Denmark. It was planned to be released on Netflix, but the release was postponed indefinitely when some participants stated that they had not given their consent to participate in the film. Before a subsequent release, Netflix, Plus Pictures and Sullivan agreed to re-edit the film to remove those participants who did not wish to appear. It was released globally on September 30, 2022.

== Synopsis ==
In 2016, Australian filmmaker Emma Sullivan began documenting amateur inventor Peter Madsen. One year in, Madsen murdered Swedish freelance journalist Kim Wall aboard his homemade submarine. The film is based on footage from Madsen's lab in the period leading up to the murder, as well as subsequent interviews with members of Madsen's team.

== Reception ==
The version that premiered at Sundance festival holds a 100% on Rotten Tomatoes. The film is described as moving with "breathless speed".
