= Murder of Kim Wall =

2017 murder in Denmark

- Kim Wall
- Native name: Ubådssagen ("Submarine case")
- Date: 10 August 2017
- Location: Køge Bay, Denmark
- Perpetrator: Peter Madsen
- Charges: Murder, indecent handling of a corpse, sexual assault
- Trial: 8 March – 25 April 2018
- Verdict: Guilty
- Sentence: Life imprisonment

The murder of Kim Wall (23 March 1987 – 10 August 2017), known in Denmark as Ubådssagen (transl. "The submarine case"), took place on 10 August 2017, after Swedish freelance journalist Kim Wall boarded the midget submarine UC3 Nautilus, in Køge Bay, Denmark, for a pre-arranged interview of its owner, Danish entrepreneur Peter Madsen.

Wall was reported missing after Nautilus failed to return to the harbour at Refshaleøen, Copenhagen. The submarine was found sunken the following morning and Madsen was arrested upon being rescued from the water. Between 21 August and 29 November, parts of Wall's dismembered body were found in different locations around the area. Convicted of her murder, Madsen was sentenced to life imprisonment on 25 April 2018 by Copenhagen City Court following a widely publicised trial.

On 20 October 2020, Madsen briefly escaped from prison by threatening a prison employee but was surrounded and apprehended by police 500 metres (1,600 ft) from the prison and taken into custody again. In 2020 a television dramatisation of the case was created by Tobias Lindholm.

== Events ==
=== Disappearance and discovery of remains ===
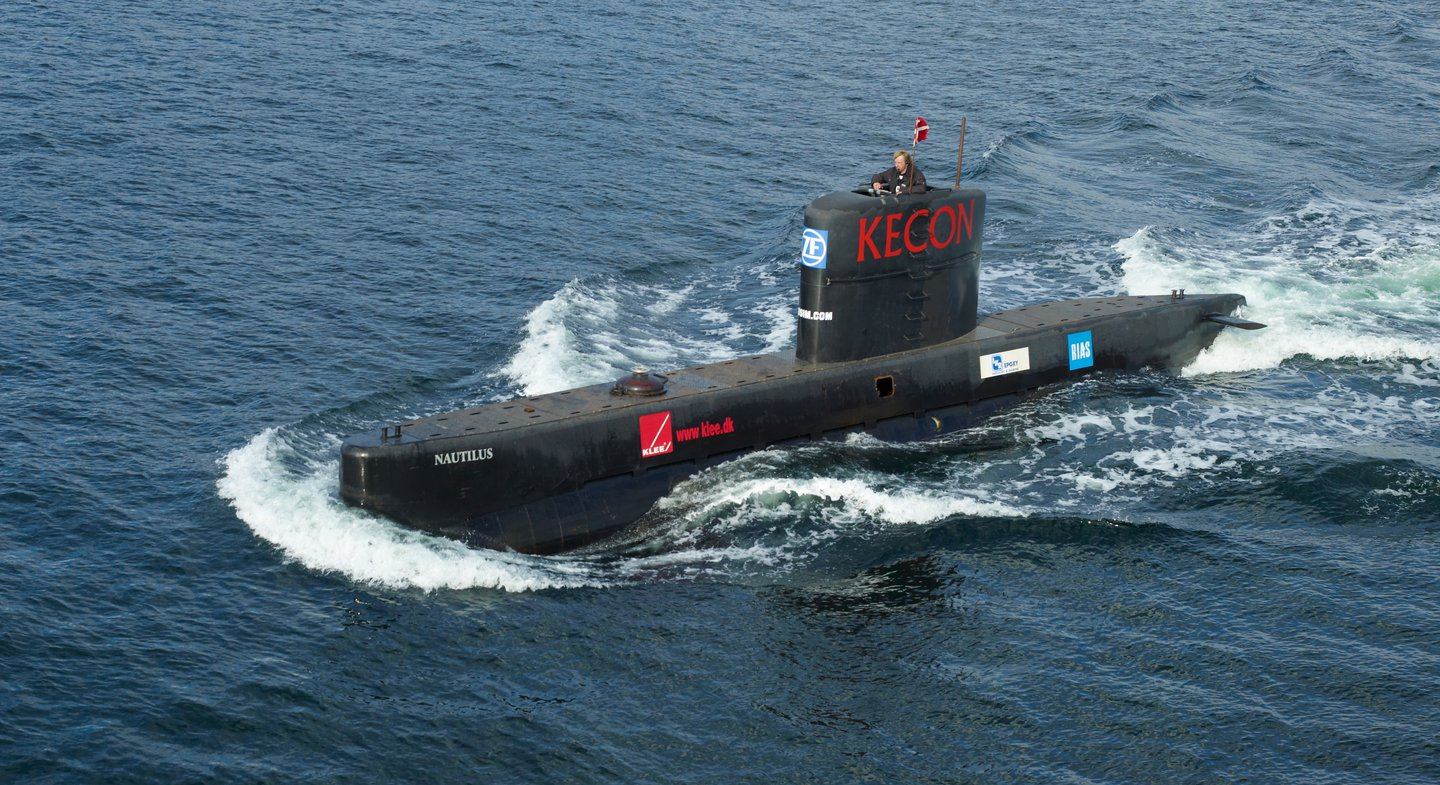
UC3 Nautilus

On Thursday 10 August 2017, Wall and her partner Ole Stobbe were preparing to host a farewell party in Refshaleøen prior to their planned move to Beijing on 16 August. Before the party, Wall received a text from Danish entrepreneur Peter Madsen—with whom she had requested an interview earlier in the year—inviting her to interview him on board his midget submarine UC3 Nautilus. She agreed to join him on the submarine for two hours and boarded Nautilus around 19:00 local time (UTC+2). The submarine never returned to the harbour and Stobbe called the police at 01:43 that night to report Wall missing. Nautilus was sighted in Køge Bay southeast of Amager by Drogden lighthouse at 10:30 the next morning; it foundered at 11:00.

On 21 August, a cyclist found Wall's torso washed up on a beach in the southwest of Amager. A post-mortem examination found fifteen stab wounds, mostly in the groin. Metal had been affixed to her torso in an attempt to ensure it did not float. On 6 October, assisted by cadaver dogs provided by the Swedish police, police divers found two plastic bags in Køge Bay containing Wall's head, legs, clothes and a knife; six days later, a saw was found in the water. On 21 and 29 November, police divers found Wall's arms in the bay. Police probed possible links to other murder cases in Scandinavia, including the unsolved death of 22-year-old Kazuko Toyonaga in 1986 in Copenhagen, but did not find connections to any of them.

=== Legal proceedings ===
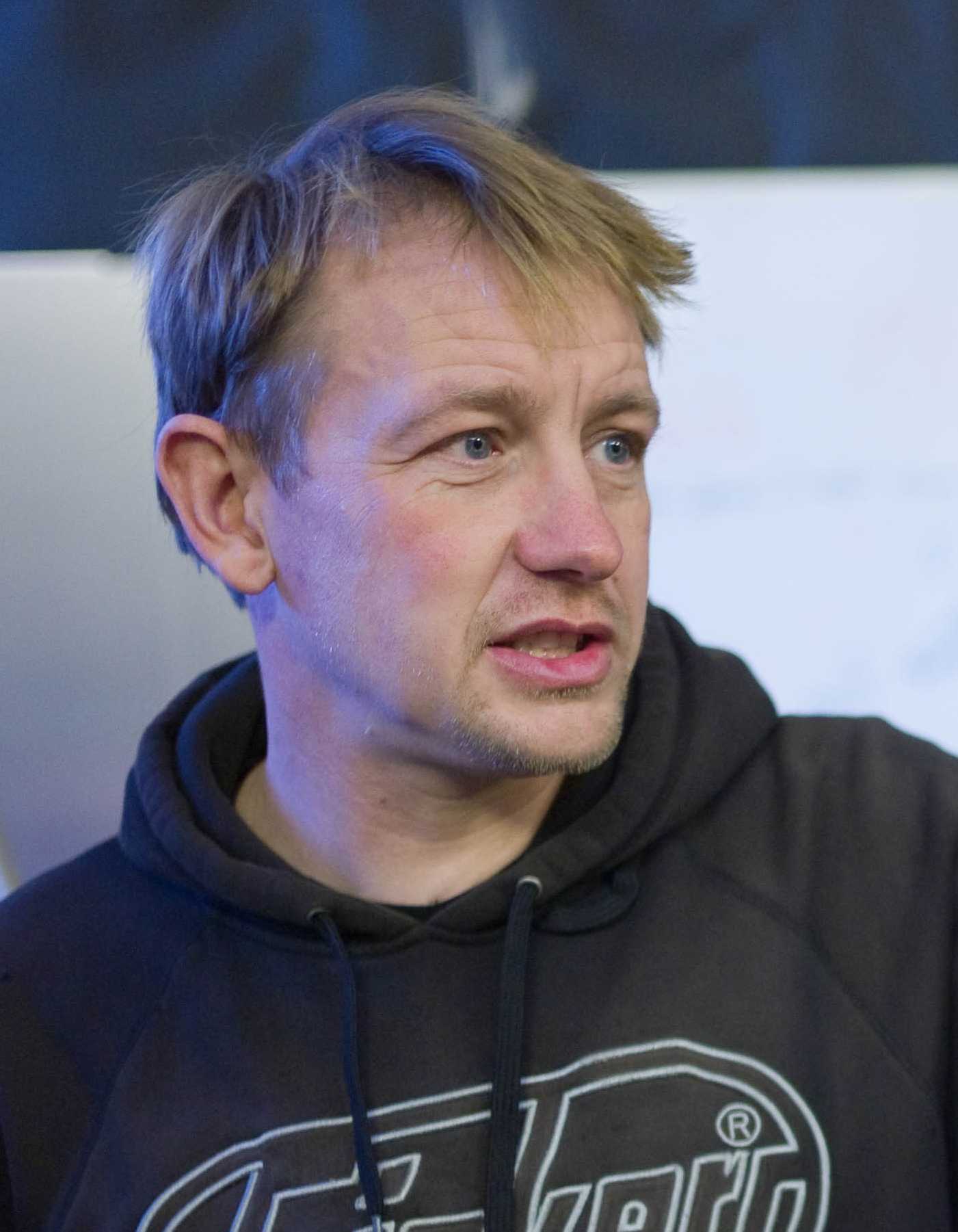
Peter Madsen

Madsen was arrested upon being rescued from Køge Bay after Nautilus foundered on 11 August and was charged with negligent manslaughter. Police suspected that he had scuttled the submarine. Madsen initially stated that he had dropped Wall off on land, but then admitted to dumping her body at sea after she died in what he claimed was an accident on board Nautilus. He testified in a court hearing on 5 September that Wall died after being struck on the head by the submarine's hatch cover. The prosecution said that police had found videos on Madsen's computer showing women being murdered, and that witnesses said that Madsen watched videos of decapitation and practiced asphyxiation sex. Prosecutor Jakob Buch-Jepsen said that, while forensic investigations had not found any traces of Madsen's DNA on Wall's body, traces of semen had been identified on underclothing secured from him after arrest. Madsen asserted that he had not ejaculated in Wall's presence. Traces of Wall’s blood were found on his nostrils and there were scratches on his arm.

A post-mortem examination performed on Wall's head after it was found a month later found no signs of blunt force trauma and did not determine the cause of death. Madsen subsequently changed his story, admitting to dismembering Wall's body but continuing to deny intentionally killing her, saying that she may have died after poisonous exhaust gases entered the submarine while he was on deck. The post-mortem performed on Wall's torso showed no signs of exhaust gases in her lungs.

On 16 January 2018, Madsen was charged with murder, indecent handling of a corpse, and sexual assault. The prosecution accused him of having tortured Wall before killing her by cutting her throat or strangling her. Madsen's trial began on 8 March at Copenhagen Court House. On 25 April, he was convicted of all three charges and sentenced to life imprisonment. Madsen appealed his sentence. On 26 September Østre Landsret, High Court of Eastern Denmark, upheld the sentence.

=== Aftermath ===
In August 2018, Madsen was admitted to hospital after being attacked in prison by an 18-year-old inmate. In a Danish documentary in September 2020, Madsen admitted that he had killed Kim Wall.

=== 2020 prison escape attempt ===
On October 20, 2020, Madsen briefly escaped from prison by threatening a prison employee, said to have been a psychologist, using a "pistol-like object", before fleeing equipped with an object he claimed was an explosive belt. The bomb squad was deployed, and Madsen was surrounded and apprehended by police 500 metres (547 yd) from the prison and taken back into custody.

== Legacy ==
A memorial run for Wall took place on 10 August 2018, the first anniversary of her murder, in which people around the world ran or walked a distance in her memory. In October 2017, Wall was posthumously nominated for Prix Europa's Outstanding Achievement Award "Journalist of the Year". On 9 November 2018, Wall's parents published a book in her memory titled Boken om Kim Wall: När orden tar slut (English: "The book of Kim Wall: When the words run out"). The book appeared in English in 2020 under the title A Silenced Voice, translated by Kathy Saranpa. Also in 2018, Wall's boyfriend Ole Stobbe related his experiences with the media coverage about the case in Danish newspaper Weekendavisen.

=== Kim Wall Memorial Fund ===
Wall's family and friends founded the Kim Wall Memorial Fund, to fund female and non-binary reporters to cover stories of cultural value.

Prize Winners

- 2018 – Anne Kirstine Hermann, Danish journalist
- 2019 – Christina Ayele Djossa-Ahoeletes, Portuguese journalist
- 2019 – Violeta Isabel dos Santos Moura, American journalist
- 2020 – Mia Alberti, Portuguese journalist
- 2020 – Clair MacDougall, Australian journalist
- 2025 – Raquel Carvalho, Portuguese journalist (together with Diana Kruzman).

== TV portrayals ==
Efterforskningen (English: The Investigation) is a Danish-language television dramatisation created by Tobias Lindholm, which follows the criminal investigation of the case. The six-part series premiered on 28 September 2020 on TV2 and SVT. It features Søren Malling as chief inspector Jens Møller, Pilou Asbæk as special prosecutor Jakob Buch-Jepsen, Rolf Lassgård and Pernilla August as Wall's parents, and Laura Christensen as investigator Maibritt Porse.

The Investigation does not feature Madsen or the crime itself, but focuses on the investigative work leading to his indictment and conviction. It has been compared to the 2020 BBC series The Salisbury Poisonings. The series was broadcast on UK's BBC Two between 22 January and 5 February 2021, remaining available on iPlayer for a year. HBO began showing it on 1 February 2021.

In March 2022, the TV mini-series Undercurrent: The Disappearance of Kim Wall was released. Directed by Erin Lee Carr, the documentary covers the crime and trial in two parts.

In September 2022, the Netflix film Into The Deep: The Submarine Murder Case was released. Directed by Emma Sullivan, the film uses footage of Madsen, his friends and interns, that had been filmed to document his quest to launch a rocket into space using his submarine as a command centre.

== See also ==
- List of journalists killed in Europe
