= UC1 Freya =

First privately owned Danish submarine

Freya
History

Denmark
- Name: UC1 Freya
- Builder: Peter Madsen, Copenhagen
- Laid down: 2001
- Launched: 4 May 2002
- In service: 2002
- Out of service: 2006
- Fate: Sunk as artificial reef, August 2008

General characteristics
- Displacement: 4 tonnes (3.9 long tons; 4.4 short tons)
- Length: 7.5 m (24 ft 7 in)
- Beam: 1.0 m (3 ft 3 in)
- Propulsion: 3.1 kW (4.2 bhp) (Electric)
- Speed: 3.5 kn (6.5 km/h; 4.0 mph) (Surface); 2.5 kn (4.6 km/h; 2.9 mph) (Submerged)
- Complement: 2

Freya or UC1 Freya (in Danish: Freja) was the first private Danish submarine, and thus first amateur electric sub in Denmark. It was built by Peter Madsen and Claus Nørregaard in 2001–2002, as a demonstrator to try submarine technology. Having made over 500 dives, it was decommissioned, as it was not designed for a long service life. It was decommissioned in 2006 after UC2 Kraka had been worked up. The submarine was then docked and allowed to decay. Final decontamination was done, and it was towed out to sea by UC3 Nautilus, in August 2008, and sunk as an artificial reef near Copenhagen. Freya is named after the Norse goddess of fertility and love.

== Construction ==
The sub was built at Peter Madsen's workshop in Farum, Denmark. Freya was completed in 2002. It was built with only an electric drive, a 3.1-kW Sauer-Danfoss 24V DC electric motor. Coupled with a 24V 200Ah Setronic-Flamm GS gel battery, this gave a range of 9.7 km (6 mi), but a charging time of 24 hours. This gave a cruise radius of 4.8 km (3 mi). The electric motor was sourced from a forklift. The sub had a service depth of 15 m (49 ft), and a theoretical crush depth of 135 m (443 ft). The sub was 7.5 m (24 ft 7 in) long, 1.0 m (3 ft 3 in) wide, and 2.9 m (9 ft 6 in) tall from keel to top of periscope. It could reach 3.5 knots (6.5 km/h; 4.0 mph) on the surface or 2.5 knots (4.6 km/h; 2.9 mph) submerged. Freya was not equipped with an air compressor, which limited the time length of dives. The sub could hold 2 people. As UC1 was a prototype, it was built out of regular steel, for enhanced strength, over aluminum or fibreglass, and making it cheaper than stainless steel. Operating costs originally were about 6 DKK worth of electricity for a couple of hours cruising.

== History ==
Freya was completed in 2002, and she was put to sea, starting voyages. In July 2002, out of the water for inspection and refit, it was crushed by a transport accident, when the truck it was on passed under a low bridge, and the attached crane was knocked over, crushing the conning tower and central portion. Insurance monies paid by the transport company were used to pay for repairs, making it seaworthy again, later in 2002. The repairs were done by Madsen and company.

After decommissioning, it was sunk to the bottom of the Øresund.
