= Kim Wall (journalist) =

Swedish journalist (1987–2017)

- Born: Kim Isabel Fredrika Wall; 23 March 1987; Trelleborg, Sweden
- Died: 10 August 2017 (aged 30); Køge Bay, Denmark
- Occupation: Journalist
- Years active: 2012–2017

Kim Isabel Fredrika Wall (23 March 1987 – 10 August 2017) was a Swedish journalist who worked as a freelancer for a range of English-language news outlets. She was murdered by the Danish entrepreneur Peter Madsen in 2017 onboard Madsen's privately built midget submarine UC3 Nautilus in Køge Bay, Denmark.

== Early life ==
Kim Wall was born on 23 March 1987 in the small town of Trelleborg in Skåne County and grew up there. Her parents were the photographer Joachim Wall and the journalist Ingrid Wall. Her family eventually moved to Malmö. Wall attended Malmö Borgarskola before studying at Lund University, the London School of Economics and Columbia University.

== Career ==
As a freelancer she wrote about diverse subjects including bio-hacking, vampyrism, fetishism, and radioactive garbage dumps on the Marshall Island to publications such as Time, Vice, The New York Times and The Guardian.

In 2013 Wall won the "Future of Journalism" prize awarded by the Foreign Press Association of New York. Together with Coleen Jose and Jan Hendrik Hinzel, Wall in 2016 won the digital Hansel Mieth prize for the German-language edition of her Marshall Island article, published by Süddeutsche Zeitung in 2015.

She received grants from several outlets, including the European Journalism Centre, the Pulitzer Center on Crisis Reporting, The GroundTruth Project and the African Great Lakes Reporting Initiative from the International Women's Media Foundation.

== Death ==
On 10 August 2017, Wall boarded the midget submarine UC3 Nautilus, in Køge Bay, Denmark, for a pre-arranged interview of its owner, Danish entrepreneur Peter Madsen.

Wall was reported missing by her partner Ole Stobbe after Nautilus failed to return to the harbour at Refshaleøen, Copenhagen. The submarine was found sunken the following morning and Madsen was arrested upon being rescued from the water. Between 21 August and 29 November, parts of Wall's dismembered body were found in different locations around the area. Convicted of her murder, Madsen was sentenced to life imprisonment on 25 April 2018 by Copenhagen City Court following a widely publicised trial.
