= B&W Hallerne =

Former industrial complex in Copenhagen, Denmark

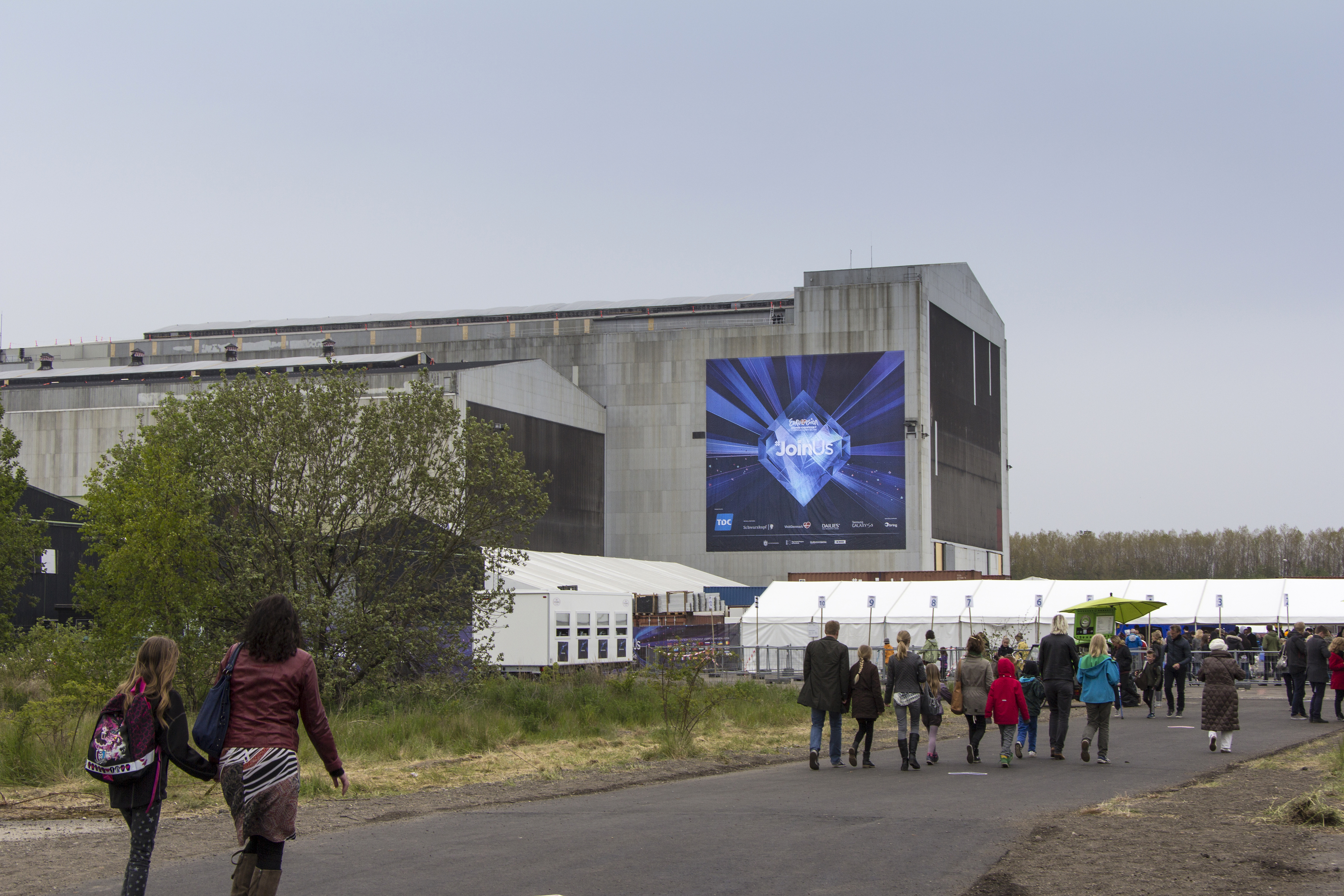
- B&W Hallerne on 6 May 2014
- Interactive map of B&W Hallerne
- Full name: Burmeister & Wain Halls
- Location: Refshaleøen, Copenhagen, Denmark
- Coordinates: 55°41′35″N 12°37′0″E
- Owner: Burmeister & Wain (until 1996); Refshaleøen's Property Company (1996–present)
- Capacity: 11,000

Construction
- Built: 1960s
- Renovated: 2011

B&W Hallerne (English: The B&W Halls) is a former industrial complex located on the island of Refshaleøen in Copenhagen, Denmark. Built in the early 1960s by Burmeister & Wain, the complex consists of two large halls which were used to build ships until 1996. Currently, the facilities are used for culture and entertainment activities.

On 2 September 2013, Danish public broadcaster DR announced that it had chosen B&W Hallerne as the host venue for the Eurovision Song Contest 2014. The contest was held at the Section Hall 2, which was converted into a music venue with a capacity for 11,000 spectators. The surrounding buildings and areas were transformed into "Eurovision Island" which was used for additional services related to the contest.

Preceded by Malmö Arena; Malmö	Eurovision Song Contest; Venue; 2014	Succeeded by Wiener Stadthalle; Vienna
