= The Investigation (TV series) =

2020 Danish miniseries

- Danish: Efterforskningen
- Genre: Drama
- Written by: Tobias Lindholm
- Directed by: Tobias Lindholm
- Starring: Søren Malling; Pilou Asbæk; Pernilla August; Rolf Lassgård; Laura Christensen
- Music by: Rune Tonsgaard Sørensen
- Country of origin: Denmark
- Original languages: Danish; Swedish
- No. of episodes: 6

Production
- Executive producers: Thomas Gammeltoft; Jennifer Green; Tobias Lindholm; Katrine Vogelsang
- Producers: Jonas Allen; Caroline Blanco; Peter Bose; Rene Ezra
- Cinematography: Magnus Nordenhof Jønck
- Editors: Peter Brandt; Adam Nielsen
- Running time: 41–45 minutes

Original release
- Network: TV 2
- Release: 28 September – 25 October 2020

The Investigation (Danish: Efterforskningen) is a six-part miniseries written and directed by Tobias Lindholm. The series is based on the investigation of the death of Kim Wall, a 30-year-old Swedish journalist. The series follows the criminal investigation of the case, featuring Søren Malling as Chief Inspector Jens Møller, Laura Christensen as Police Investigator Maibritt Porse, Pilou Asbæk as Special Prosecutor Jakob Buch-Jepsen and Rolf Lassgård and Pernilla August as Wall's parents. The series originally aired on 28 September 2020 on TV2 in Denmark and Sweden's SVT. It premiered on UK'S BBC Two on 22 January 2021. HBO began showing the series on 1 February 2021.

== Cast ==
- Søren Malling as chief investigator Jens Møller Jansen
- Pilou Asbæk as special prosecutor Jakob Buch-Jepsen
- Pernilla August as Ingrid Wall (victim’s mother)
- Rolf Lassgård as Joachim Wall (victim’s father)
- Laura Christensen as investigator Maibritt Porse
- Hans Henrik Clemensen as investigator Nikolaj Storm
- Dulfi Al-Jabouri as investigator Musa Amin
- Charlotte Munck as Kirstine (Jens Møller Jansen’s wife)
- Anders Juul as investigator Christian Skov
- Henrik Birch as investigator Lars Møller

== Episodes ==
No.	Title	Directed by	Written by	Original release date
1	"Dag 1"	Tobias Lindholm	Tobias Lindholm	28 September 2020
2	"Det vi ved, og det vi antager"	Tobias Lindholm	Tobias Lindholm	28 September 2020
3	"Jagten"	Tobias Lindholm	Tobias Lindholm	4 October 2020
4	"1280 meter"	Tobias Lindholm	Tobias Lindholm	11 October 2020
5	"Et helt menneske"	Tobias Lindholm	Tobias Lindholm	18 October 2020
6	"In dubio pro reo"	Tobias Lindholm	Tobias Lindholm	25 October 2020

== Reception ==
The review aggregator website Rotten Tomatoes reported 84% approval, with 25 reviews and an average rating of 7.7/10. Metacritic, which uses a weighted average, gave it a score of 65 out of 100 based on 10 critics, indicating "generally favourable reviews."

The series received five stars from Eva Eistrup, writing for Politiken. She acclaimed Tobias Lindholm's series as a "quiet masterpiece", and gave particular praise to Søren Malling for his performance as Jens Møller.

== See also ==
- Murder of Kim Wall
