= Malmö Borgarskola =

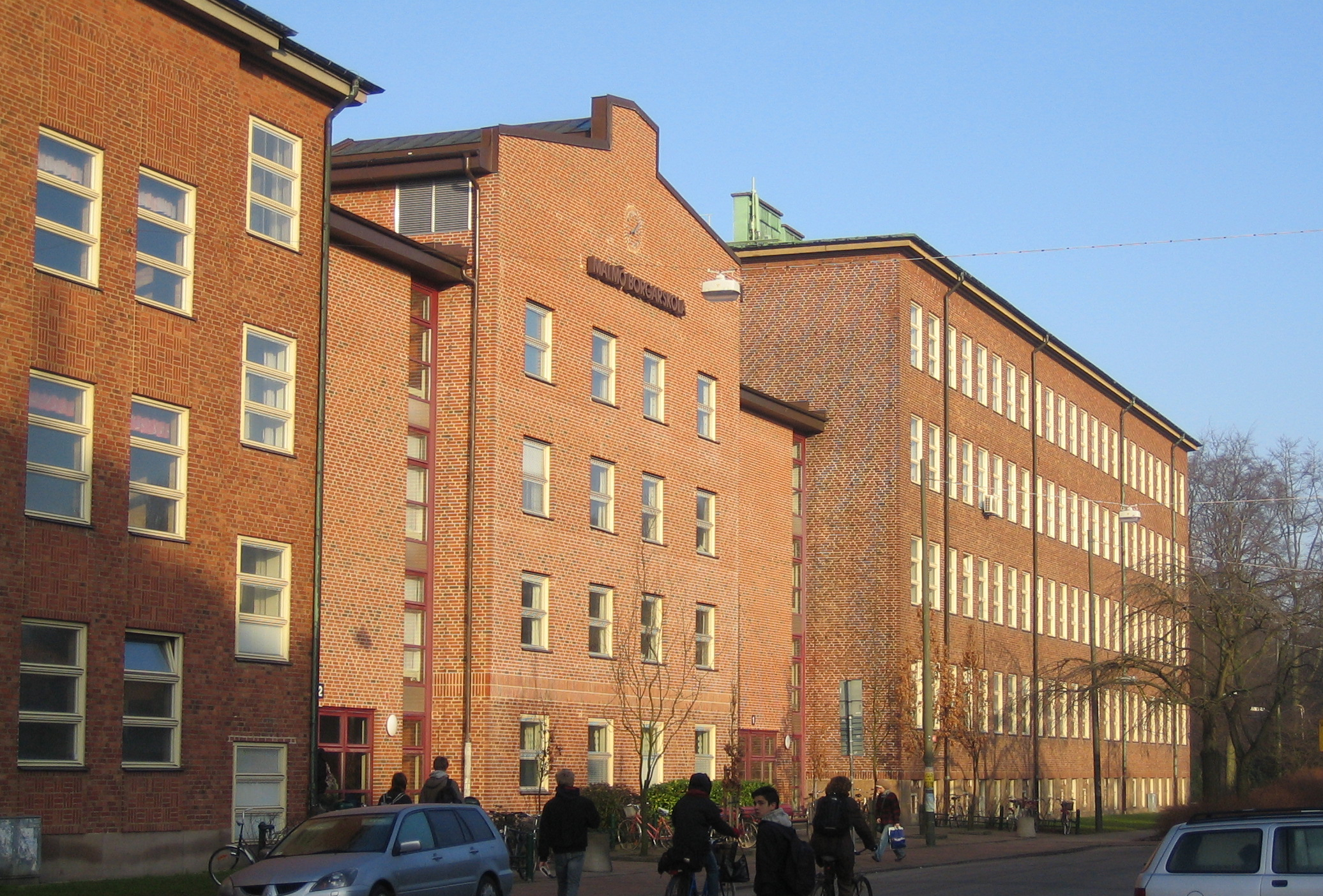

Location
- Malmö; Sweden; 55°35′55″N 12°59′28″E

Information
- Type: Gymnasium
- Motto: "Borgar för kunskap"
- Established: 1874
- School district: Malmö
- Principal: Linda Klang
- Enrollment: 1400
- Colors: Green and white
- Mascot: Bear
- Website: Malmö Borgarskola

Malmö Borgarskola is a Swedish gymnasium (upper secondary school) located in Malmö, Sweden.

The school was founded in 1874 and operates an International Baccalaureate programme.

The school hosts official education advising centres for students who are interested in studying in the USA (EducationUSA) and in the UK (EducationUK). Jack Straw visited the school when he was the Foreign Secretary for the United Kingdom.

The school offers several programmes, including:

- Natural Sciences Programme
- International Natural Sciences Programme
- Business and Management Programme
- Social Science Programme
- Hotel and Tourism
- Business and Administration
- International Baccalaureate Diploma Programme
- Introduction Programme
- International Baccalaureate Career-related Programme (in Hospitality Administration)

The Malmö Borgarskola Sports Association (MBIF), is one of the oldest sports associations in Sweden.

== Notable students ==
- Valerie Aflalo, Miss Sweden, 2000
- Daniel Andersson, footballer
- Renate Cerljen, Miss Sweden 2009
- Anita Ekberg, (1931–2015), Hollywood actress
- Adrian Granat, heavyweight boxer
- Per Albin Hansson (1885–1946), Prime Minister of Sweden, 1936-1946
- Zlatan Ibrahimović, footballer
- Agon Mehmeti, footballer
- Dardan Rexhepi, footballer
- Jasmin Sudić, footballer
- Evert Taube (1890–1976), author and artist
- Kim Wall (1987–2017), journalist
