= Rocket Madsen Space Lab =

Private rocket lab in Sweden

- Formation: 2014
- Dissolved: 2018

Rocket Madsen Space Lab (often called RML Spacelab) was a laboratory established by engineer and convicted murderer Peter Madsen on 16 July 2014 in Copenhagen, after he left Copenhagen Suborbitals.

Rocket Madsen Space Lab was located in the Horizontal Assembly Building (HAB) of the old B&W shipyard at Refshaleøen in Copenhagen. In this building Peter Madsen researched, developed and built rockets based on H_{2}O_{2} / polyurethane hybrid engines.

In preparation was Flight Alpha, which was expected to reach an altitude of 14 km.
