= Reuters Market Light =

Former agricultural information business in India

RML AgTech Pvt. Ltd. formerly known as Reuters Market Light
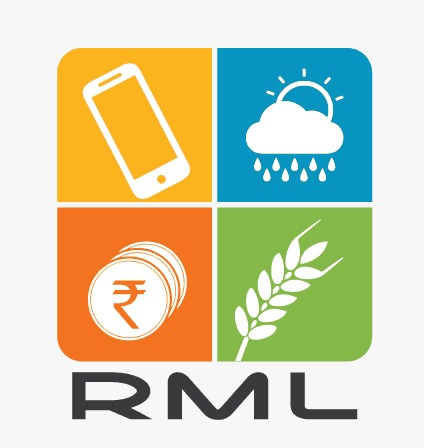
- Type: Independent Business
- Industry: Technology solutions for agriculture, digital technology
- Founded: 1 October 2007
- Headquarters: India
- Key people: Amit Mehra (founder and former CEO)
- Website: reutersmarketlight.com

RML AgTech Pvt. Ltd., formerly known as Reuters Market Light, was a business that provided technology and data analytics solutions to farmers and the agriculture value chain in India.

The Decision Support Technology provided farmers with personalised agricultural data analytics. They received data on topics like pre-sowing or post-harvest via a mobile application or SMS during the initial phase.

Approximately 3.4 million Indian farmers across 18 states were part of this service. They received information on 450 crop varieties and more than 1300 markets.

== Core Business ==
At its core, RML AgTech Pvt. Ltd. was an information service provider to farmers. They offered services to farmers including tailored information about crops and markets, information sharing through SMS, communication in the local language, farming tips based on local and international standards, user-friendly interface across all handsets and telecom operators, and rural outlets to facilitate easy accessibility for farmers with grievances.

== History ==
Thomson Reuters (then Reuters) began with a one-page idea of a Reuters employee to use mobile solutions to address the state of farmers around the developing world. Initial research suggested that farmers lacked relevant, reliable, timely and consistent information and commerce support to improve their productivity, reduce their crop losses and realize fair prices for their produce. The findings prompted the company to develop a system that addressed these problems with the help of technology. RML was designed keeping in mind the holistic approach to create a structured ecosystem for farmers.

Hence, RML approached the problem keeping in mind the individual requirement of each farmer. Therefore, the farmers received customized information based depending on their data. The type of crop, soil, location, irrigation type, and even the stage of the crop cycle was considered when a piece of information was sent out. Realizing the potential in the idea, Thomson Reuters incubated RML as an internal start-up as part of its global innovation program.

Spearheading this development was Mr Premprakash Saboo, co-founder, CFO, Head of Institutional Sales. Following nearly 18 months of market research, user-led prototyping, and market trials, RML AgTech was officially launched on October 1, 2007, in Maharashtra by Sharad Pawar, the union minister of agriculture of India followed by launch in Punjab in 2008 by Mr. Prakash Badal, the state's Chief Minister.

The business received funding from Thomson Reuters and IvyCap Ventures Advisors Private Limited (IvyCap), a fund management company. IvyCap, which is backed by the IIT Alumni Network, was the lead investor in RML AgTech. Thomson Reuters remained a shareholder and partner in the newly formed RML AgTech Pvt Ltd (formerly RML Information Services Private Limited).

The company evolved from a phone-led product to an Android app for the farmers. It launched data and commerce-support products for enterprises connected with the Agri value chain, such as banks and agri-input and sourcing companies. RML also worked with state and central governments and partnered with other telecom businesses, including as Nokia, Idea, Airtel, and Vodafone.
