= Søren Malling =

Danish actor (born 1964)

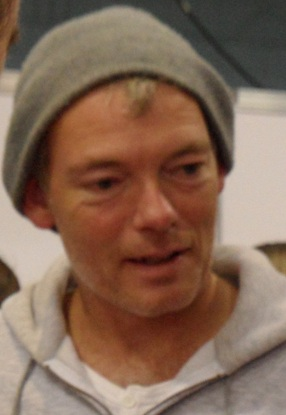
- Malling in 2011
- Born: 3 February 1964 (age 62); Kjellerup, Denmark
- Occupation: Actor
- Years active: 1992–present
- Spouse: Petrine Agger
- Children: 3

Søren Dyrberg Malling (Danish: [ˈsœːɐ̯n̩ ˈmæle̝ŋ]; born 3 February 1964) is a Danish actor. He played Chief Inspector Jens Møller in The Investigation (2020), a limited series by Tobias Lindholm based on the investigation into the murder of Kim Wall.

== Career ==
He was born on 3 February 1964. He was raised in Kjellerup, a small town in Central Jutland.

Malling graduated from Odense Teater in 1992.

In 2010 Malling played Torben Friis in another Danish series, Borgen, and later had a major role in 1864, resulting in him achieving international recognition.

In 2013, he received the Lauritzen Award. Malling won a Robert Award for Best Actor in a Leading Role for his role as Kjeld at the 2017 Robert Awards.

He had the leading role in The Investigation (2020), a limited series by Tobias Lindholm based on the investigation into the murder of Kim Wall. Malling's performance as Chief Inspector Jens Møller received praise from Eva Eistrup in Politiken, who described him as "in a league of his own."

== Personal life ==
He met his wife, Petrine Agger, in acting school. She played his character's wife Hanne in The Investigation. Agger also appears in Borgen. Malling has three children, two of them with Agger.

== Filmography ==
=== Film ===
- Når mor kommer hjem (1998) – Løber
- Mifunes sidste sang (1999) – Palle Alfon
- Polle Fiction (2002) – Karsten Kørelærer
- Charlie Butterfly (2002) – Brandmand
- Anklaget (2005) – Forsvarer
- Rene hjerter (2006) – Bent
- Anja og Viktor – Brændende kærlighed (2007) – Tommy Jensen
- The Early Years: Erik Nietzsche Part 1 (2007) – Hans Jørgen
- Blå mænd (2008) – Varberg
- Den du frygter (2008) – Søren Karlsen
- Vølvens forbandelse (2009) – Poppo
- Sorte Kugler (2009) – Læge
- Winnie & Karina – The Movie (2009) – Jacob Davantier
- Storm (2009) – Simon
- Julefrokosten (2009) – Torben
- Everything Will Be Fine (2010) – Karl
- All for One (2011)
- A Royal Affair (2012)
- A Hijacking (2012)
- The Hour of the Lynx (2013)
- A War (2015)
- Men & Chicken (2015)
- The Shamer's Daughter (2015)
- The Idealist (2015)
- Heartstone (2016)
- Parents (2016)
- Word of God (2017)
- Redbad (2018)
- The Vanishing (2018)
- Domino (2019) – Lars Hansen
- Gooseboy (2019) – Togmand
- De Frivillige (released as Out of Tune)
- Margrete: Queen of the North (2021) - Peder Jensen Lodehat
- The Promised Land (2023) – Paulli
- The Last Viking (2025) – Werner

=== Television ===
- Bryggeren, episode 12 (1997) – Arbejder
- Taxa, episode 31 (1998) – Mette tidligere chauffør
- Rejseholdet, episode 6 (2000) – Betjent Madsen
- Hotellet, episode 17 (2000) – Kristoffer Hansen
- Skjulte spor, episode 12–16, 18, 21–24 (2001) – Jacob Melander
- Nikolaj og Julie, episode 14 (2003)
- Forsvar, episode 4 (2003) – Steen Abelskov
- Er du skidt, skat?, episode 1 (2003) – Kurt Eierbäch
- Fjernsyn for voksne, episode 2 (2004)
- Ørnen, episode 9 (2005) – Nikolaj Groholskij
- Teatret ved Ringvejen (2006) – Carsten
- Forbrydelsen (2007) – Jan Meyer
- Deroute (2008) – Steffen fra Hvidevareproffen
- Blekingegade (2009) – Peter Kvist
- Borgen (2010–2022) – Torben Friis
- Wallander, "The Dogs of Riga" (2012) – Major Kàrlis Liepa
- 1864 (2014) – Johan
- Dicte (2016) – Tonni
- Below the Surface II (2017) – Hvalsø
- Face to Face (2019) – Richard Meyer
- The Investigation (2020) – Jens Møller Jensen

=== Animation ===
- Æblet & Ormen (2009) – Kirsebær
