= Køge Bay =

Bay near Køge, Denmark

Coordinates: 55°30′N 12°20′E

Køge Bugt marked in red

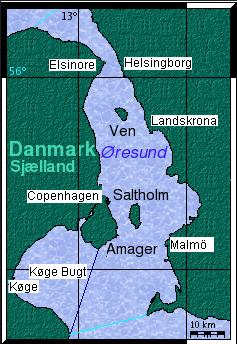
Location of Køge Bugt (Køge Bay) in Øresund

Køge Bay (Danish: Køge Bugt) is an approximately 500 square kilometres (190 sq mi) shallow Danish bay in the southern part of Øresund, between the Greater Copenhagen area in the North (or more precisely the southernmost peak of Amager) and Stevns Klint in the South, and as a part of Zealand.

It is named after the Danish town Køge, which is located towards its southern part. The area around the bay's shores are built-up from Copenhagen to Køge, including Copenhagen suburban areas like Brøndby Strand, Vallensbæk, Ishøj, Hundige, Jersie and others. The seafloor is not located deeper than 10 metres (33 ft) anywhere inside the bay. Due to its closeness to the Baltic Sea, the average surface salinity is lower than elsewhere in Øresund, especially when compared to the northern parts of this sound.

The landing approaches Copenhagen Airport runways 04L and 04R goes over the bay, it is used for approximately 30% of all landings.

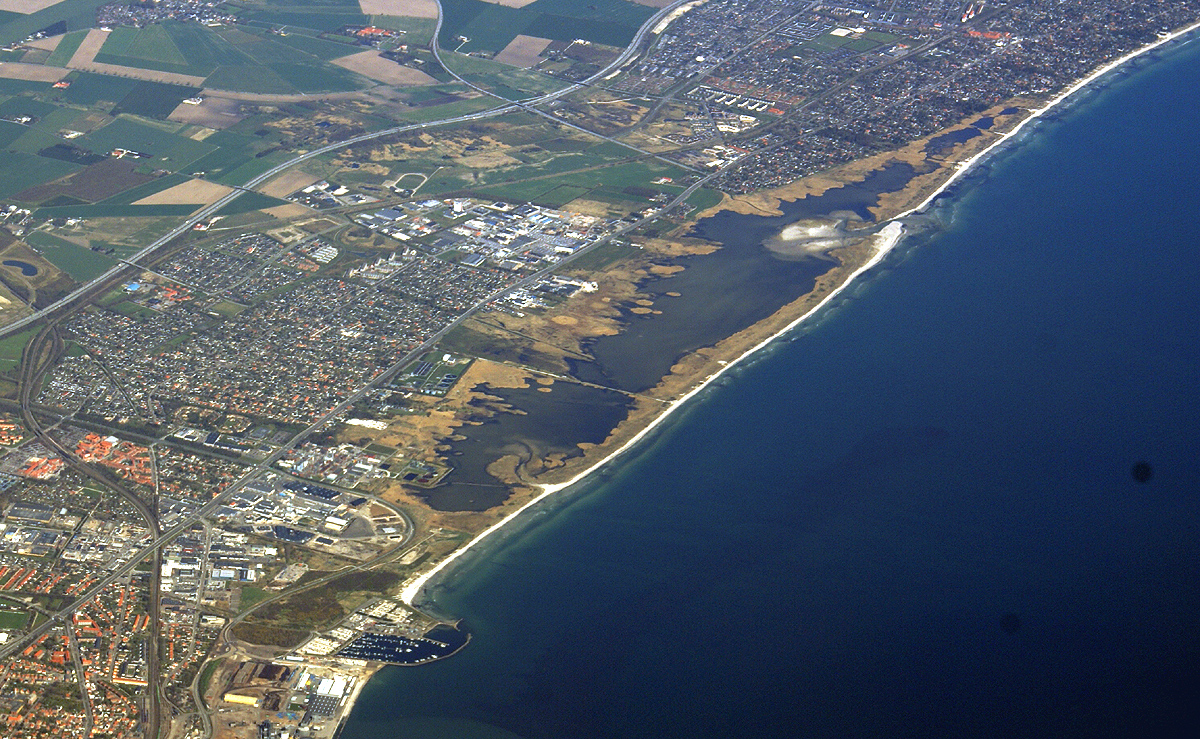
Aerial photograph of a part of Køge Bay's shorelines

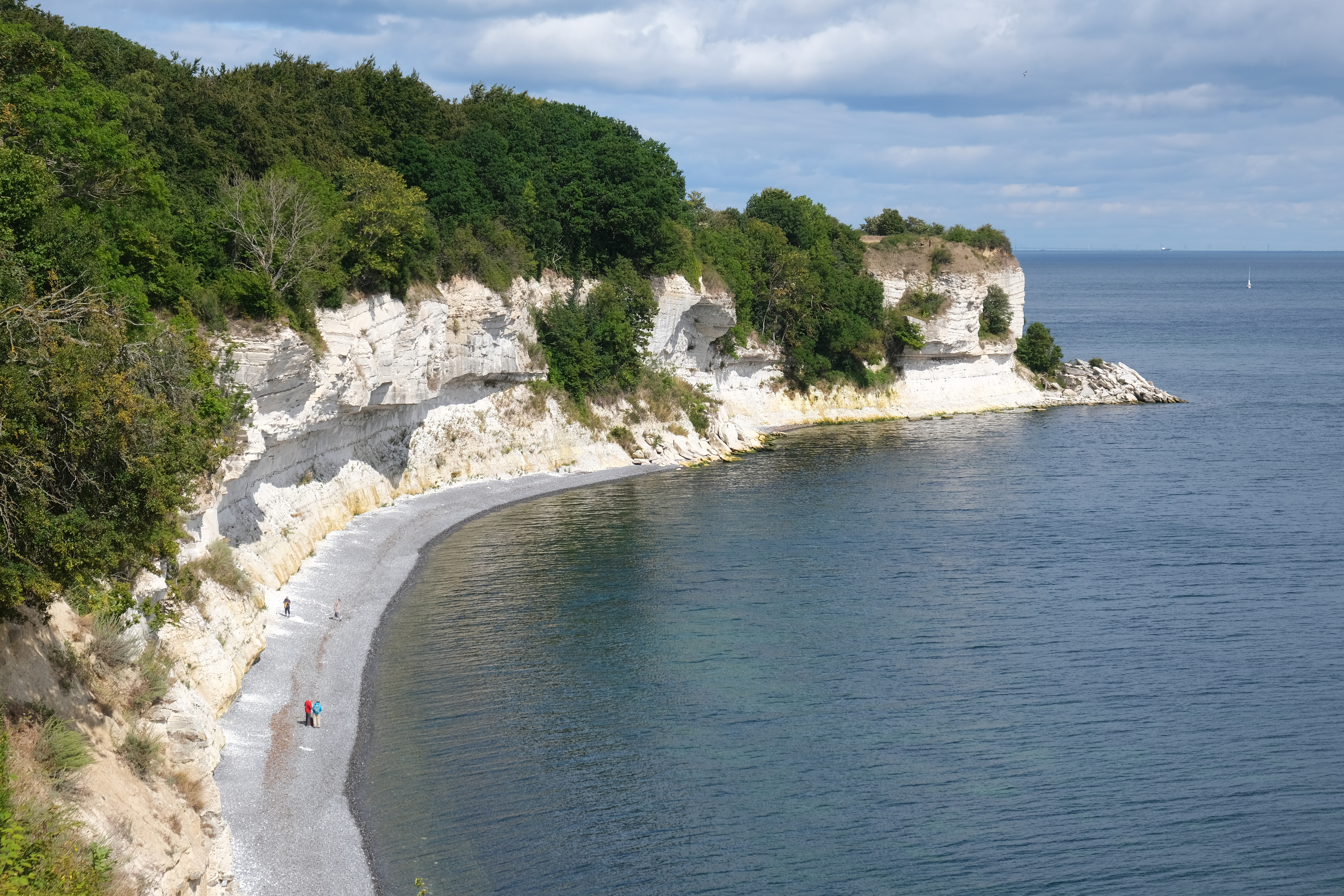
Køge Bay's southern marker, Stevns Klint, is also one of the southern marker points of the boundary between Øresund and the Baltic Sea

== History ==
In 1427, a Kalmar Union fleet was resoundingly victorious in a sea battle against the Hanseatic League. 1 July 1677, a sea battle between a Dano-Norwegian and a slightly larger Swedish fleet occurred in the bay. The outcome was a Dano-Norwegian victory, led by Admiral Niels Juel. An indecisive battle between a Dano-Norwegian fleet and Sweden was fought in 1710.

In August 2017, Swedish journalist Kim Wall was murdered in the bay by entrepeuner Peter Madsen on board his submarine UC3 Nautilus.
