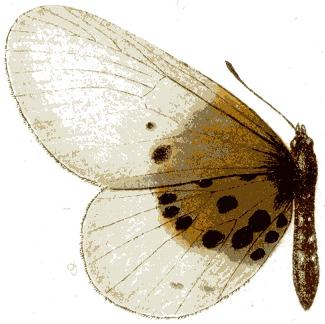

Scientific classification
- Kingdom: Animalia
- Phylum: Arthropoda
- Clade: Pancrustacea
- Class: Insecta
- Order: Lepidoptera
- Family: Nymphalidae
- Genus: Acraea
- Species: A. kraka

Binomial name
- Acraea kraka Aurivillius, 1893

Synonyms
- Acraea (Acraea) kraka; Acraea kibi Usher, 1986; Acraea kraka var. pallida Carpenter, 1932

= Acraea kraka =

Species of butterfly

Acraea kraka, the kraka glassy acraea, is a butterfly in the family Nymphalidae. It is found in Ghana, Nigeria, Cameroon, Equatorial Guinea, the Democratic Republic of the Congo and Uganda.

== Description ==
A. kraka Auriv. (53 b). Forewing to vein 2 and hindwing to the discal dots whitish yellow (male) or brown-yellow (female) (not black-grey as in the figure), otherwise hyaline; forewing usually with a black dot in the cell and with discal dots in 1 b and 2; hindwing in addition to the basal and discal dots usually with submarginal dots in 1 c and 2; marginal band diaphanous, 9 to 11 mm. in breadth. Cameroons, Fernando Po and Congo region in the primeval forests near Mawambi.

== Subspecies ==
- Acraea kraka kraka (eastern Nigeria, Cameroon, mainland Equatorial Guinea and Bioko)
- Acraea kraka kibi Usher, 1986 (Ghana)
- Acraea kraka pallida Carpenter, 1932 (western Uganda, Democratic Republic of the Congo: Uele, Ituri, Kivu)

Torben Larsen developed a species numbering system for his 2005 publication Butterflies of West Africa. The subspecies kibi is #1172. The 'Larsen' numbers have since been used with permission in A Sharp Eye on Butterflies of Ghana.

== Biology ==
The habitat consists of forests.

The larvae feed on Caloncoba species.

== Taxonomy ==
See Pierre & Bernaud, 2014
