= Murder in Danish law =

In Denmark manddrab (manslaughter) is the term used by the Danish penalty law to describe the act of intentionally killing another person. No distinction between manslaughter and murder exists. The penalty goes from a minimum of five years (six years in the case of regicide) to imprisonment for life. The standard punishment for manslaughter - i.e. where there are neither aggravating nor mitigating circumstances - is 12 years imprisonment. If the perpetrator is sentenced to life in prison (livstid / livsvarig fængsel), 12 years must pass before they can file for probation.

Besides the general offence described above there are more specific homicide offences in Danish law that are not considered as grave as manslaughter. Infanticide is defined as a mother who kills her child during or immediately after childbirth due to distress, fear of infamy or under the influence of a debilitation, bewilderment or perplexity caused by giving birth and is punished with imprisonment for up to four years. Euthanasia is defined as killing somebody on their definite request and is punished with imprisonment for up to three years. While attempting suicide is not considered criminal in Danish law, assisting somebody in committing suicide is punishable by imprisonment for up to three years.

Besides deliberate killing, Danish law contains two offences regarding unintentional killing of someone. Negligent homicide (uagtsomt manddrab) is defined as negligently causing the death of another person. The penalty is a fine or imprisonment for up to four months, under aggravating circumstances imprisonment for up to eight years. Aggravated circumstances could be killing a person while driving under the influence. Death caused by aggravated battery (vold med døden til følge) describes the situation where the perpetrator has the intention to commit an aggravated battery but where the battery leads to the unintentional death of the victim. The punishment is imprisonment for up to ten years.

If the court finds the person unfit for normal imprisonment, the person will have indefinite detention (forvaring på ubestemt tid) in a secured psychiatric institution. Every 5 years the person can file for probation.

== See also ==
- List of murder laws by country
