= UC2 Kraka =

Kraka
History

Denmark
- Name: UC2 Kraka
- Builder: Peter Madsen, Copenhagen
- Cost: 200,000 DKK
- Laid down: 2002
- Launched: 2005
- Commissioned: 7 May 2005
- Fate: On display, at Denmark's Technical Museum in Helsingor
- Status: Museum ship

General characteristics
- Displacement: 5,350 kg (11,790 lb)
- Length: 12.6 m (41 ft 4 in)
- Beam: 1.0 m (3 ft 3 in) hull; 1.7 m (5 ft 7 in) w/diveplanes
- Propulsion: Diesel–electric: 40 kW (54 bhp) (Diesel); 6.0 kW (8.0 bhp) (Electric)
- Speed: 9 kn (17 km/h; 10 mph) (Surface); 3 kn (5.6 km/h; 3.5 mph) (Submerged)
- Complement: 4

Kraka, or UC2 Kraka was an amateur-built midget submarine completed in 2005, the first diesel–electric amateur sub in Denmark. It was built by Peter Madsen, Claus Nørregaard and several other people. The overall length was 12.6 meters (41 ft), and it displaced 6 tonnes. The propulsion was diesel–electric with a 16 hp diesel engine and an 8 hp electric motor. Kraka can be seen at Denmark's Technical Museum in Elsinore (aka Helsingør). Kraka is named after a woman in Norse mythology known for her intelligence.

== Construction ==
The sub was built at Peter Madsen's workshop in Farum, Denmark. Construction took 2 1/2 years and over 3600 hours to build. It was built with two engines, a diesel and an electric, making the sub a diesel-electric. With a diesel drive, this theoretically allows the sub to have a 160 km (99 mi) range, and up to 130 km (80 mi) submerged. It can run at a speed of 9 knots (17 km/h; 10 mph) on the surface, and 3 kn (5.6 km/h; 3.5 mph) submerged, using the snorkel and with extra fuel aboard. The boat is 12.6 m (41 ft 4 in) long, 1.0 m (3 ft 3 in) wide, 1.7 m (5 ft 7 in) with dive planes, and 2.9 m (9 ft 6 in) high from keel to top of periscope. On electric drive, it has a range of 4.8 km (3 mi). On diesel drive, it has a range of 64 km (40 mi). It has a nominal dive depth of 15 m (49 ft), but the crush depth is theoretically 135 m (443 ft). Maximum operational depth is 35 m (115 ft). It has a 40kW Volvo Penta MD 19 diesel and a 6kW Sauer Danfoss 24V DC electric motor. The marine diesel engine was 65 years old when it launched in 2005. Backing the electric is 24V 400Ah Sectronic-Fram GS gel battery. UC2 has two sets of balance tanks, two main tanks and two trim tanks. With its flooding system, it takes only 20 seconds to reach neutral buoyancy. At the bottom of the sub is a dive lock, allowing emergency escape while submerged. The lock also allows use by divers while submerged. Unlike predecessor Freya, Kraka is equipped with an air compressor allowing for extended dive times. UC2 cost about 200,000 DKK to build. The sub can hold 4 people.

== History ==
Construction started in 2002 and finished in 2005, when it was launched and put out to sea for voyages. At the time it was finished, it was one of only three diesel submarines in private civilian hands in the world, and one of only seven civil private sea-going submarines in the world.

After decommissioning, it was put on display, at Denmark's Technical Museum in Helsingor.
