= UC3 Nautilus =

Privately built Danish midget submarine

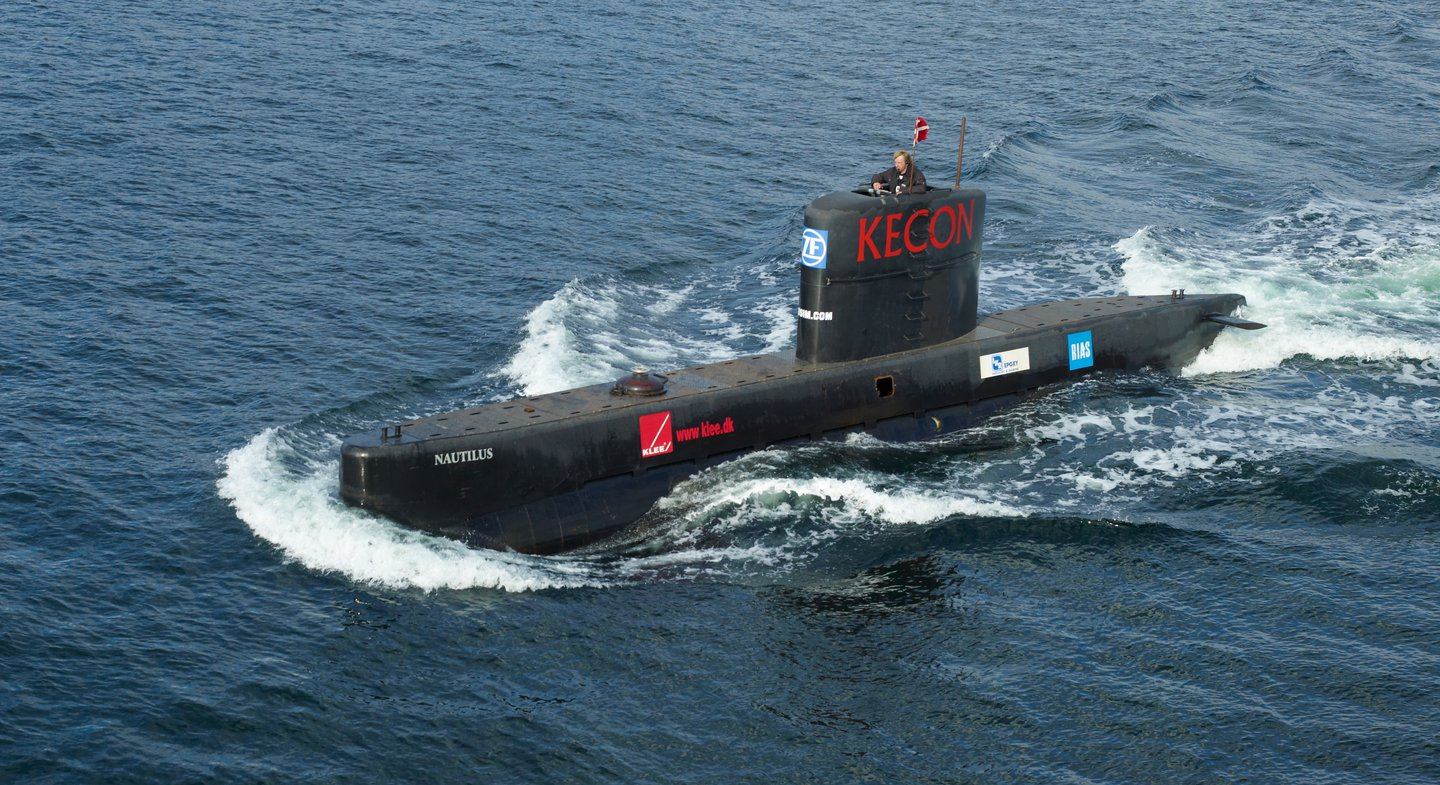
- UC3 Nautilus in early sea trials

History
- Name: UC3 Nautilus
- Launched: 3 May 2008
- Fate: Destroyed (finalized December 2018)

General characteristics
- Type: Midget submarine
- Tonnage: 40 GT
- Length: 17.76 m (58 ft 3 in)
- Beam: 2 m (6 ft 7 in)
- Propulsion: 1 diesel engine; 1 electric motor
- Speed: 6 knots (11 km/h; 6.9 mph)
- Crew: 4–8

UC3 Nautilus was a privately built Danish midget submarine. It was built over a three-year period by Peter Madsen and a group of volunteers, and cost approximately US$200,000 to build (1.5 million DKK). The submarine was Madsen's third submarine design.

On 11 August 2017, Nautilus sank in the bay of Køge, in what investigators determined was a deliberate act by Madsen. The following day, Danish police had the submarine salvaged and brought onto land as part of the investigation of the death of Swedish journalist Kim Wall, who was last seen alive on board. As part of the conviction of Madsen for Wall's murder, the submarine was confiscated and later destroyed by the authorities.

== Launch ==
On the day of its launch on 3 May 2008, UC3 Nautilus displaced only 32 tons and was still incomplete. It was named at a well-attended ceremony on the west side of Refshaleøen and towed to the floating installation art barge Illutron (formerly M/S Half Machine) in the Kongens Enghave, where further outfitting and installation of equipment took place over the next several months. By August 2008, Nautilus could sail on its own, as the main diesel engine drive train and steering was completed. On its maiden voyage, the submarine was driven by former crewmen of the now-defunct Royal Danish Navy submarine division. The objective was to sail Nautilus and evaluate her maneuverability, and the appraisal was favourable. In October 2008, Nautilus was submerged for the first time.

== Specifications ==
Nautilus could be crewed by up to eight people for surface operation and four when diving. The submarine moved at five to six knots, depending on conditions and whether it was submerged. It had two 1,500 litres (400 US gal) tanks for fresh water and fuel. Trim was carried out normally with an electric pump, or with compressed air as fall-back if the trim-pump fails. The main ballast tanks of 8,000 litres (2,100 US gal) were filled and emptied with compressed air and could flush up to 400 litres (110 US gal) of water in/out per second. It could descend to periscope depth in approximately 20 seconds. The boat had a design crush depth of 400–500 m (1,300–1,600 ft), and had dived to about 100 m (330 ft).

There were 16 portholes (8 on each side, 2 oversized) for direct observation. The periscope had five video cameras, providing 360-degree panoramic vision on video screens in the forward control room. The engine room had two diesel engines, one of which was for direct propulsion. The other drove a three-phase electric generator providing power for the onboard air compressor and battery charger. There were more than a tonne of large 12-volt batteries on board, supplying the DC electric motor which could be operated alone or in tandem with the main engine on a chain-coupled drive for turning the 80 kilogram, five-bladed brass propeller. Joystick-controlled electric servos operated the rudder (aft) and hydroplanes (front).

Nautilus was much smaller than the Danish Kobben-class submarine at about two fifths the length, two fifths the width, and running at just above one third the speed. In early 2009, an automatic snorkel system was installed so that the submarine could sail submerged on diesel power, and in August it sailed out from Køge submerged.

The submarine could be operated by a single person from the control room. All controls and indicators were accessible from the captain's seat for controlling buoyancy, pumps, engines, air pressure, communication, video, and other electric systems. As of July 2010, the engine crew still needed to perform manual changeover from surface to dive-ready configuration, involving setting valves correctly for the snorkel and diesel engine exhaust. Nautilus could function on her diesel engine for up to eight minutes underwater without her snorkel. The engine required a steady supply of air to operate, unlike the electric motor, and using it while submerged dropped the air pressure to the equivalent of 3,000 m (9,800 ft) above sea level, as the engine ingested air from the crew compartment unless the snorkel was used.

== Missions ==
On a 2009 trip around Refshaleøen, Nautilus was visited by a group of submarine fans from Subsim. Video game developers from Ubisoft were also on board to find inspiration for their submarine game, Silent Hunter 5.

Nautilus was used by her builders and various others for recreation and expeditions. One such expedition was the attempted launch of the rocket and spacecraft HEAT 1X Tycho Brahe, built by Madsen's non-profit organization Copenhagen Suborbitals. On Tuesday 31 August 2010, the submarine pushed the launch platform Sputnik, carrying the craft from Copenhagen towards the launch site near Nexø, Bornholm.

In January 2011, Nautilus returned to Refshaleøen to be taken on shore for upgrades, then expected to last several months. On 28 April 2017, Nautilus was launched again following repairs and upgrades.

== Sinking in 2017 ==
On 10 August 2017, Nautilus was scheduled to sail from Copenhagen to appear in the afternoon at an exhibit on Bornholm, but Madsen sent a text notifying the crew that the trip had been cancelled. Nautilus left Refshaleøen around 19:00 with Madsen and Swedish journalist Kim Wall aboard.

Nautilus was reported missing early the following morning. Danish police visited a crew member to establish who was on board, and a large search operation was launched using helicopters and ships in the port of Øresund, just outside the harbour of Copenhagen. At 11:00, it sank and Madsen was rescued by a private boat. Danish police charged him with murder, suspecting him of scuttling Nautilus to destroy evidence.

The following day, Danish police had the submarine salvaged, brought onto land and began processing it for evidence. In April 2018, Madsen was convicted of Wall's murder.

== Destruction ==
As part of the conviction, the ownership of the submarine and all its content was transferred to the Danish State. It was destroyed by authorities.
