= Refshaleøen, Copenhagen =

Island in Copenhagen, Denmark

Coordinates: 55.692°N 12.617°E

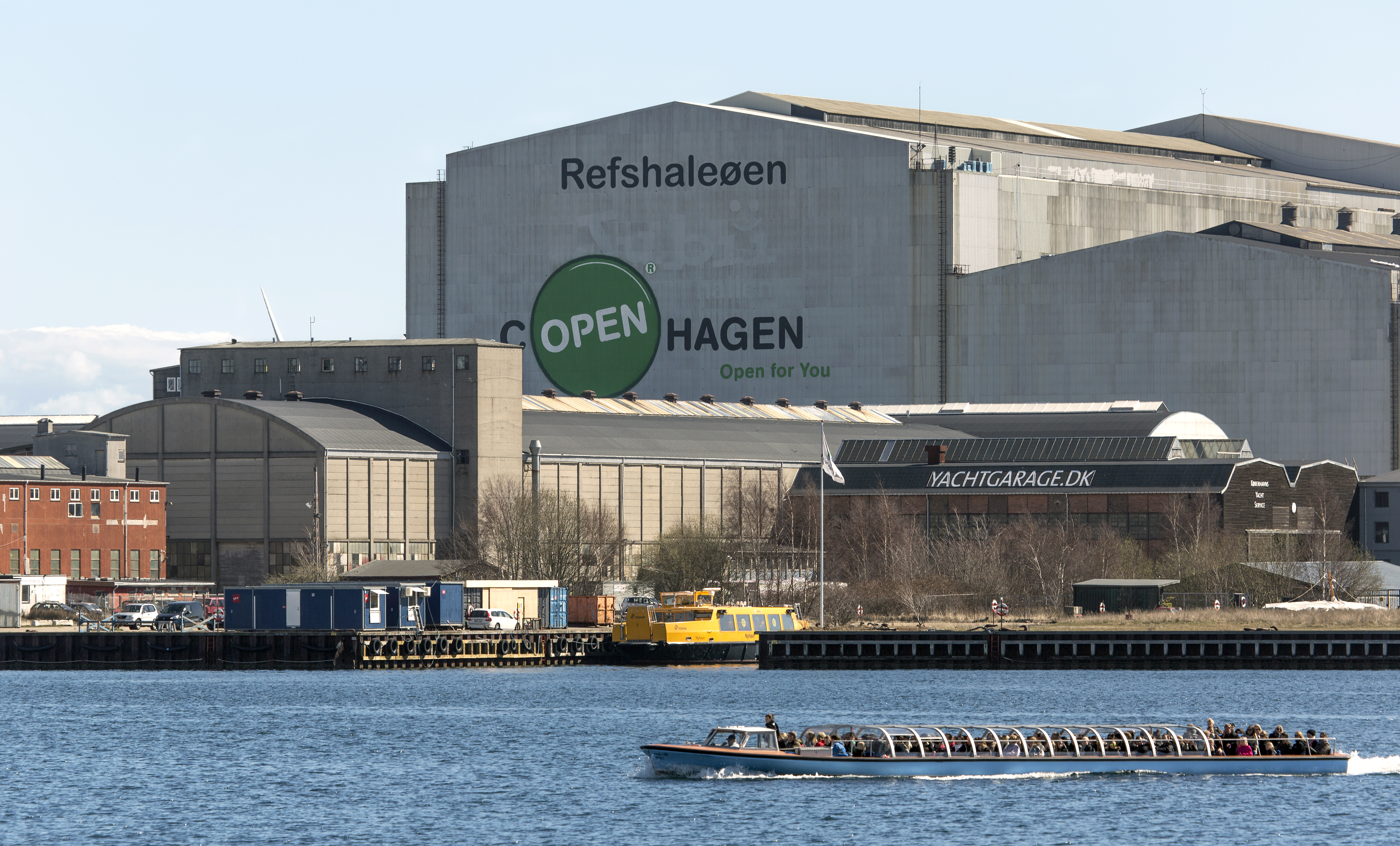
Refshaleøen with B&W Hallerne in the background

Refshaleøen is a former industrial site in the harbor of Copenhagen, Denmark, originally on a separate island but now annexed to the larger island of Amager. For more than a hundred years, it was home to the shipyard Burmeister & Wain, which closed in 1996.

== History ==
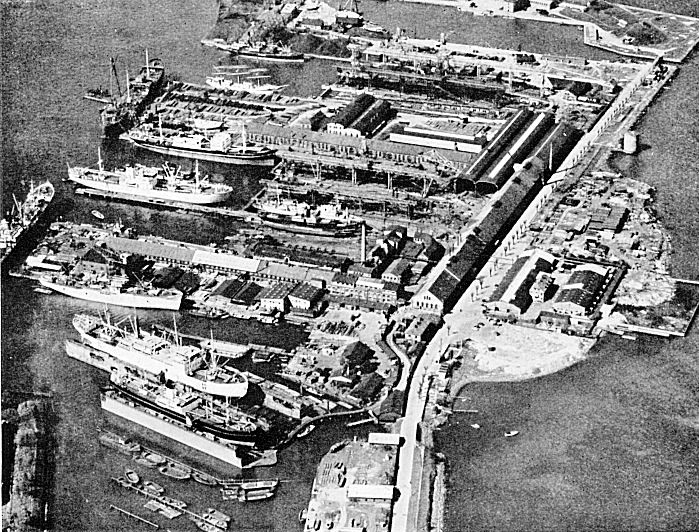
An aerial shot of Refshaleøen around 1900

In 1624, a block house was built on the original island, then much smaller, to guard the entrance to Copenhagen harbor together with St. Ann's Fortress (now Kastellet) on the coast just north of city. Reclamation increased the size of the island considerably in the 1870s when the port's waterways were made deeper. Burmeister & Wain established a shipyard on the island in 1871. At its height, the shipyard employed 8,000 people, and so appears as an icon of Danish industrial history.

== Current use ==
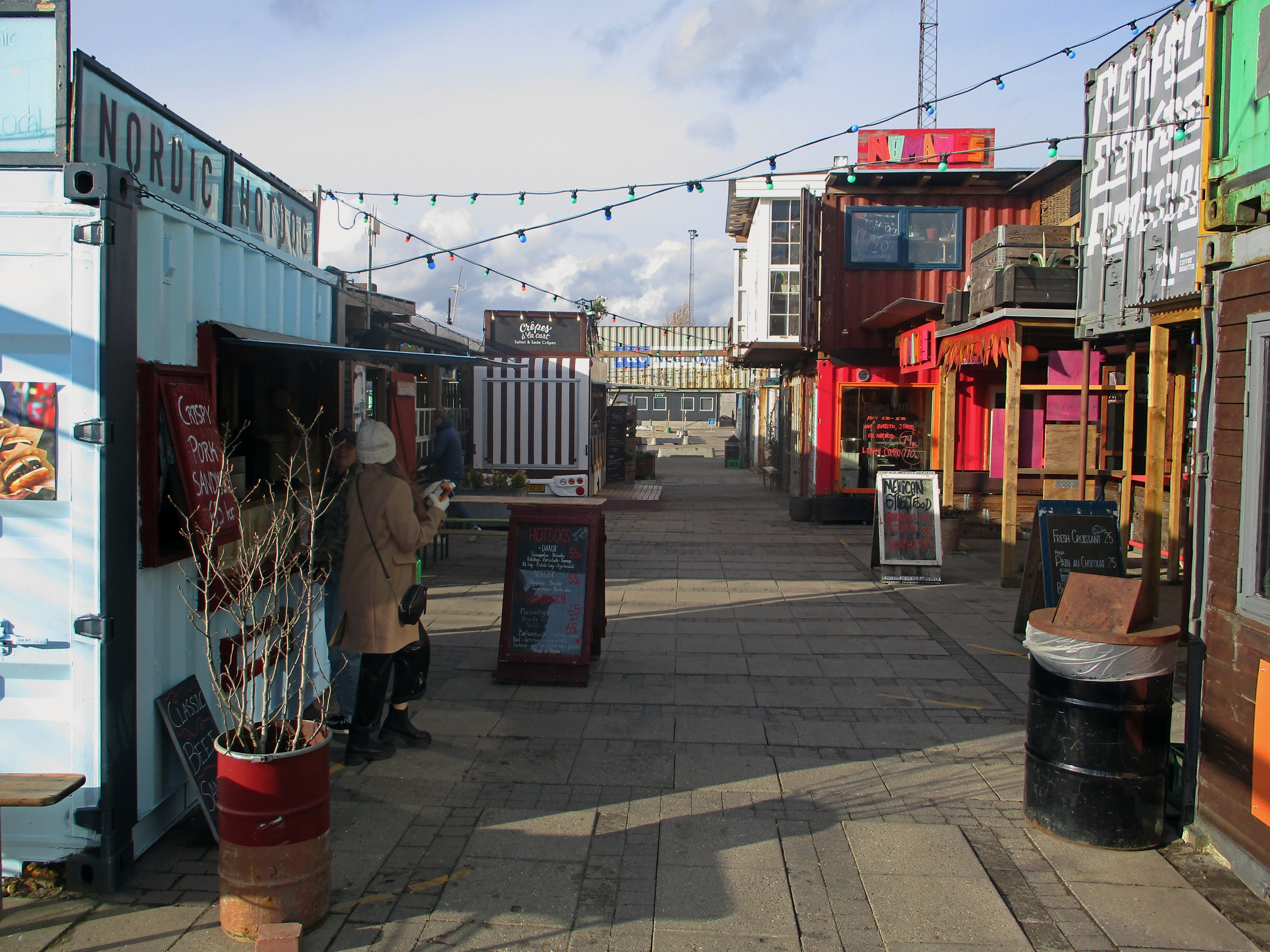
Reffen street food market.

Since the shipyard's bankruptcy in 1996, the area has undergone significant changes. The abandoned buildings are now home to a mixture of creative entrepreneurs, small craft, flea markets, storage facilities and cultural and recreational uses.

The residents include the theater Asterions Hus; the restaurant AMASS, opened by Mathew Orlando, former head chef at Noma; the art gallery YARD; and the creative community Skabelonloftet.

Since April 2011 there are again boats at the old shipyard, as Copenhagen Yacht Services opened the first Danish yacht garage on the island - an indoor marina for motorboats on the American model.

The volunteer spaceflight organization Copenhagen Suborbitals also operates on the former island.

Since May 2018 Refshaleøen is the location of Northern Europe's largest street food market Reffen with 40 different restaurants and food startups selected every three years.

== Redevelopment ==
Refshaleøen is today owned by the property company Ejendomsselskabet Refshaleøen A/S, owned by the four pension funds Sampension, PKA, PFA and Lønmodtagernes Dyrtidsfond. The site's surface area is approx. 500,000 m^{2}. In 2013, it entered into a collaboration with the energy company SE Big Blue and the Energy Academy on the island of Samsø, planning a climate-friendly neighbourhood.

== Events ==
Refshaleøen is frequently used as a venue for events and festivals. Since 2010, the area has played host to the heavy metal festival Copenhell annually in June, the Final Party of the Copenhagen Distortion festival week, the electronic music festival EDM 2013, Scandinavian Reggae Festival, MAD Symposium, Refshaleøen Music Festival and Asteroiden theatre festival.

On 2 September 2013, Danmarks Radio (DR) announced that the Eurovision Song Contest 2014 would take place at B&W Hallerne. The surrounding area was transformed into Eurovision Island, an Olympic Park-style complex which housed amenities and the press centre for the entirety of the contest. Barbadian singer-songwriter Rihanna performed on the island in 2016 during her Anti World Tour.

== See also ==
- Trekroner Fort
- Prøvestenen
