= Nyborg railway station =

Railway station in Funen, Denmark

Nyborg
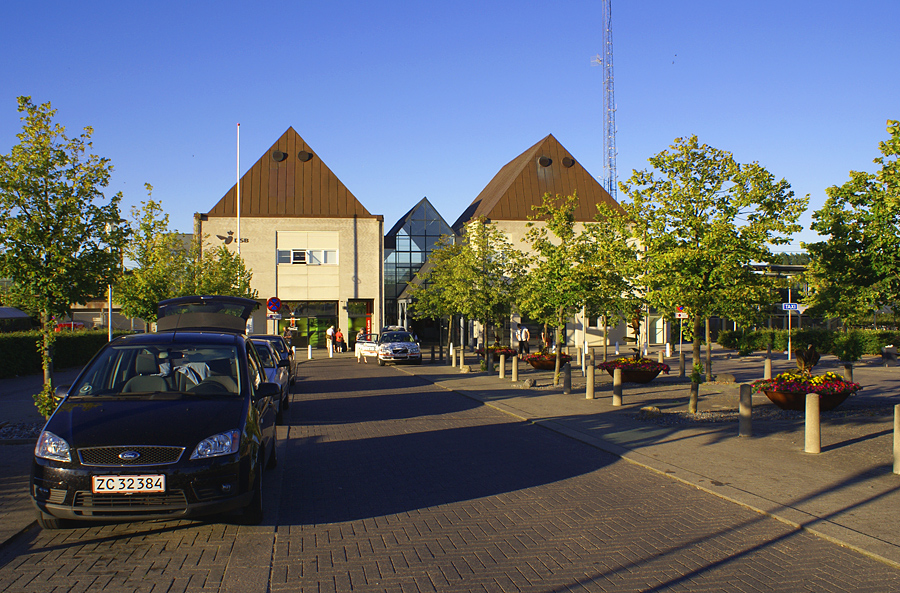
- Street facade of Nyborg station in 2008

General information
- Location: Banegårdsalleen 100; 5880 Nyborg; Nyborg Municipality; Denmark
- Coordinates: 55°18′49″N 10°48′9″E
- Elevation: 0.2 metres (7.9 in)
- Owner: DSB (station infrastructure); Banedanmark (rail infrastructure)
- Lines: Copenhagen–Fredericia (opened 1865); Svendborg–Nyborg (1897-1964); Ringe–Nyborg (1898-1962)
- Platforms: 2
- Tracks: 4
- Train operators: DSB

Construction
- Architect: Niels Peder Christian Holsøe (1865); Thomas Arboe (1891)

History
- Opened: 8 September 1865
- Rebuilt: 1871, 1891, 1 June 1997

Services
Preceding station	DSB	Following station
Korsør towards Copenhagen Central	Copenhagen-Aalborg InterCity	Langeskov towards Aalborg Airport
Korsør towards Østerport	Copenhagen–Esbjerg InterCity	Odense towards Esbjerg
Location

Nyborg railway station (Danish: Nyborg Station or Nyborg Banegård) is a railway station serving the town of Nyborg on the eastern part of the island of Funen, Denmark. It is located in the eastern part of the town, about 1 km (0.62 mi) east of the historic town centre.

Nyborg station is located on the main line Copenhagen–Fredericia railway from Copenhagen to Funen and Jutland. The station offers direct InterCity services to Copenhagen, Funen and Jutland, regional rail services to Copenhagen and Odense operated by the national railway company DSB.

The current station is the fourth station in Nyborg. The first station in the town opened in 1865 as the eastern terminus of the Funen Main Line between Nyborg and Middelfart via Odense. The original station was located closer to the harbour from where there was connection via railway ferry across the Great Belt to Korsør on the island of Zealand. Nyborg station was moved to its current location in 1997 with the opening of the railway section of the Great Belt Bridge.

== History ==
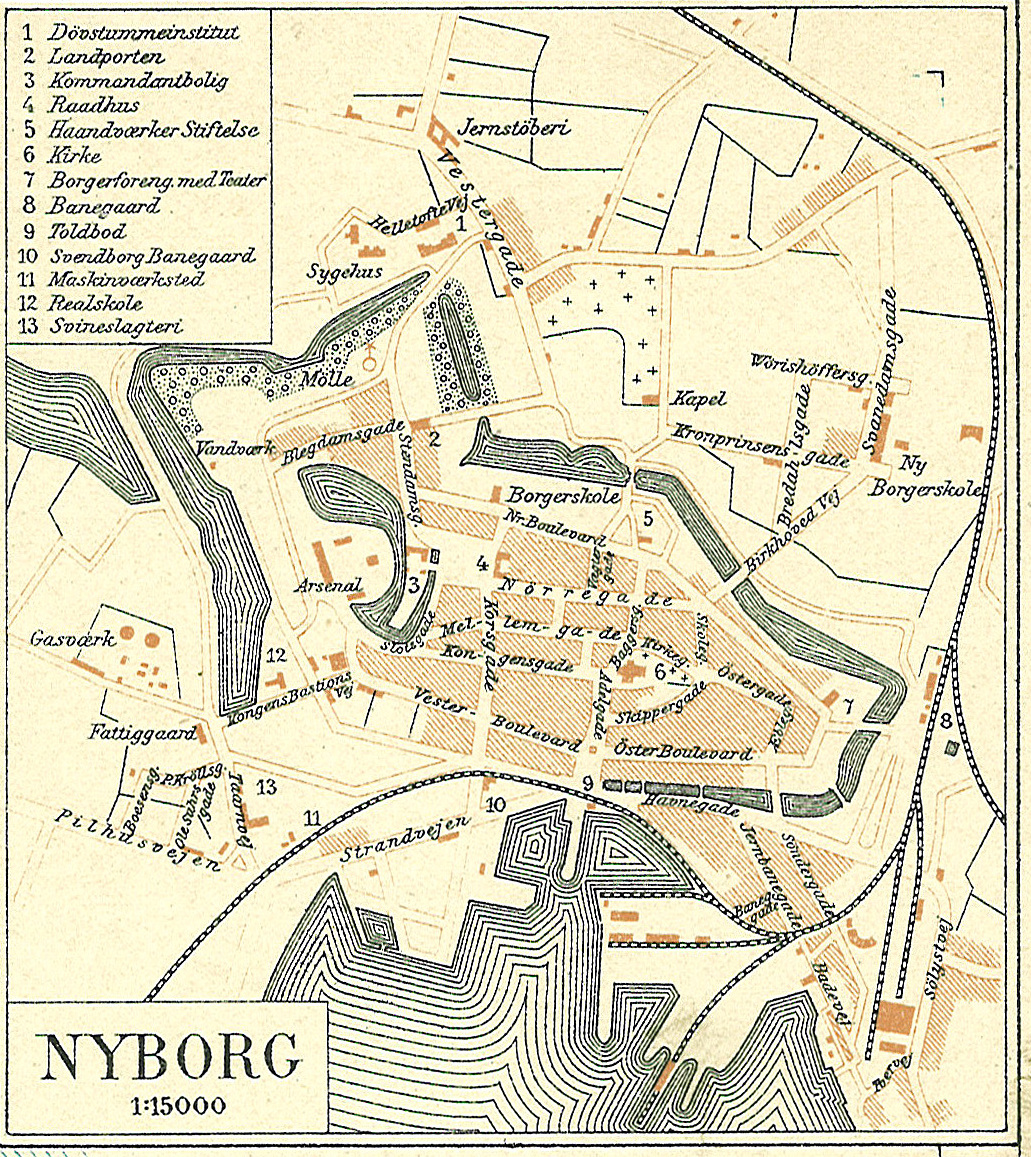
Map of Nyborg, c. 1900.

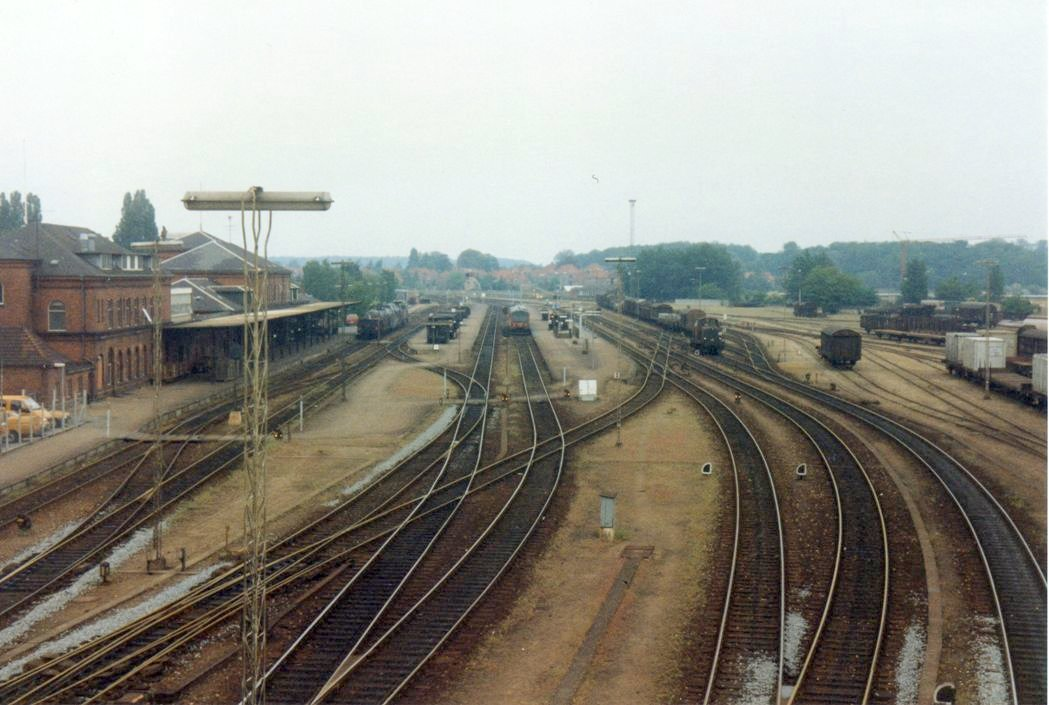
The old station in Nyborg, photographed in 1991 or 1992.

The current station is the fourth station in Nyborg. The first station in the town opened in 1865 as the eastern terminus of the Funen Main Line between Nyborg and Middelfart via Odense.

The location of the first station was impractical for the harbor and ship traffic, and when a steamship pier was built in 1871, the station was moved to a new location closer to the harbor, from where there from 1883 was connection via railway ferry across the Great Belt to Korsør on the island of Zealand.

In 1891, the third station in Nyborg opened. In 1898, the station also became the eastern terminus of the new Ringe–Nyborg railway line. In 1902, the trains on the Svendborg–Nyborg railway line (opened in 1897), also started using Nyborg station, instead of its previous station, Nyborg North. The Ringe–Nyborg railway line closed in 1962, and the Svendborg–Nyborg railway line closed in 1964.

In 1997, with the opening of the railway section of the Great Belt Bridge, Nyborg station was moved to its current location in the eastern part of the town, about 1 km (0.62 mi) east of the historic town centre.

== Architecture ==
Nyborg station's first station building was built in 1865 to designs by the Danish architect Niels Peder Christian Holsøe (1826–1895). When the station was moved in 1871, the station building was moved brick by brick to the new location. This second station building was converted into a freight station when Nyborg's third station was opened in 1891. Over the years, the building became so changed and run-down that the over one hundred year old building was demolished in 1985.

The third and still-existing station building was built in 1891 to designs by the Danish architect Thomas Arboe (1836–1917), known for the numerous railway stations he designed across Denmark in his capacity of head architect of the Danish State Railways.

== Facilities ==
Inside the station building there is a combined ticket office and convenience store operated by 7-Eleven, ticket machines, waiting room, and toilets.

Immediately adjacent to the station is a large bus terminal. The station has a bicycle parking station as well as a free long-term car park with 978 parking spaces.

== See also ==
- Transportation in Denmark
- Rail transport in Denmark
- History of rail transport in Denmark
- List of railway stations in Denmark
- Danish State Railways
- Banedanmark
