= Murder of Emilie Meng =

2016 murder in Denmark

Emilie Meng
- Born: Emilie Anine Skovgaard Meng; 31 July 1998; Korsør, Denmark
- Disappeared: 10 July 2016; Korsør Station
- Cause of death: Strangulation
- Body discovered: 24 December 2016; Regnemarks Bakke, Borup, Køge Municipality, Denmark
- Burial place: Sankt Povls Kirke
- Known for: Murder victim
- Height: 1.68 m (5 ft 6 in)

Emilie Anine Skovgaard Meng (31 July 1998 – c. 10 July 2016) was a girl from Korsør, Denmark, who went missing in the early hours of 10 July 2016 from Korsør railway station after a night out with friends. Following a highly publicised search involving police and civilians, her body was discovered on 24 December 2016 in Regnemarks Bakke, Borup, Køge Municipality. A post-mortem examination determined that she had been strangled.

Philip Patrick Westh, a 32-year-old marketing manager, was charged with Meng's murder in April 2023. In June 2024, he was sentenced to life imprisonment for her murder, along with the abduction and rape of another girl and the attempted abduction of a third.

== Disappearance ==
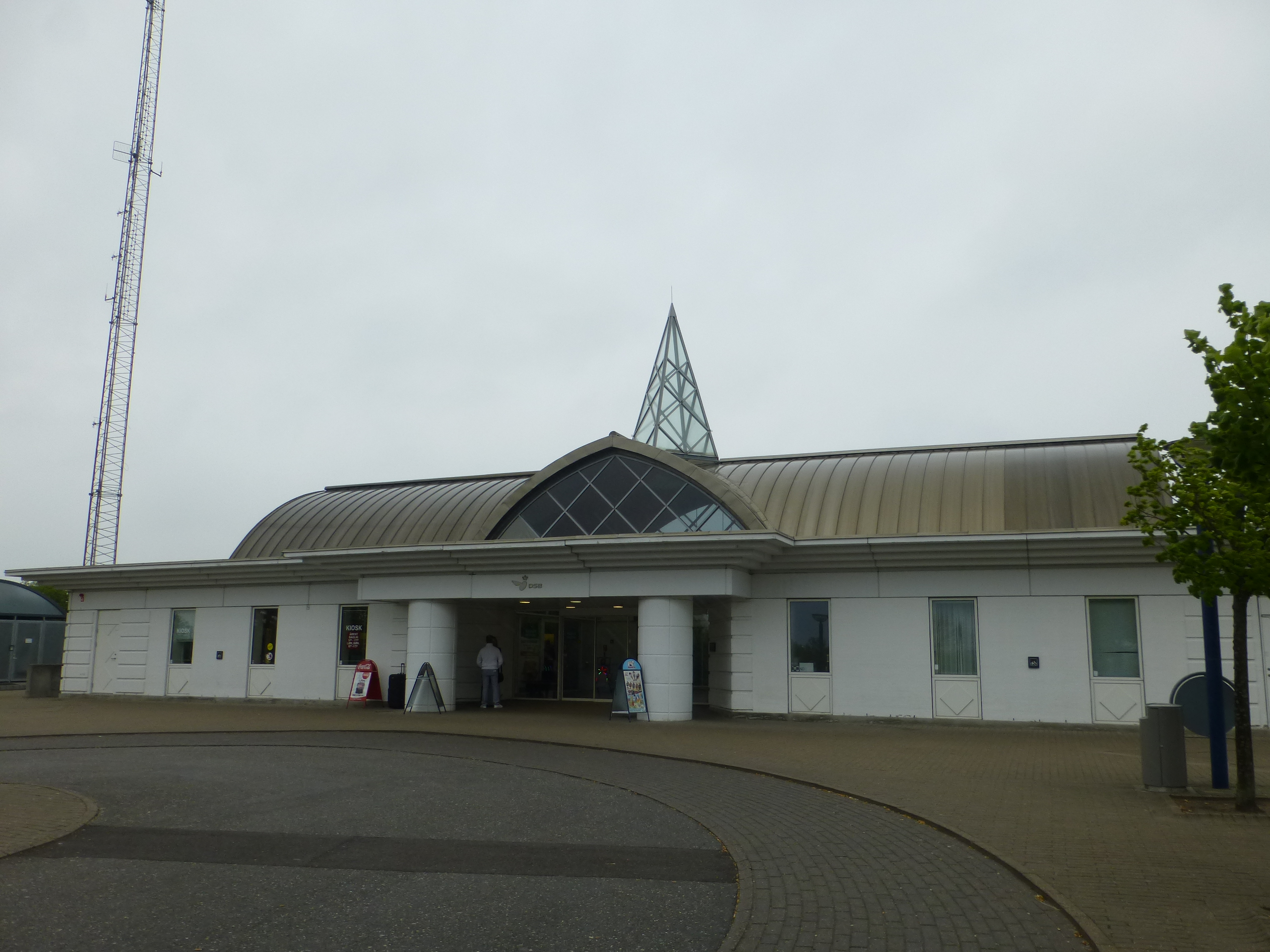
Street façade of Korsør Station, where Meng was last seen alive (photographed in 2015).

Meng was last seen walking home alone on foot from Korsør Station where she and friends arrived at 4 a.m. on 10 July 2016 after a night out in Slagelse. She was expected to sing at a local church at 9:30 that morning, but never showed up. Many volunteers helped the police to look for Meng. Several tips led to three suspects, including a 33-year-old truck driver, and a 67-year-old whose house was searched five times, but they were later released. After four months, police operated on three theories: Meng had run away, was involved in an accident, or was the victim of a crime. During the 168 days she was missing, volunteers hung up missing person posters across the nation, with hundreds of volunteers also searching for Meng.

== Discovery of Meng's body ==
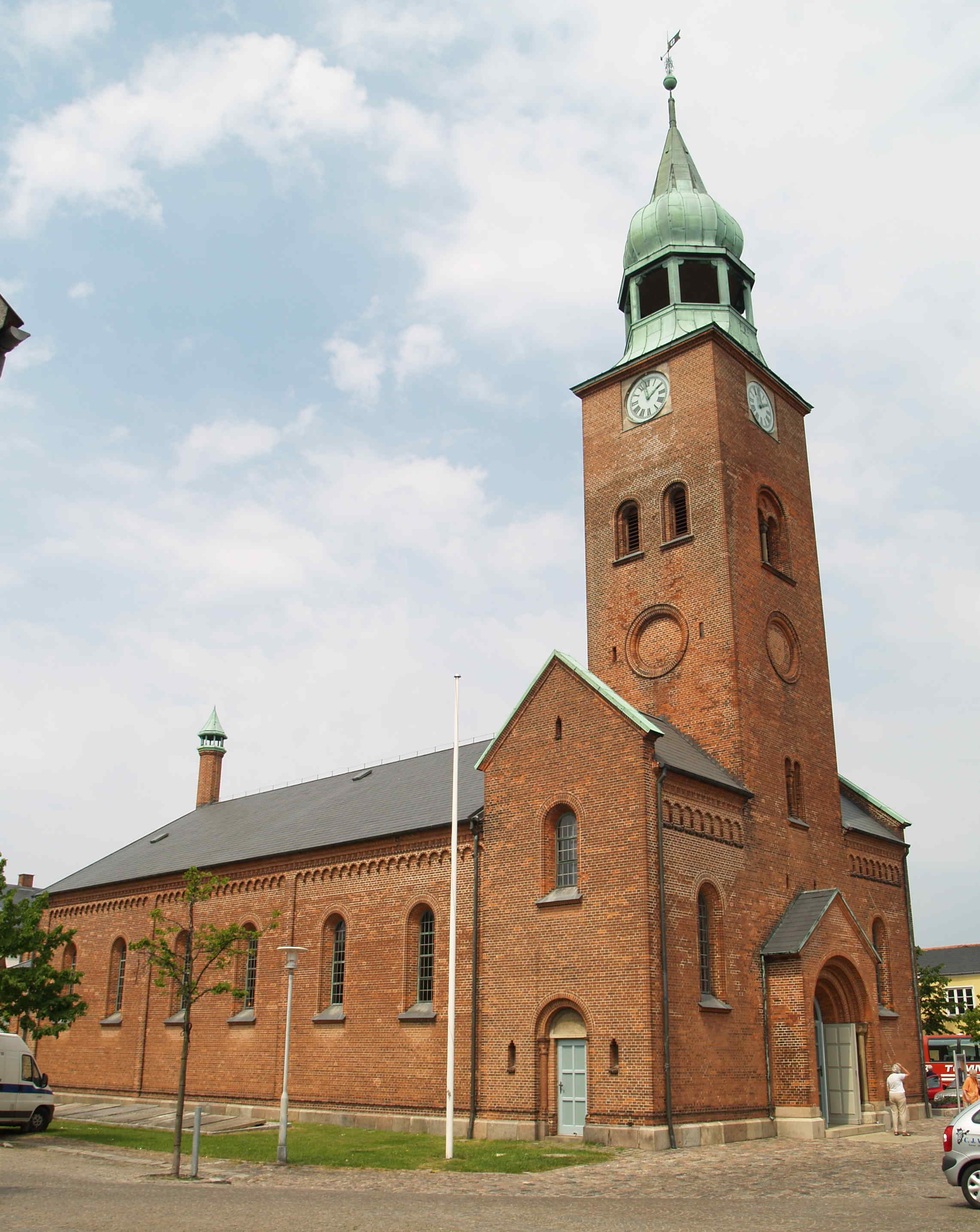
Korsør Church where Meng was buried.

On 24 December 2016, Meng's body was found in a lake at Regnemarks Bakke near Borup in Køge Municipality. Police authorities cordoned off and investigated the scene. Police announced at a press conference the following evening that Meng had been the victim of a very serious crime. Investigation by police of evidence and mobile traffic from the area where Meng disappeared and where she was found took place.

On 26 December, a memorial service was held at Korsør Station; it was attended by several hundred people, including the mayor of Slagelse Municipality, Stén Knuth. On 30 December, Meng's family requested the removal of all missing person posters, since she had now been found. Her funeral was held on 19 January 2017 in St. Povl's Church in Korsør. She was buried in Korsør Church cemetery.

In June 2017, the South Zealand and Lolland-Falster Police published the results of technical examinations of a surveillance recording from Korsør Station. The police's reconstruction of the video showed footage of an indoor corridor, in addition to a view of the station's car park. Quite faintly, a bright passenger car could be seen driving around at about 4:07 a.m. on 10 July 2016. The poor quality of the video made it difficult to determine the car's model, but, following several months of work abroad, it was an expert's assessment that it most likely was a Hyundai i30, model 2011–2016. By then, police had interrogated roughly 650 people in the case, written close to 2,000 reports and compared approximately 400,000 cars with telephone information.

In 2021, Danish police confiscated a white van that at the time of Meng's murder had belonged to Peter Madsen, a Danish convicted murderer for the 2017 killing of Swedish journalist Kim Wall, unsuccessfully looking for possible traces of blood in the vehicle.

== 2023 Kirkerup child abduction ==
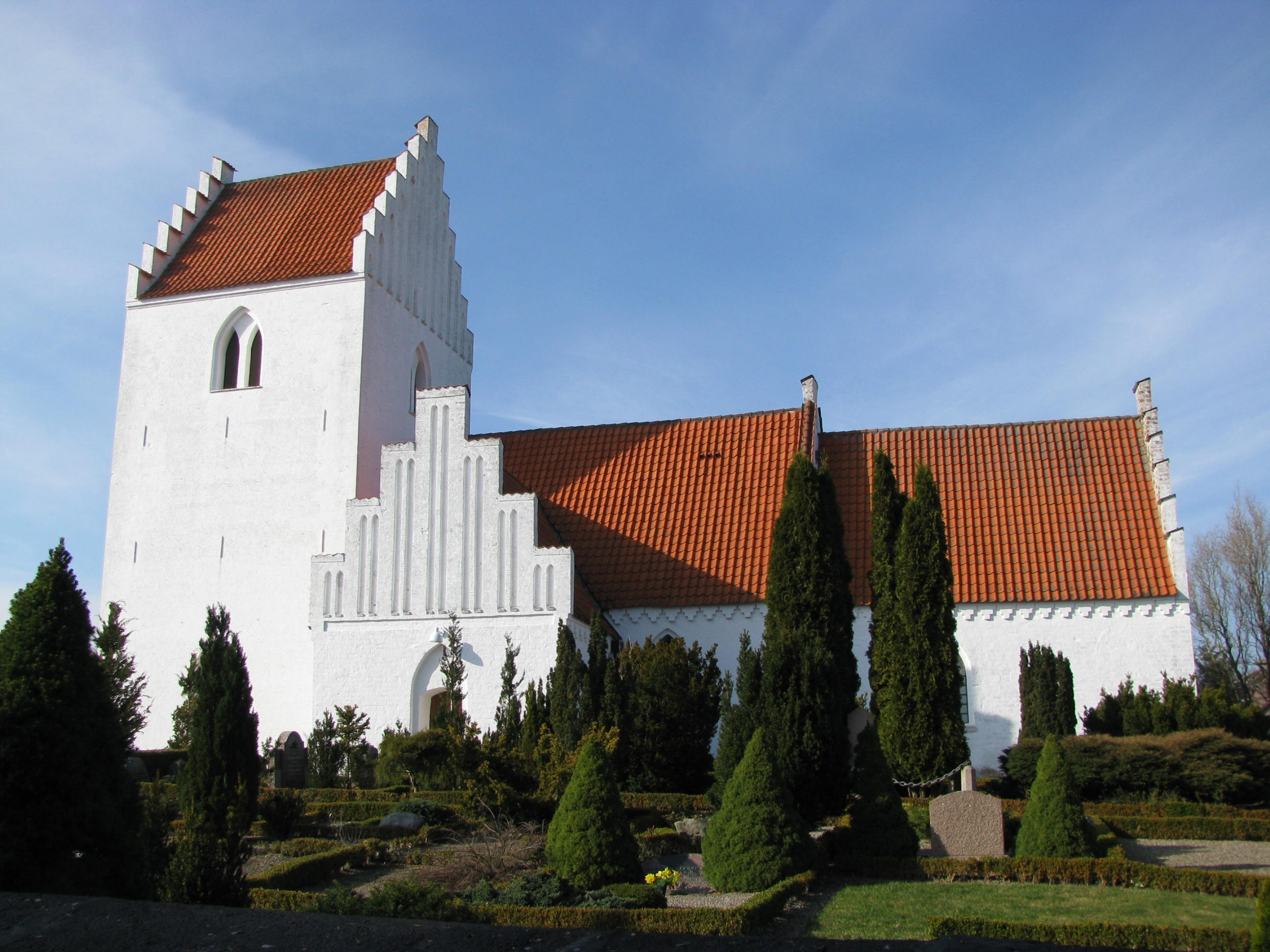
Kirkerup Church near the scene of the child abduction which lead to the apprehension of Meng's suspected murderer.

On 15 April 2023, at about 11:45 a.m. local time, a 13-year-old girl disappeared in Kirkerup, Slagelse Municipality, after finishing delivery of newspapers to the surrounding area. The same day, police, cooperating with other authorities, used dogs, drones, and helicopters to secure evidence. A local property was cordoned off on the following morning. At 10:57 a.m., police authorities stated they were working based on the assumption that a crime had been committed. The event drew intensive media coverage in Denmark toward the otherwise relatively unknown village. Early in the afternoon, police called for a press conference to be held at 3:00 p.m.

After a brief delay, police inspector Kim Kliver announced that, shortly before the conference was to have begun, a 32-year-old man had been arrested at his house in Svenstrup, Korsør, where the missing girl had been found alive and conscious. Her mother wrote, "27 hours of nightmare is over and my dearly beloved (Victim's Name) is home," in addition to Danish prime minister Mette Frederiksen, expressing her gratitude. Norwegian NRK journalist Søren Arildsen later described the event as follows: "A country that had held its breath for 27 hours could exhale. Almost all of Denmark had become involved. But primarily the local community." Two other persons had also been arrested but released the same day because of their innocence. By Sunday morning, the police had received 600 inquiries from locals about the case, including dashcam recordings. Connection to the murder of Meng was at this point not publicly known; it was not confirmed by police until 24 April.

== Trial ==
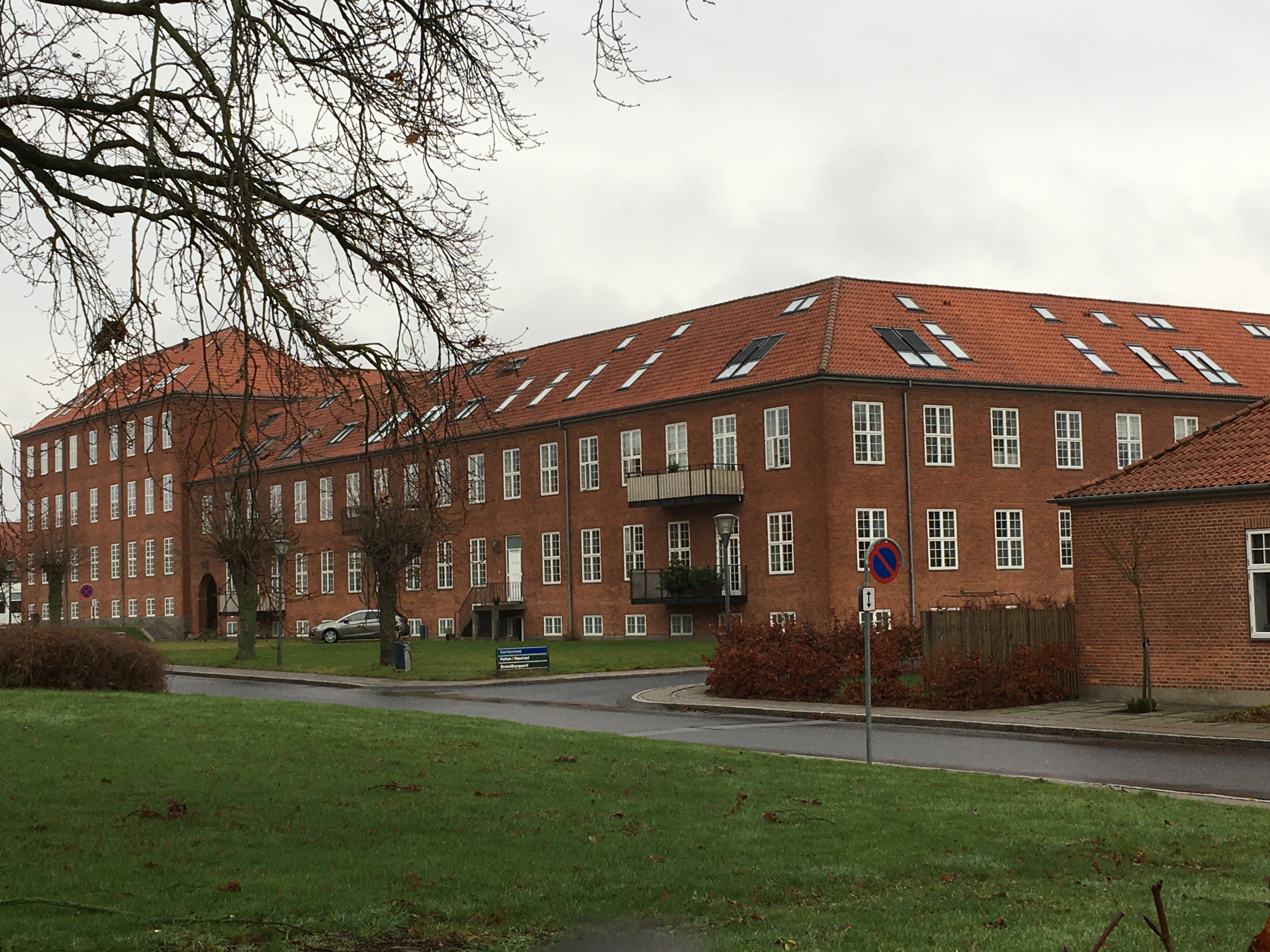
Retten i Næstved (Court of Næstved) where legal proceedings against the 32-year-old took place.

On 18 April, the 32-year-old defendant was arraigned (grundlovsforhør) at the Court of Næstved charged with at 11:46 am on 15 April, having initiated a long-lasting deprivation of liberty as well as committed violence, threats of violence, and several rapes against the 13-year-old. He pleaded "partly guilty" and was pre-trial detained until 11 May, with his name being prohibited from public release. The judge argued for the detention partly by reason of the probability that other perpetrators could be at large. Despite the name ban (which is normal in serious cases in Denmark and automatically removed once a person has been convicted), the defendant's name persisted circulating on social media.

On 24 April, the B.T. reported that police had seized a white Hyundai i30 in Slovakia which the defendant had sold to a Slovak family in 2016; the same model as the one sought after by police in 2016 regarding Meng's murder. At a press convention held by South Zealand and Lolland-Falster Police on 26 April, it was announced that the 32-year-old had been charged with Meng's murder, as well as another unsolved crime in Sorø committed during November 2022. The same day, it was confirmed by police that the 32-year-old back in 2016 had been involved in Meng's murder case and was among the 1,450 individuals who the police had collated DNA from, but the DNA sample collected from the victim was too degraded and mixed to get a result with the methods existing at the time.

On 9 May, the defendant voluntarily prolonged his detention.

On 24 April 2024, the name ban against the now 33-year-old defendant Philip Patrick Westh was lifted.

Westh's trial began on 14 May 2024 at Næstved Court House. There, he admitted long-term kidnapping, sexual relationship other than intercourse, illegal coercion and violence against the 13-year-old girl. She was bound with plastic strips when the police found her at Westh's residence. He also admitted possession of child pornography. He pleaded not guilty to the rest of the charges, which included attempted murder against the 13-year-old, murder of Emilie Meng and attempted rape and kidnapping of a 15-year-old Efterskole student in Sorø.

In June, Westh was found guilty of the murder of Emilie Meng and the abductions of two other girls, and was sentenced to life imprisonment. Westh's attorney announced that the ruling would be appealed. In late 2025, Westh withdrew his appeal. In May 2026, he confessed to the murder of Emilie Meng.

== Legacy ==
The case was widely reported in the media. Three years after her disappearance, on 22 August 2019, television station TV 2 published a documentary named Hvor er politiet? (Where are the police?) A few months later, broadcaster DR released a documentary series titled Emilie Meng – en efterforskning går galt (Emilie Meng – an investigation goes wrong). During two seasons in 2019 and 2020, the B.T. made 22 episodes of the podcast series Emilie Meng Mysteriet (The Emilie Meng Mystery). In August 2020, a true crime book titled Pigen der forsvandt (The girl who disappeared) authored by Jesper Vestergaard Larsen and Bo Nordström Weile was published by People's Press. In 2021, a four-episode documentary by streaming service Discovery+ premiered under the name Nogen ved noget om Emilie Meng (Someone knows something about Emilie Meng). A Netflix documentary entitled A Friend, a Murderer came out on March 5, 2026.

== See also ==
- List of solved missing person cases (post-2000)
- List of unsolved murders (2000–present)
