= Korsør railway station =

Railway station in Slagelse Municipality, Denmark

Korsør
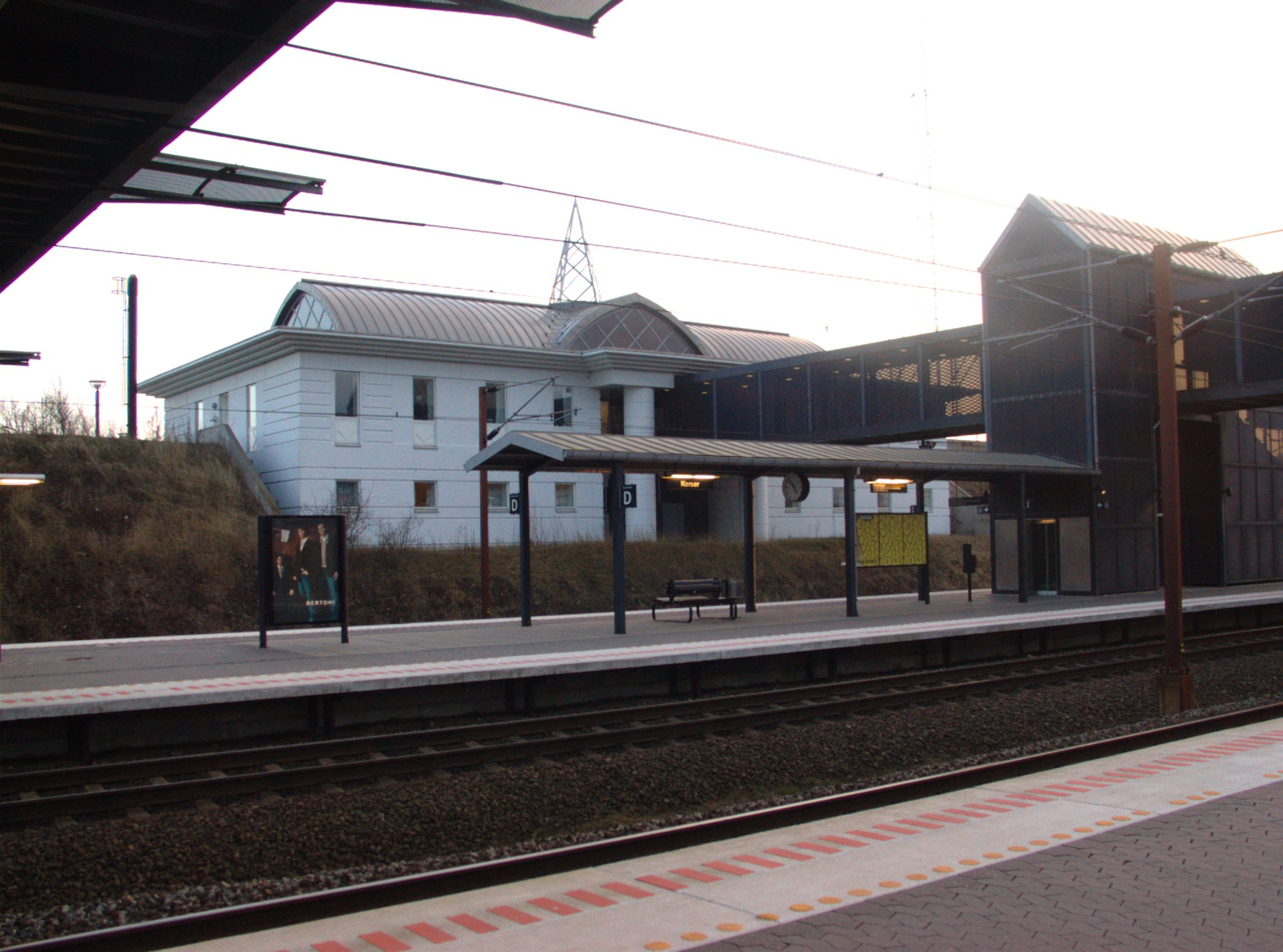
- Korsør station in 2002

General information
- Location: Storebæltsvej 2; 4220 Korsør; Slagelse Municipality; Denmark
- Coordinates: 55°21′24.19″N 11°8′7.53″E
- Elevation: 6.0 metres (19.7 ft)
- Owner: DSB (station infrastructure); Banedanmark (rail infrastructure)
- Line: Copenhagen–Fredericia Line
- Platforms: 2
- Tracks: 4
- Train operators: DSB

Construction
- Architect: Heinrich Wenck

History
- Opened: 27 April 1856
- Rebuilt: 1907; 1 June 1997

Services
Preceding station	DSB	Following station
Slagelse towards Copenhagen Central	Copenhagen-Aalborg InterCity	Nyborg towards Aalborg Airport
Slagelse towards Østerport	Copenhagen–Esbjerg InterCity	Nyborg towards Esbjerg
Location

Korsør railway station (Danish: Korsør Station or previously Korsør Banegård) is a railway station serving the town of Korsør in southwestern Zealand, Denmark. It is located in the northern part of the town, about 3 km (1.9 mi) north of the historic town centre.

Korsør station is located on the main line Copenhagen–Fredericia railway from Copenhagen to Funen and Jutland. The station opened in 1856 as the western terminus of the Vestbanen railway line from Copenhagen to Korsør. The original station was located by the harbour from where there was connection via railway ferry across the Great Belt to Nyborg on the island of Funen. Korsør station was moved to its current location in 1997 with the opening of the railway section of the Great Belt Bridge.

The station offers direct InterCity services to Copenhagen, Funen and Jutland, regional rail services to Copenhagen and Odense operated by the national railway company DSB.

== Architecture ==
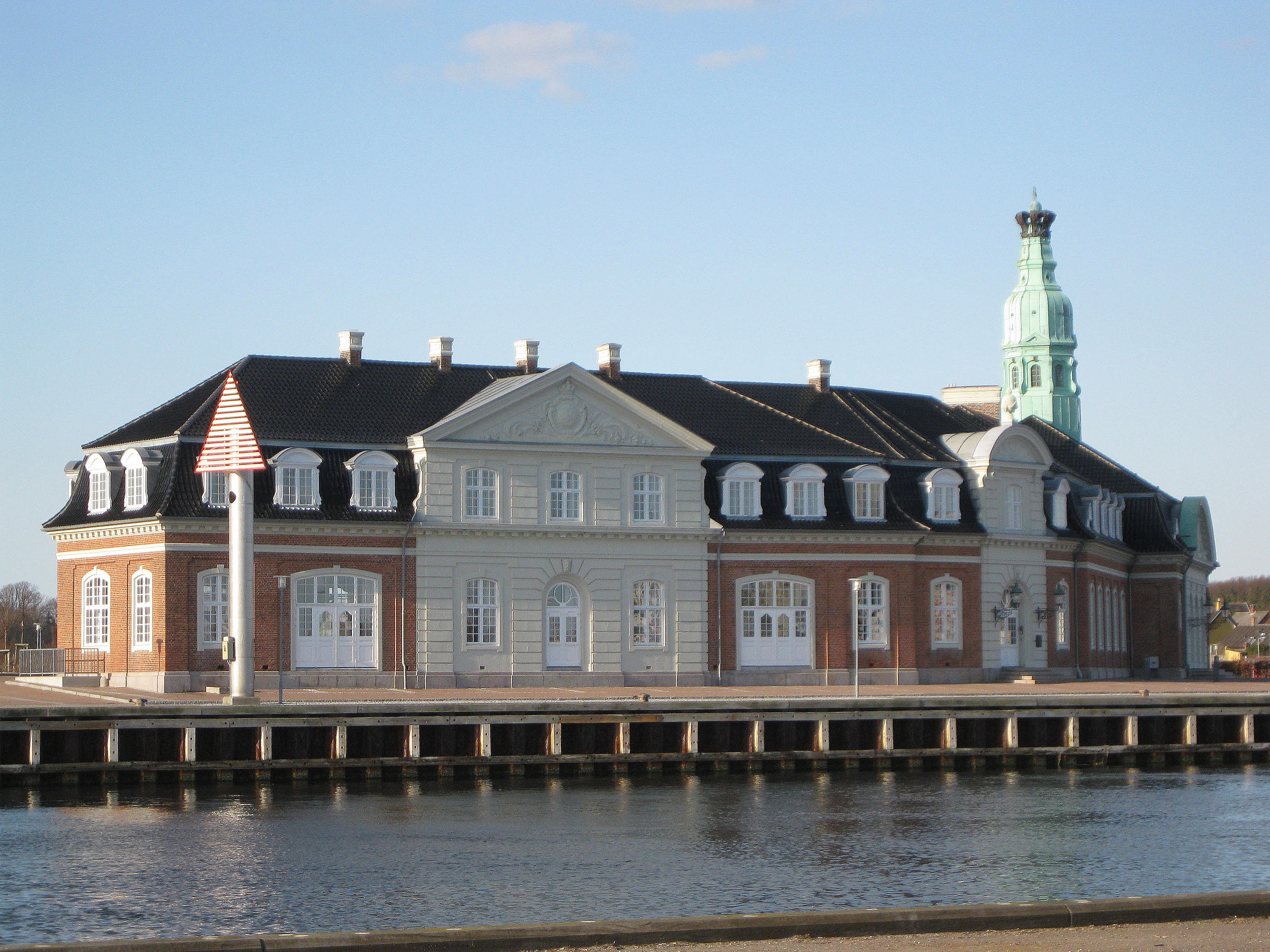
The old station building in 2015

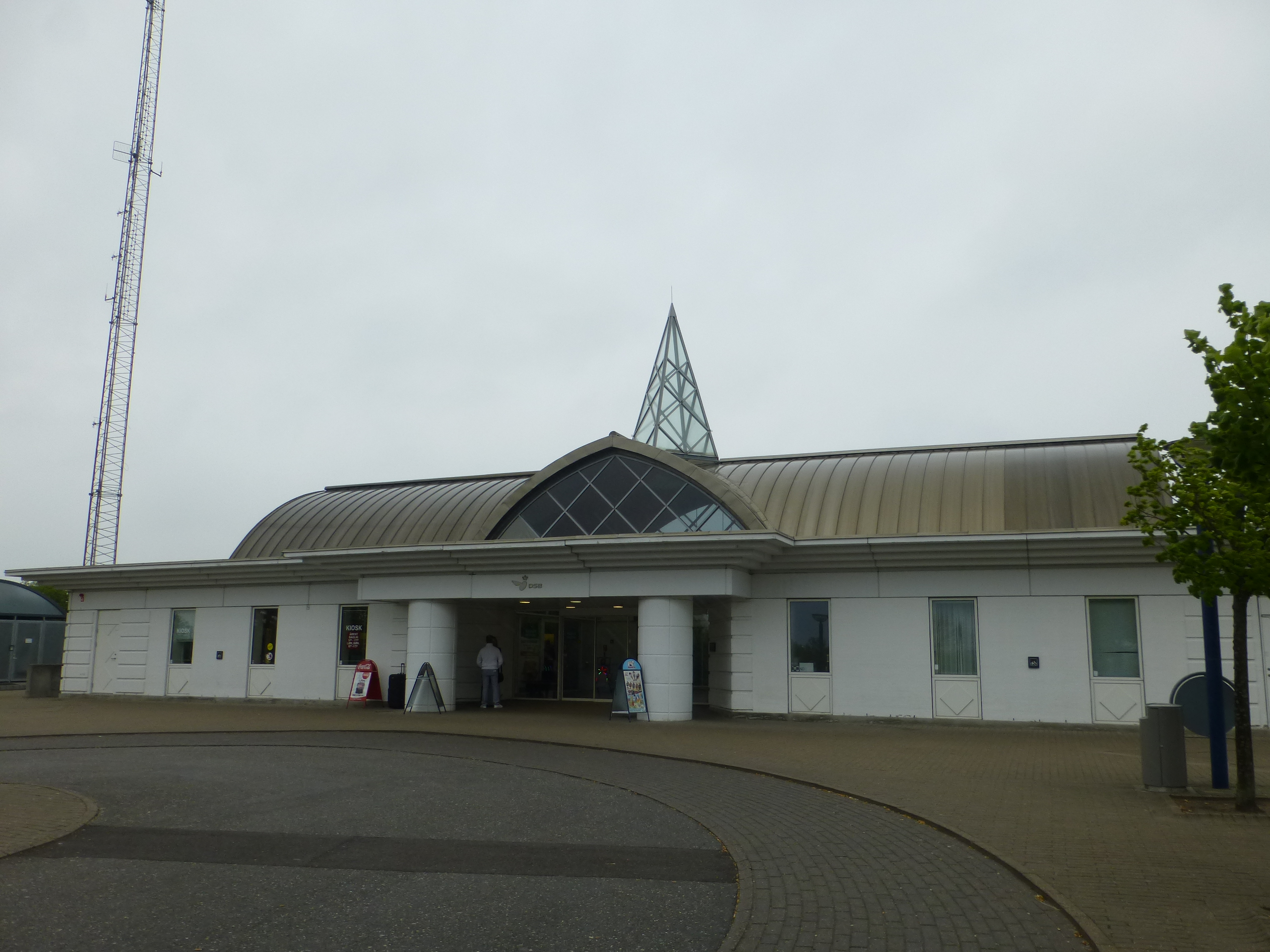
Street facade of Korsør station in 2015

Korsør station's second and still-existing station building was built in 1907 to designs by the Danish architect Heinrich Wenck (1851–1936), known for the numerous railway stations he designed across Denmark in his capacity of head architect of the Danish State Railways. The station building was listed in the Danish registry of protected buildings and places in 1992.

== See also ==
- List of railway stations in Denmark
