= The Tempest (Sibelius) =

Incidental music by Jean Sibelius

- Theatre score & suites by Jean Sibelius
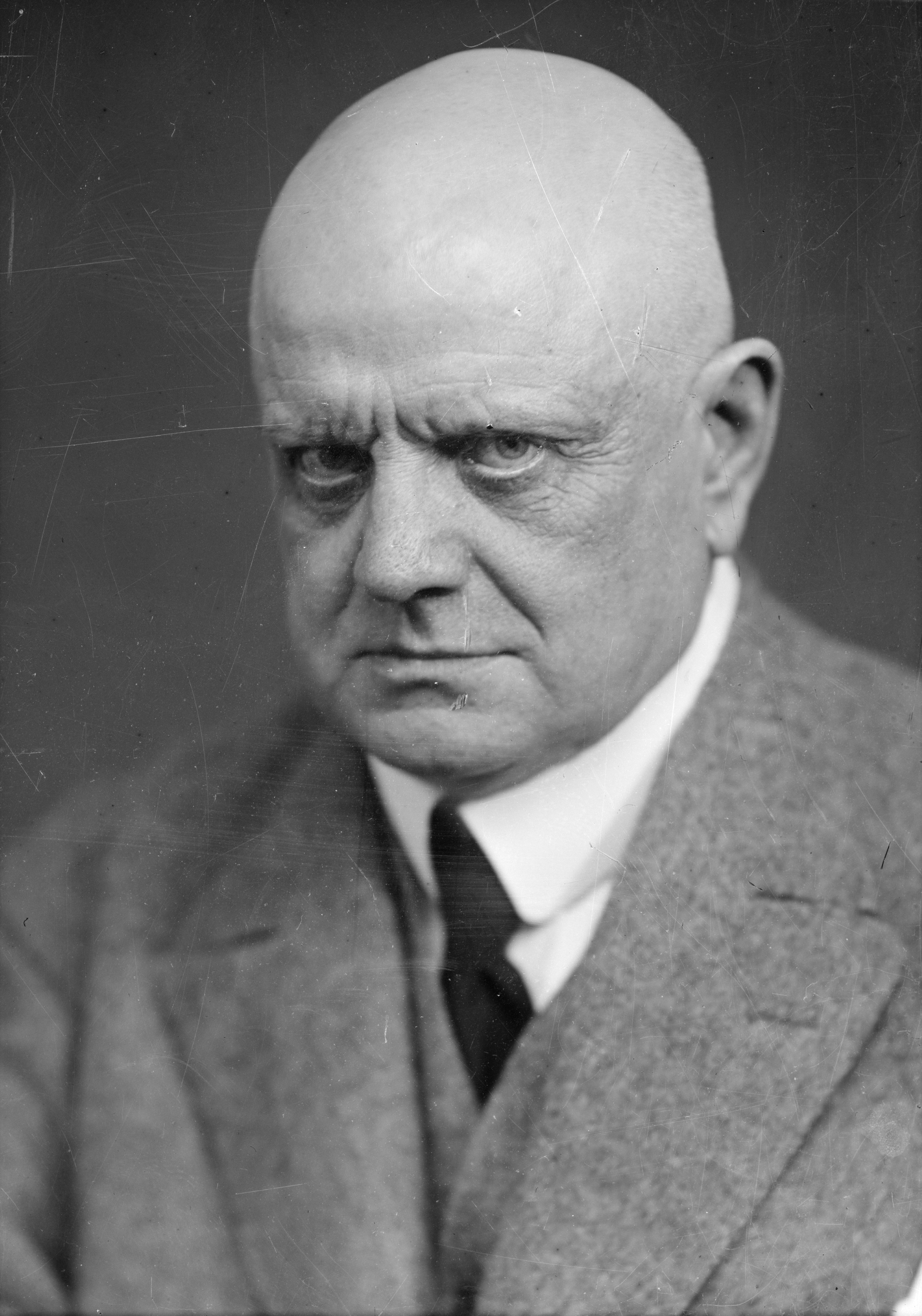
- The composer (c. 1927)
- Native name: Stormen
- Catalogue: JS 182 (full score)
- Opus: 109/1 (prelude); 109/2–3 (suites)
- Text: play by William Shakespeare
- Language: Danish (trans. English)
- Composed: 1925, rev. & arr. 1927
- Publisher: Hansen (1929, Opp. 109/1 and 3; 1930, Op. 109/2)
- Movements: 36 (JS 182); 1 (Op. 109/1); 9 (Op. 109/2); 9 (Op. 109/3)

Premiere
- Date: 16 March 1926
- Location: Royal Theatre; Copenhagen, Denmark
- Conductor: Johan Hye-Knudsen

The Tempest (Stormen), Op. 109, is incidental music by Jean Sibelius to Shakespeare's The Tempest. He composed it mainly in the late summer 1925, his last major work before his tone poem Tapiola. Sibelius derived two suites from the score.

The music is said to display an astounding richness of imagination and inventive capacity, and is considered by some as one of Sibelius's greatest achievements. He represented individual characters through instrumentation choices: particularly admired was his use of harps and percussion to represent Prospero, said to capture the "resonant ambiguity of the character".

== History ==
Sibelius had completed his 7th Symphony, which was to be his last, in 1924. The Tempest and Tapiola were to be his last great works, and he wrote little else for the remaining 32 years of his life, which came to be known as "The Silence of Järvenpää".

The idea for music for The Tempest was first suggested to Sibelius in 1901, by his friend Axel Carpelan. In 1925, his Danish publisher Wilhelm Hansen again raised the idea, as the Royal Theatre in Copenhagen was going to stage the work the following year, directed by Adam Poulsen. Sibelius wrote it from the autumn of 1925 through to the early part of 1926, during which time he turned 60. (Although according to Sibelius's journal, he was working on some minor additions and changes music in May 1927.)

The complete music lasts for over an hour. It originally consisted of 34 pieces, for vocalists, mixed-voice choir, harmonium and orchestra. It was first performed in Copenhagen on 15 March 1926. The first night attracted international attention but Sibelius was not present. Reviews noted that "Shakespeare and Sibelius, these two geniuses, have finally found one another", and praised in particular the part played by the music and stage sets. Only four days later Sibelius set off for an extended trip to work on new commissions in Rome. He did not hear the music for the first time until the autumn of 1927 when the Finnish National Theatre in Helsinki staged the work. For this performance, he composed an alternative epilogue, bringing the number of items to 35.

The overture has been described as "the single most onomatopoetic stretch of music ever composed". Sibelius published the Overture as a separate piece, and arranged two suites from the music, comprising 19 pieces. These suites condensed and combined items from the stage music, sometimes in ways that obscure the drama. It is in the form of these suites that the music has been most frequently heard in the concert hall and on recordings. Various recordings do not stick to the formal suites but include other items.

The complete incidental music was not recorded for the first time until 1992, by the Lahti Symphony Orchestra, Lahti Opera Chorus, and soloists under Osmo Vänskä, as part of the complete recordings of all Sibelius's works. Recordings of the suites include those by Sir Thomas Beecham, Sir Charles Groves, Horst Stein, Leif Segerstam and Michael Stern.

== Structure of the Incidental Music ==
- No. 1. Overture
- Act 1
  - No. 2, Miranda Falls Asleep
  - No. 3, Ariel Flies In
  - No. 4, Chorus of the Winds
  - No. 5, Ariel Hurries Away
  - No. 6, Ariel's First Song with introduction and chorus
  - No. 7, Ariel's Second Song
- Act 2
  - No. 8, Interlude
  - No. 9, The Oak Tree
  - No. 10, Ariel's Third Song
  - No. 11, Interlude
  - No. 12, Stephano's Song
  - No. 13, Caliban's Song
- Act 3
  - No. 14, Interlude
  - No. 15 Humoreske
  - No. 16, Canon
  - No. 17, Devils' Dance
  - No. 18, Ariel as a Harpy
  - No. 19, Dance II [The Devils Dance Away]
  - No. 20, Intermezzo
- Act 4
  - No. 21, Ariel Flies In [= No. 3]
  - No. 22, Ariel's Fourth Song
  - No. 23, The Rainbow
  - No. 24, Iris's Recitation
  - No. 25, Juno's Song
  - No. 26, Dance of the Naiads
  - No. 27, The Harvester
  - No. 28, Ariel Flies In [= No. 3]
  - No. 29, Ariel Flies Off [= No. 5]
  - No. 30, Ariel Flies In
  - No. 31, The Dogs
- Act 5
  - No. 31bis, Overture
  - No. 32 Intrada
  - No. 33, Ariel's Fifth Song
  - No. 34, Cortège
  - No. 34bis, Epilogue.

== Structure of the suites ==
The references in brackets are to the origin of the music in the original score.

Suite No. 1 for Piano, Op. 109/2

- 1. The Oak (No. 18, Ariel as a Harpy, followed by No. 9, The Oak Tree)
- 2. Humoreske (No. 15)
- 3. Caliban's Song (No. 13)
- 4. The Harvesters (No. 19, Dance II The Devils Dance Away; No. 27, The Harvester)
- 5. Canon (No. 16)
- 6. Scene (No. 11, Interlude; No. 31, The Dogs)
- 7a. Intrada (No. 32)
- 7b. Berceuse (No. 2, Miranda Falls Asleep)
- 8a. Interlude (No, 23, The Rainbow)
- 8b. Ariel's Song (No. 7, Ariel's Second Song)
- 9. Overture (No. 1)

Suite No. 2 for Piano, Op. 109/3

- 1. Chorus of the Winds (No. 4)
- 2. Intermezzo (No. 20)
- 3. Dance of Nymphs (No. 26, Dance of the Naiads)
- 4. Prospero (No. 8, Interlude)
- 5. Song I (No. 22, Ariel's Fourth Song)
- 6. Song II (No. 31 bis, Overture; No. 33, Ariel's Fifth Song)
- 7. Miranda (No. 14, Interlude)
- 8. The Naiads (No. 6, Ariel's First Song)
- 9. Dance Episode (No. 17, Devils' Dance)
