= Slipshavn =

Danish peninsula

Coordinates: 55°17′12″N 10°49′32″E

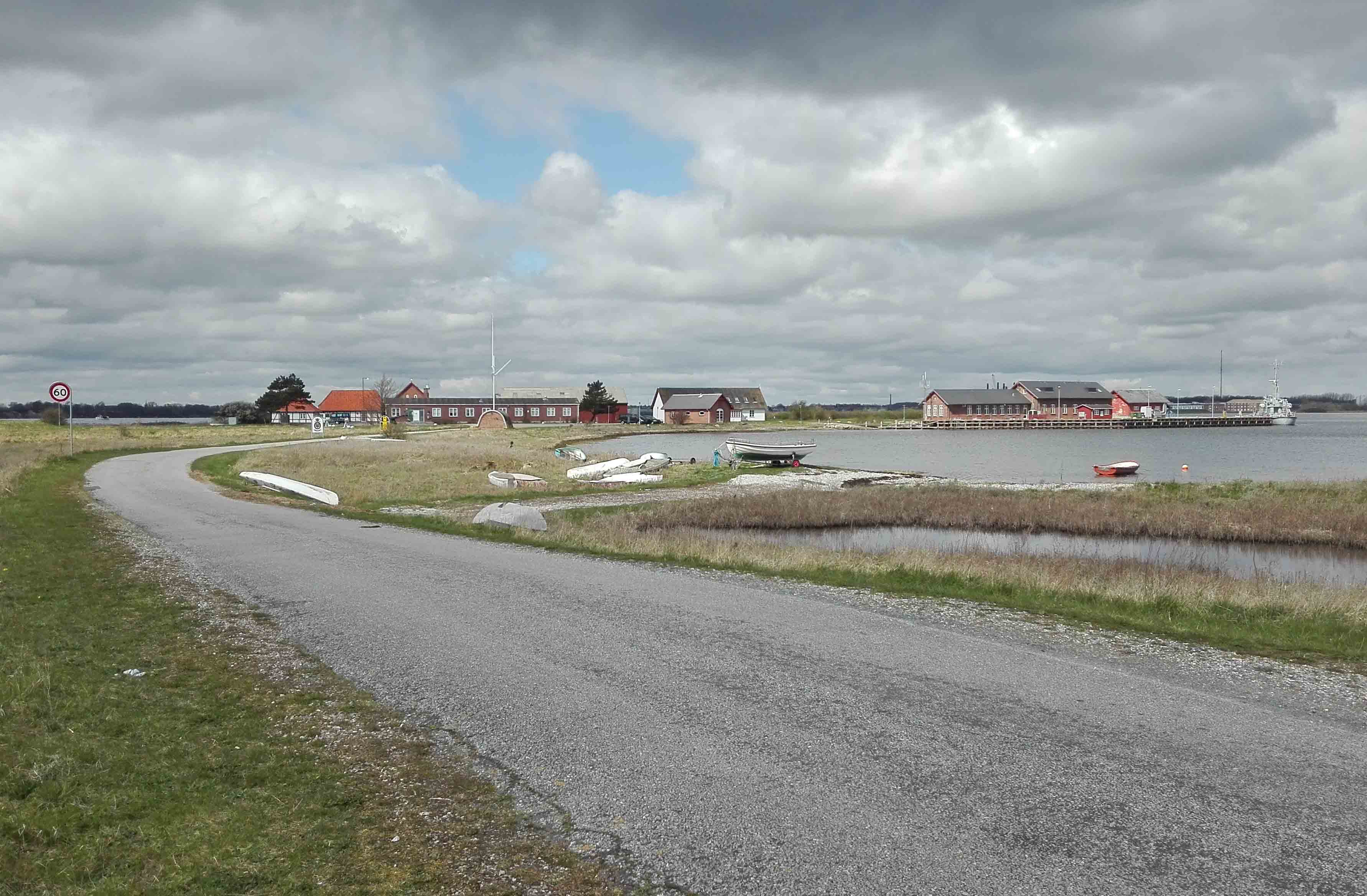
Slipshavn

Slipshavn is a peninsula off the east coast of Funen, Denmark. Together with Knudshoved to the north, it forms a natural harbor at Nyborg Fjord.

== History ==
A sconce was constructed at the site in 1556–57, which was used as a base by the naval ships guarding the traffic between Funen and Zealand. The fortification was expanded to its current state between 1801 and 1808. It was also used as a check point until the abolishment of the sound dues in 1857. Following the outbreak of World War I, a base for seaplanes and submarines opened on the peninsula in 1916. After the end of the war, it was only used sporadically by small naval vessels and aircraft. During World War II, Slipshavn was used by the occupying German forces. Since the late 1940s, it has been used by the Danish Home Defense and since 1956 by the Danish Naval Home Defense.

== Today ==
The peninsula is now home to an educational facility operated by the Naval Home Defense. A wooden hangar from 1916 is still seen at the site.
