= Agent Storm =

Agent Storm may refer to:

- Agent Storm: My Life Inside al-Qaeda
- J. W. Storm
