= Hedda Lundh =

Danish journalist and schoolteacher, resistance fighter during World War II

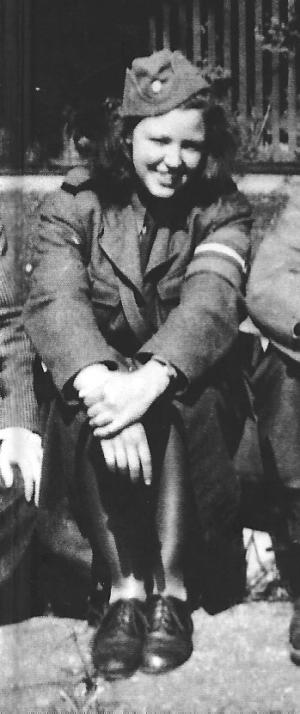
Hedda Lundh

Hedda Lundh (1921–2012) was a Danish journalist and schoolteacher who, under the German occupation of Denmark in World War II, was a Danish resistance fighter. Based at the time in Aarhus, she is remembered as a railway saboteur, explosives expert and courier in the resistance movement.

== Early life ==
Born on 29 September 1921 in Korsør, Hedda Lundh was the daughter of the newspaper editor Theodor Lundh-Jensen (1884–1952) and Alpha Tusnelda Emilie Winckler (1887–1973). The youngest of three sisters, she was brought up in a middle-class home where her father called her his "boy" as she climbed trees, joined the scouts and cut her hair short. She completed her secondary school education at Aurehøj Gymnasium, matriculating in 1940, a few months after the German troops arrived. She then began to study literature at the University of Copenhagen. On 28 December 1940, she married Carl-Einar Maaløe. When her husband began to work in Aarhus in 1942, she continued her studies at Aarhus University.

== Resistance work ==
It was in Aarhus that she joined an independent group of students under Morten Ruge who carried out sabotage work on the railways. They later joined the official Aarhus resistance movement under the leadership of Willy Samsing. Lundh became so proficient in handling explosives that she was sent to train other resistance members. There were also other women in Lundh's group, all helping to distribute weapons and explosives parachuted in by the British, sending them to resistance groups throughout Denmark. Lundh also acted as a telephone contact, forming part of a network of resistance workers whose addresses were kept secret from each other.

In June 1944, the two groups Lundh had been involved in were discovered by the Gestapo. Most of the male members were sent to concentration camps in Germany while the women were imprisoned near Padborg. By a stroke of luck, Lundh and her husband avoided arrest and fled to Sweden where they spent the remainder of the war. Maaløe became a member of the Danish Brigade but, as a woman, Lundh was not allowed to join.

== Post-war career ==
After the war, Lundh continued her studies, graduating with an MA in literature in 1952. From 1949 to 1960, based mainly in Paris, she covered cultural events for Social-Demokraten, worked for the press service at the Danish embassy, and taught in French high schools. In 1962, she returned to Aurehøj Gymnasium as a teacher. She was recognized as an inspiring teacher who made literature lessons surprisingly exciting.

Hedda Lundh died on 2 March 2012 and is buried in Gentofte Cemetery.
