= Pernille Weiss =

Danish politician and businesswoman (born 1968)

Pernille Weiss MEP
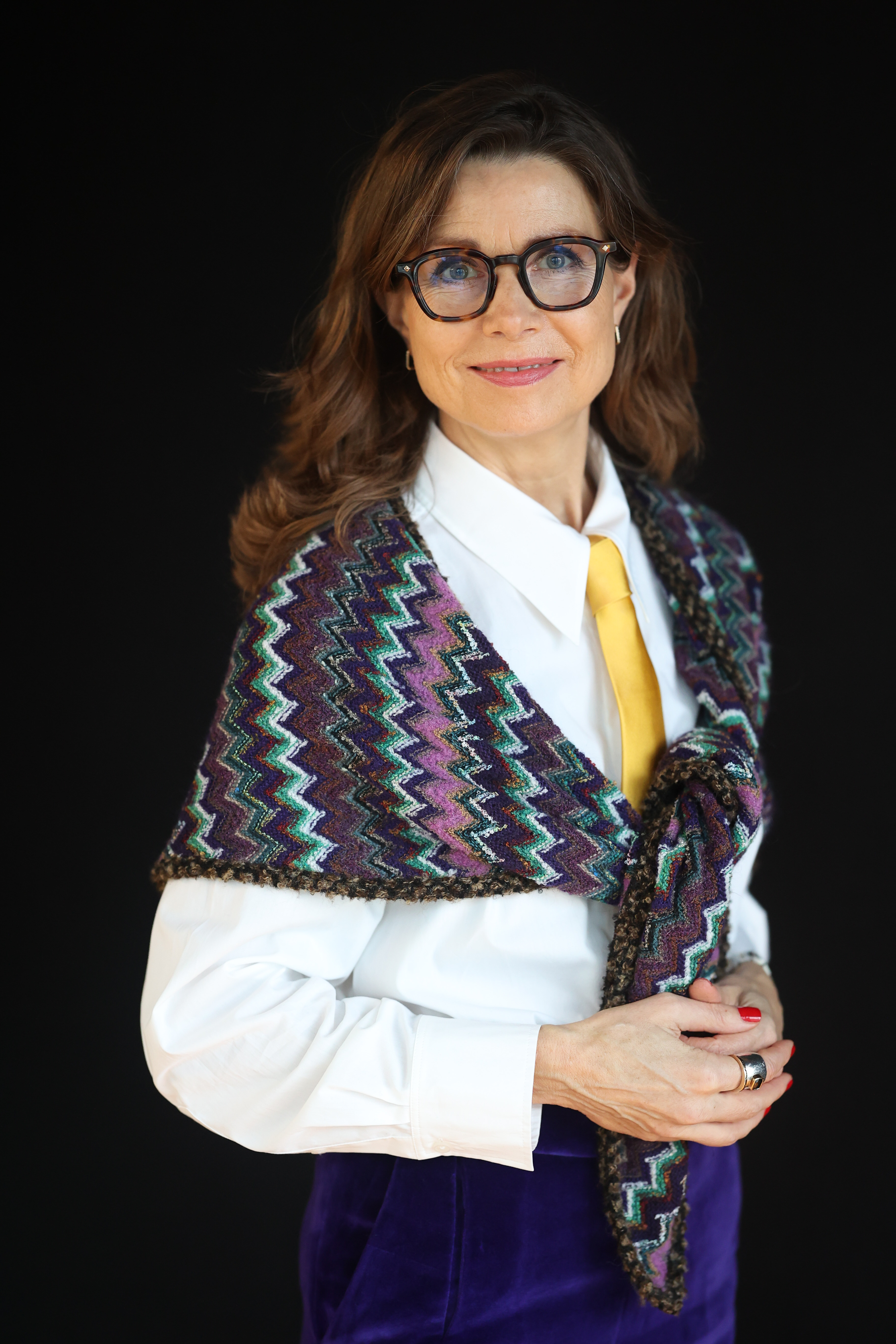

Member of the European Parliament for Denmark
- Incumbent
- Assumed office 2 July 2019

Personal details
- Born: 12 March 1968 (age 58) Middelfart, Denmark
- Party: Conservative People's Party
- Children: 3
- Education: Odense School of Nursing; University of Southern Denmark; Copenhagen Business School
- Profession: Politician, businesswoman
- Website: https://pernilleweiss.dk/

Pernille Weiss (born 12 March 1968) is a Danish politician and businesswoman who was elected as a Conservative People's Party (part of the EPP Group) Member of the European Parliament (MEP) in the 2019 European parliamentary election in Denmark. She is the chief executive officer of Archimed, a healthcare and architectural consultancy.

== Early life and career ==
Pernille Weiss was born on 12 March 1968 in Gamborg, Middelfart. She grew up in Funen. Her early education was at the Middelfart Gymnasium. Weiss joined the Conservative People's Party at the age of 15. She qualified as a nurse in 1992 from the Odense School of Nursing in Funen and later specialised in forensic nursing. From 1996 to 2004 she was a member of the Funen County Council. Weiss obtained a Cand.scient. in Health Sciences from the University of Southern Denmark in 2004.

Four years later, Weiss gained a master's degree in Leadership and Innovation from Copenhagen Business School. In the same year, she founded Archimed, a healthcare, and architectural consultancy. She is its chief executive officer. Weiss had previously worked for consulting firm COWI and architectural firm Arkitema. In 2017, she became a certified sexologist.

== Member of the European Parliament ==
Weiss stood as a candidate in the 2019 European parliamentary election for the Conservative People's Party. She was first on her party's list. Weiss was elected as its sole MEP in Denmark.

In the European Parliament, Weiss is part of the European People's Party Group. Since 2019, she has been serving on the Committee on Industry, Research, and Energy. In this capacity, she has been the parliament's rapporteur on the European Union's Pharmaceutical Directive (2023) and the Waste Shipment Regulation (2023).

In addition to her committee assignments, Weiss is part of the delegation to the ACP–EU Joint Parliamentary Assembly. She is also a member of the European Parliament Intergroup on Climate Change, Biodiversity and Sustainable Development, the European Parliament Intergroup on Small and Medium-Sized Enterprises (SMEs), the European Parliament Intergroup on LGBT Rights and the MEP Interest Group on Obesity & Health System Resilience.

In May 2023, an internal investigation uncovered reports of bullying in Weiss’ office. Shortly after, the Conservative People's Party under its leader Søren Pape Poulsen announced that it would not nominate her as a candidate for the 2024 European Parliament election. Weiss appealed the decision at the party's annual conference in Herning on 23 September, where it was affirmed with 440 delegates' votes for and 145 against.

== Political positions ==
Weiss has described her priorities in the parliament to be to strengthen the European Union's energy and climate policy, and controls on immigration.

== Personal life ==
Weiss has been married twice and has three children.
