= Aage Giødesen =

Danish artist

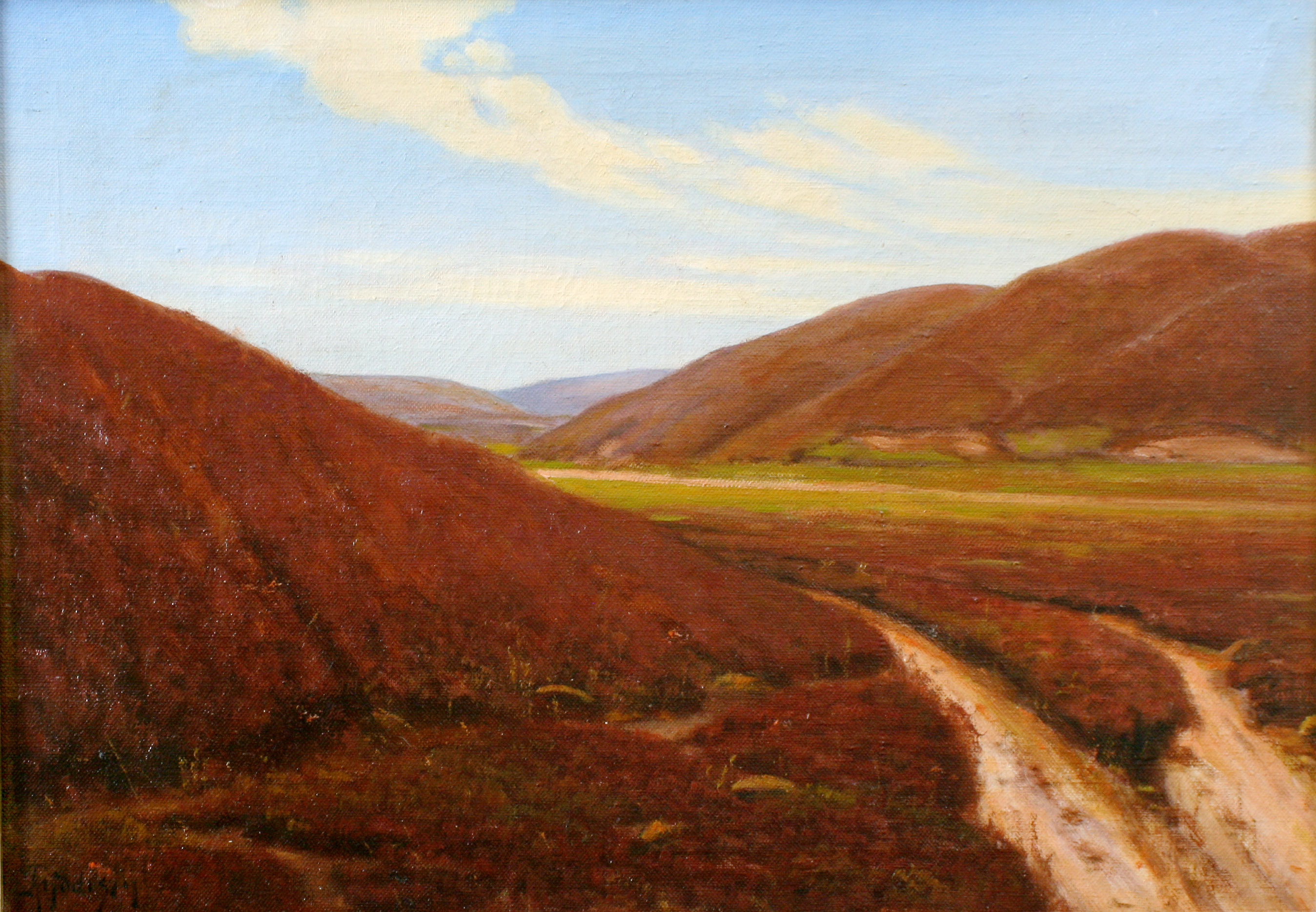
Landscape. Oil on canvas 12¾ × 18½ inches. Aage Giødesen developed a painting technique that displayed a gloss and brightness that some compared to glass painting.

Aage Giødesen (September 1, 1863 – August 4, 1939) was a Danish painter who worked in the late 19th and early 20th centuries. He is mainly known for landscapes, as well as for portraits and marine subjects.

== Biography ==
Giødesen was born in the Danish port town of Korsør. He was the son of Navy Commander Peter Ferdinand Giødesen (1829-1905) and Laura Susanne Georgine Storch (1830-1922). He studied at the Royal Danish Academy of Fine Arts (Det Kongelige Danske Kunstakademi) in Copenhagen, where he was a student of Frederik Vermehren, Carl Heinrich Bloch, and Carl F. Andersen. He was employed as a Professor of Drawing at the Royal Danish Naval Academy (Søværnets Officersskole) from the spring of 1886 until 1907.

Giødesen traveled throughout Europe, including Germany in 1884-86, 1888, 1890; Sweden several times from 1889, the Netherlands, Switzerland, Italy in 1890, Belgium, the Mediterranean, North Africa, Greece, Asia Minor, and the Black Sea in 1893. He exhibited widely, notably at the Chicago World's Fair in 1893 and at the official exhibition gallery of the Royal Danish Academy of Art and Charlottenborg Exhibition Hall (Kunsthal Charlottenborg).
