= Sextus Miskow =

Danish singer

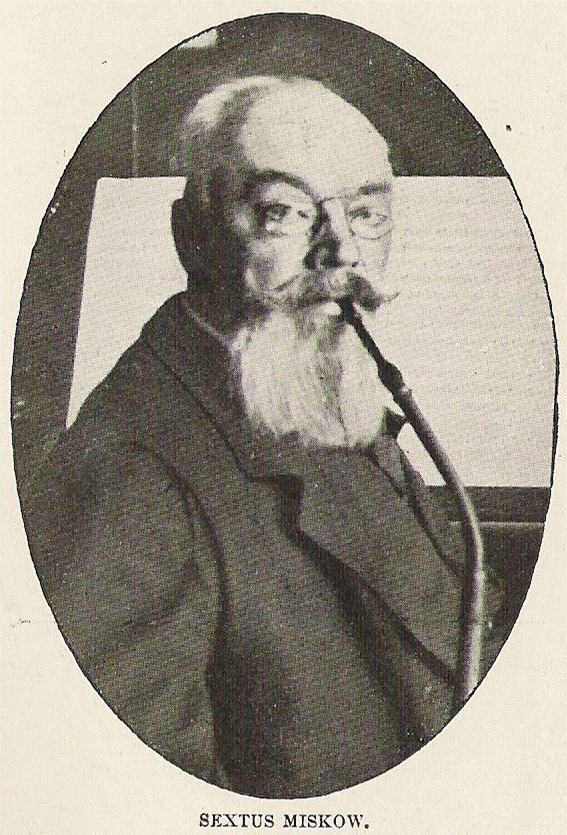
Sextus Miskow

Sextus Miskow (3 February 1857 – 24 November 1928) was a Danish singer, composer and music critic.

== Biography ==
Miskow was born in Nyborg, on the island of Funen, Denmark. After two years in military school starting in 1871, Miskow continued his studies in violin and piano. From 1876 to 1879, was taught at the Royal Danish Academy of Music. Here he concentrated on singing lessons with Carl Helsted (1837–1893). He also trained under pianist Edmund Neupert (1842–1888) and violinist Christian Schiørring (1837–1893). In 1885 and 1886, he received additional training in Vienna.

He made his debut as a bass singer at the Danish Royal Theatre in 1880. He was never on the staff of the theater and worked since as a singing teacher and as a concert singer. At times he was also a music critic, including for Berlingske Tidende, Denmark's oldest newspaper, from 1903 to 1914, and choral conductor of the Copenhagen Workers' Choir, which he founded in 1915.

Most of his musical composition are forgotten today. He is most associated with one of his first songs, Den spillemand snapped fiolen fra væg, with lyrics by Holger Drachmann (1846–1908). The song still appears in new Danish songbooks and is recorded by today's artists. Allegretto Fantasia for clarinet and piano by Miskow appears in "Concert and Contest", a widely used collection of intermediate level clarinet solos compiled and edited by Himie Voxman. Because of this it is a popular number on the Internet, where it can be heard in several versions.

== Music (not complete) ==
- Songs on Wikisource
- Nocturne (string orchestra, 2 horns and 2 bassoons)
- Snow White (Singspiel with Christian Danning)
- Tinderbox (Singspiel)
- Karl Knight Rise (Singspiel)
- The prisoner at Sønderborg (orchestra and soloist)
- Piano Pieces
- a sonata for violin and piano
- Three Pieces for clarinet and piano
- 50 songs
- A performance of Allegretto fantasia

== Other Sources ==
- Artikel i Dansk biografisk Leksikon
- Gerhardt Lynge: Danske Komponister (1917)
- Sextus Miskow: Det var dengang (selvbiografi 1926)
- Sextus Miskow: Pelikohl eller saa galt gik det (selvbiografi 1928)
