= Casper Henningsen =

Danish footballer and businessman (born 1985)

Personal information
- Full name: Casper Henningsen
- Date of birth: 6 July 1985 (age 41)
- Place of birth: Korsør, Denmark
- Height: 1.85 m (6 ft 1 in)
- Position: Winger

Senior career*
Years	Team	Apps	(Gls)
2003–2006	Slagelse B&I	115	(43)
2007–2008	Silkeborg IF	19	(8)
2009–2012	AB	77	(12)
2012–2013	FC Vestsjælland	42	(6)
2013–2014	Brønshøj BK	32	(8)
2014–2017	Fremad Amager	0	(0)
2014–2017	Brønshøj BK	13	(1)
- * Club domestic league appearances and goals as of 17 February 2015

Casper Henningsen (born 6 July 1985) is the CEO of UserTribe. Henningsen was previously a Danish professional football player who played at Silkeborg in the Danish Superliga.

== Career ==
=== Soccer ===
Henningsen began his soccer career in 2000 when he joined F.C. Copenhagen’s youth team at 15. In 2006 he turned pro when he moved to Silkeborg IF. Henningsen played professionally for six years, transferring to Brønshøj BK before retiring in 2012.

=== Commercial ===
In 2010, Henningsen began his transition into the commercial world, working full time at Mindjumpers and playing soccer full time. Henningsen officially retired from soccer in 2012 when he joined Kunde & Co. In 2015 he became, at age 30, the youngest ever managing partner there.

Henningsen joined UserTribe in 2017 as their Chief Commercial Officer and overtook the CEO role from Jonas Alexandersson in 2018.
