= Thomas Arboe =

Danish architect (1836–1917)

Thomas Arboe (22 September 1836 – 8 February 1917) was a Danish architect.

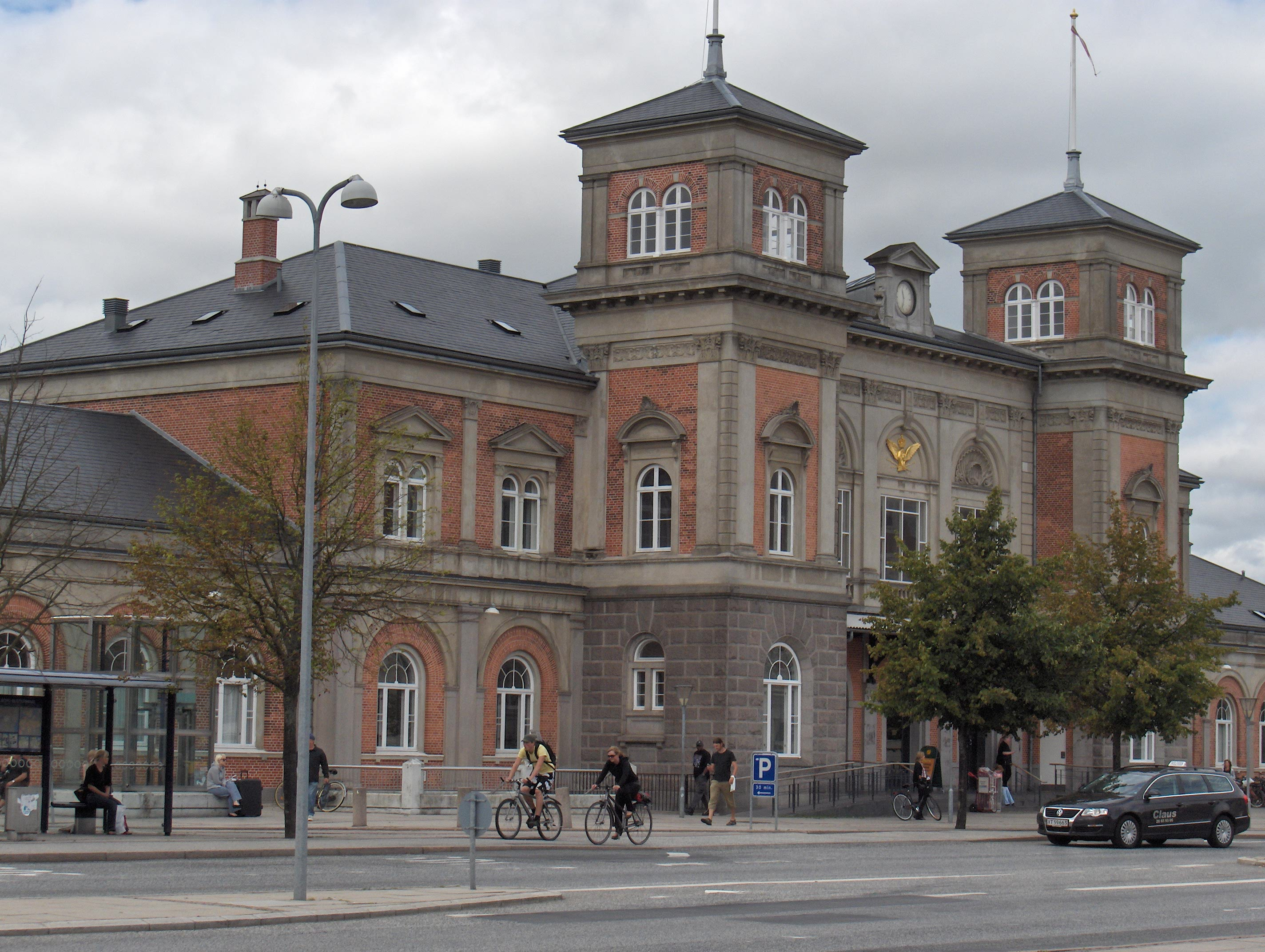
Aalborg railway station (1902)

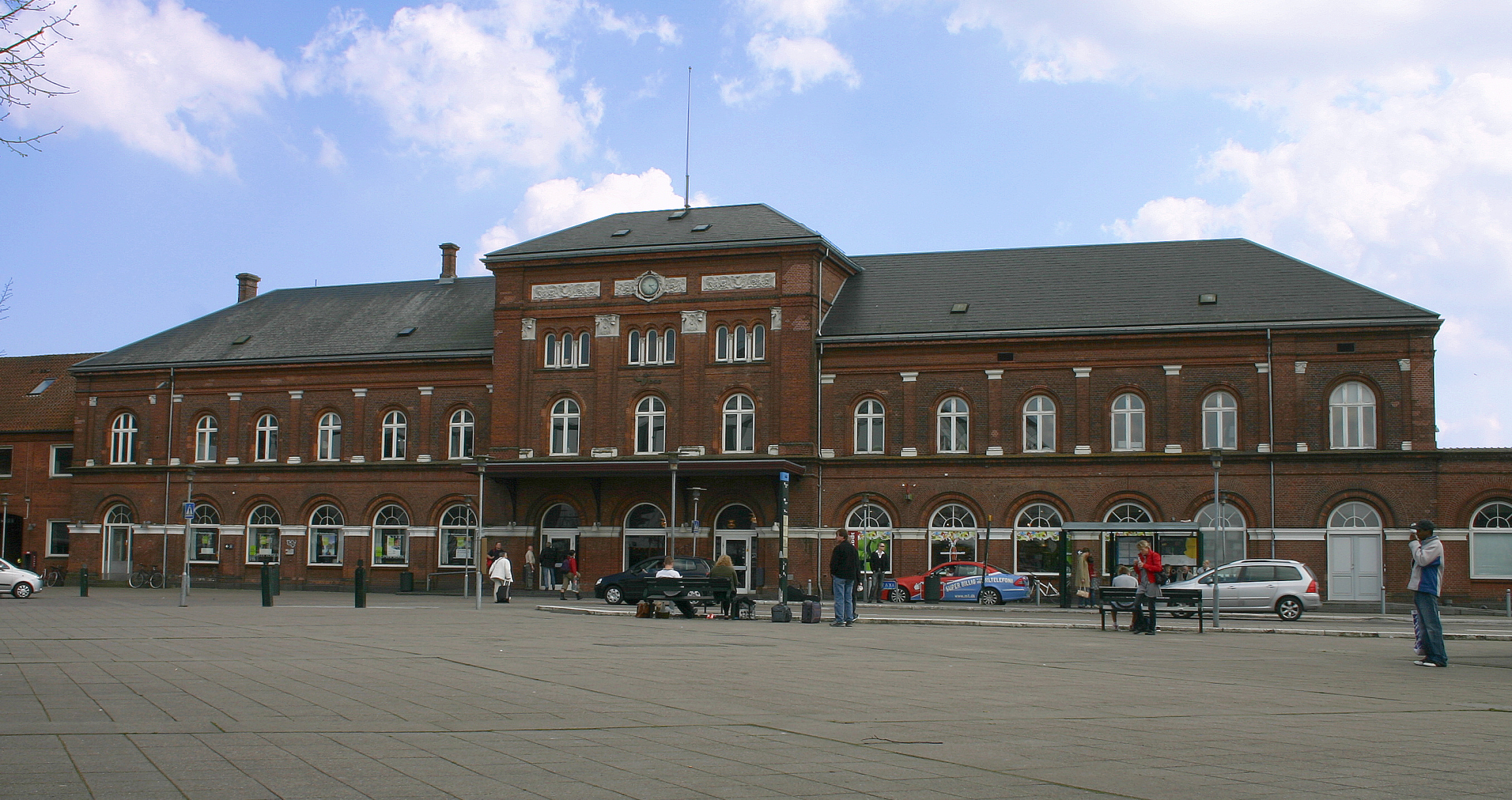
Kolding railway station (1866)

== Biography ==
Arboe was born at Rønne on the island of Bornholm, Denmark. He was the son of Otto Henrik Arboe and Oliva Elisabeth Saxtorph. He attended the Royal Danish Academy of Fine Arts building school and ornament school from 1855 to 1862 where he was a student of Gustav Friedrich Hetsch (1788–1864) and also trained under Niels Sigfred Nebelong (1806–1871).

He was an Officer in the Royal Danish Army from 1863 where he rose to the rank of captain and was discharged in 1868. From 1868 he was an architect at the railway company De jysk-fyenske Jernbaner (the Funen and Jutland Railways), and from 1880 in Aarhus at the state railway system DSB.

He designed a number of public buildings, especially railway stations in cities including Kolding (1866), Hjørring (1871), Guldager (1874), Tommerup (1883), Nyborg (1891) Hobro (1893), Viborg (1896) and Aalborg (1902). In addition, he designed the town hall in Nibe (1872), post office and telegraph buildings in Horsens (1880-81), as well as hospitals in Hobro (1880-81), Aarhus (1882) and Rønne (1890-92). In addition, he designed a number of other building including schools and prisons especially in Jutland.

== Personal life ==
In 1867, he married Charlotte Amalie Petersen (1832-1921). He died at Charlottenlund and was buried at Gentofte.

== See also ==
- List of Danish architects
