= Johan Hye-Knudsen =

Danish conductor

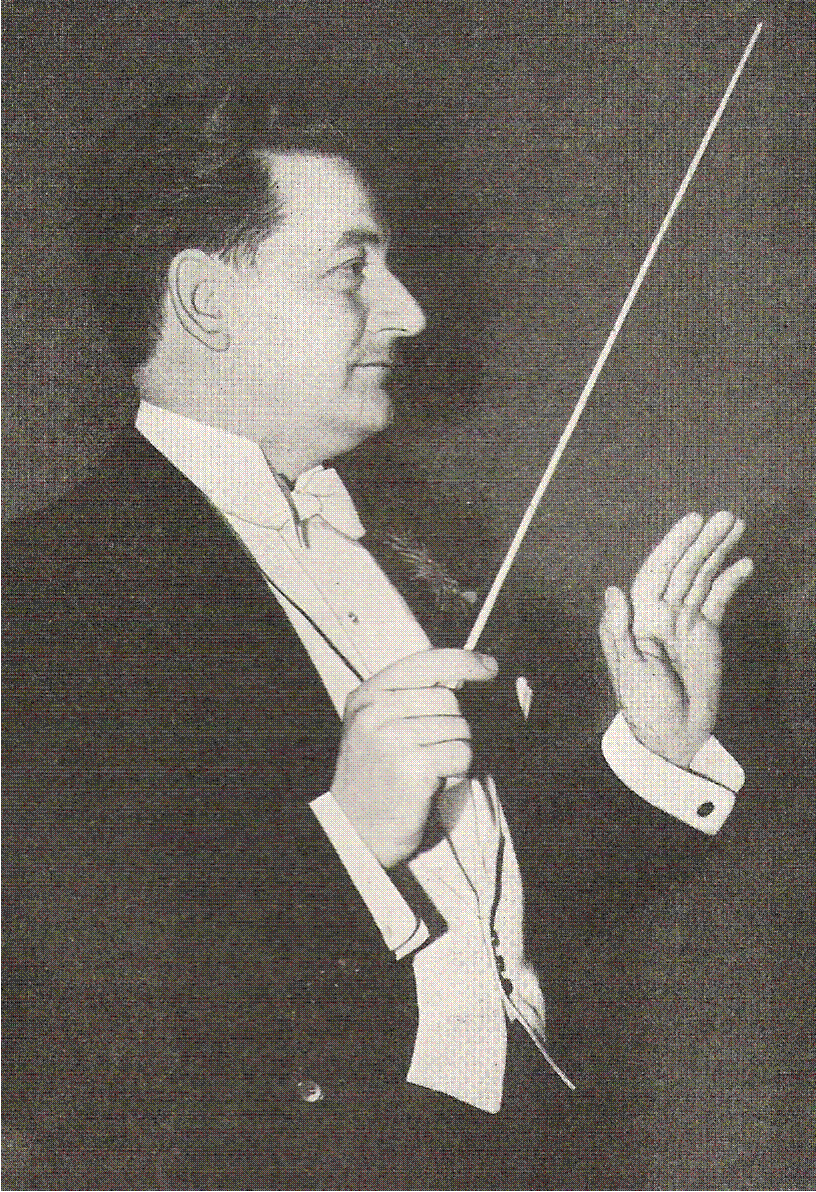
Johan Hye-Knudsen

Johan Hye-Knudsen (24 May 1896 in Nyborg – 28 September 1975) was a Danish conductor.
