= Morten Storm =

Danish spy (born 1976)

Morten Storm (born January 2, 1976, in Korsør), alias Murad Storm and Murad Storm Al-Denmarki, is a Danish, former convert to Islam and a former Islamic radical, who became disenchanted with Islamism after 10 years and went to work as an agent of the Danish Security and Intelligence Service (PET) operating in Islamic militant circles. His identity became public knowledge in 2012 when he came forward in the newspaper Jyllands-Posten.

== Background ==
Storm grew up with his mother and stepfather in Korsør, a working class coastal town. Early in life his alcoholic father left home, and his stepfather beat him. He made friends with Arabs in his apartment complex. In school, Storm was unruly and was eventually sent to a Tvind school, where he befriended a number of criminals. He committed his first robbery at age 13, and went to jail several times for violent behavior. After jail, Storm was expelled from schools multiple times and went to special schools. In his youth, his criminal activities earned him upwards of DKK 10,000 a week. He spent the money on alcohol and drugs. At age 21, he was a prospect member of the Bandidos in Korsør during the Great Nordic Biker War.

Storm was also a talented soccer player and boxed at a local boxing club.

== Involvement with Islamic militants ==
Storm became a member of the motorcycle gang the Bandidos at an early age. Storm later became interested in Islam after reading a biography of Muhammad, and later converted with a friend at 19. He nevertheless continued his partying lifestyle until his arrest on June 28, 1997. While in custody, he met a Danish Muslim convert named Sulaiman. After his release, Storm moved with Sulaiman to Sulaiman's residence in England to avoid angry former members of the Bandidos. During his time there, Storm began praying five times daily and grew a beard.

Storm visited the Regent's Park Mosque in London and was offered a scholarship to study Arabic and Islam at a religious, Salafi school in Yemen. Storm accepted and moved to the religious seminaries in Sanaa and Damaaj in Yemen. His faith moved in a militant direction, and he corresponded with some individuals who were later convicted of terrorism. Storm claimed to have become close with Al-Qaeda leader Anwar al-Awlaki.

After 9 months in Yemen, Storm returned to London in late 1998. He then moved to Brixton, where he met Zacarias Moussaoui (the "wannabe" 9/11 hijacker) and "Shoe-bomber" Richard Reid. He became friends with Omar Bakri Muhammad Fostok, leader of the al-Muhajiroun group. The Guardian reported that while in London, "Storm and his associates inhabited a world of overstayed visas, violent online videos, idolized preachers, frustration and alienation.". Storm and the Islamic radicals he lived with were amateurish but threatening and connected to a global network of contacts who shared ideology and purpose. In London Storm became friends with Anwar al-Awlaqi, an American-born Yemeni, who at one time was regarded second only to Osama bin Laden in the Al-Qaeda network.

Storm traveled to Yemen for the second time in 2006. At this time Storm started to doubt the message of radical militancy.

== PET agent ==
In the past, Storm had been contacted by MI5 and PET (Politiets Efterretningstjeneste, or Danish Security and Intelligence Service), but he had refused their offers of collaboration. However, in 2006, as he became increasingly dissatisfied with militant Islam, Storm contacted the European domestic intelligence agencies. The CIA later got involved as well, in the United States' War on Terror. According to Storm, he left Islam in 2006 and was recruited by PET as an agent, leading a double life until 2011. He further claimed to have initiated contact with PET. While working as an agent, he established front companies which ostensibly organized wilderness trips. These companies allowed him to leave for long periods of time and explain his source of income.

During the course of his undercover work, Storm was involved in a mission to track Anwar al-Awlaki in Yemen and pass on al-Awlaki’s whereabouts to the CIA. Storm claims that the plan involved bringing al-Awlaki a wife. According to Storm, a Croatian woman was selected and given a tracking device to carry in her suitcase, which would reveal al-Awlaki’s residence on her arrival there. Storm’s story is supported by a text message, supposedly sent by the lead officer at PET, reading “Congratulations brother, you’ve just become rich, very rich”. The story is additionally supported by a picture Storm took of the $250,000 reward offered for his intel.

Danish documentary filmmaker Nagieb Khaja had planned to film a documentary about an Islamist training camp in 2006 with Storm's help. The film was later abandoned. A second documentary fell through in 2009 when Storm left the project.

On September 30, 2011, having been located, al-Awlaki was killed by an American drone strike. The significance of Storm’s intel in finding al-Awlaki is disputed.

In August 2012, PET offered Storm DKK 25,000 per month tax-free for five years in return for his silence.

In October 2012, Storm came forward in a series of articles published by Jyllands-Posten. When his story became public, PET issued a press release stating that they neither confirmed nor denied Storm’s story. They wrote, in part:

Normalt udtaler vi os jo ikke om målene for vores operative arbejde. Det kommer dog næppe bag på nogen, at PET som andre vestlige efterretningstjenester har haft fokus på al-Awlaki, og at PET's operative indsats i forhold til al-Awlaki har været rettet mod at afdække konkrete terrortrusler mod Danmark eller danske interesser i udlandet, herunder eventuel kontakt mellem al-Awlaki og terrorrelaterede personer, grupper eller netværk i Danmark.
(English) Normally, we do not give statements regarding the goals of our operational work. However, it will come as no surprise that PET has, along with other Western intelligence agencies, been focusing on al-Awlaki, and that PET's operational actions in regards to al-Awlaki have been aimed at uncovering specific terror threads against Denmark or Danish interests abroad, including possible correspondence between al-Awlaki and terror-affiliated individuals, groups or networks within Denmark.

At a July 2014 political event on Bornholm, Storm participated in a debate arranged by the International Free Press Society.

== Personal life ==
Storm converted to Islam 1997, and married his first wife in 2000. Storm has three children from his first marriage; Osama, born in 2002, and Sarah, born in 2003. Storm and his first wife separated in 2005; he married his second wife in 2006. He left Islam after his work.

== Publications ==
In 2002, he published a Danish translation of the Islamic fundamentalist book The Islamic Creed: Questions and Answers by Muhammad bin Jamil Zeno.

In August 2014, Agent Storm: My Life Inside al-Qaeda by Morten Storm with CNN reporters Tim Lister and Paul Cruickshank was published by Atlantic Monthly Press.
