= Korsør =

- City
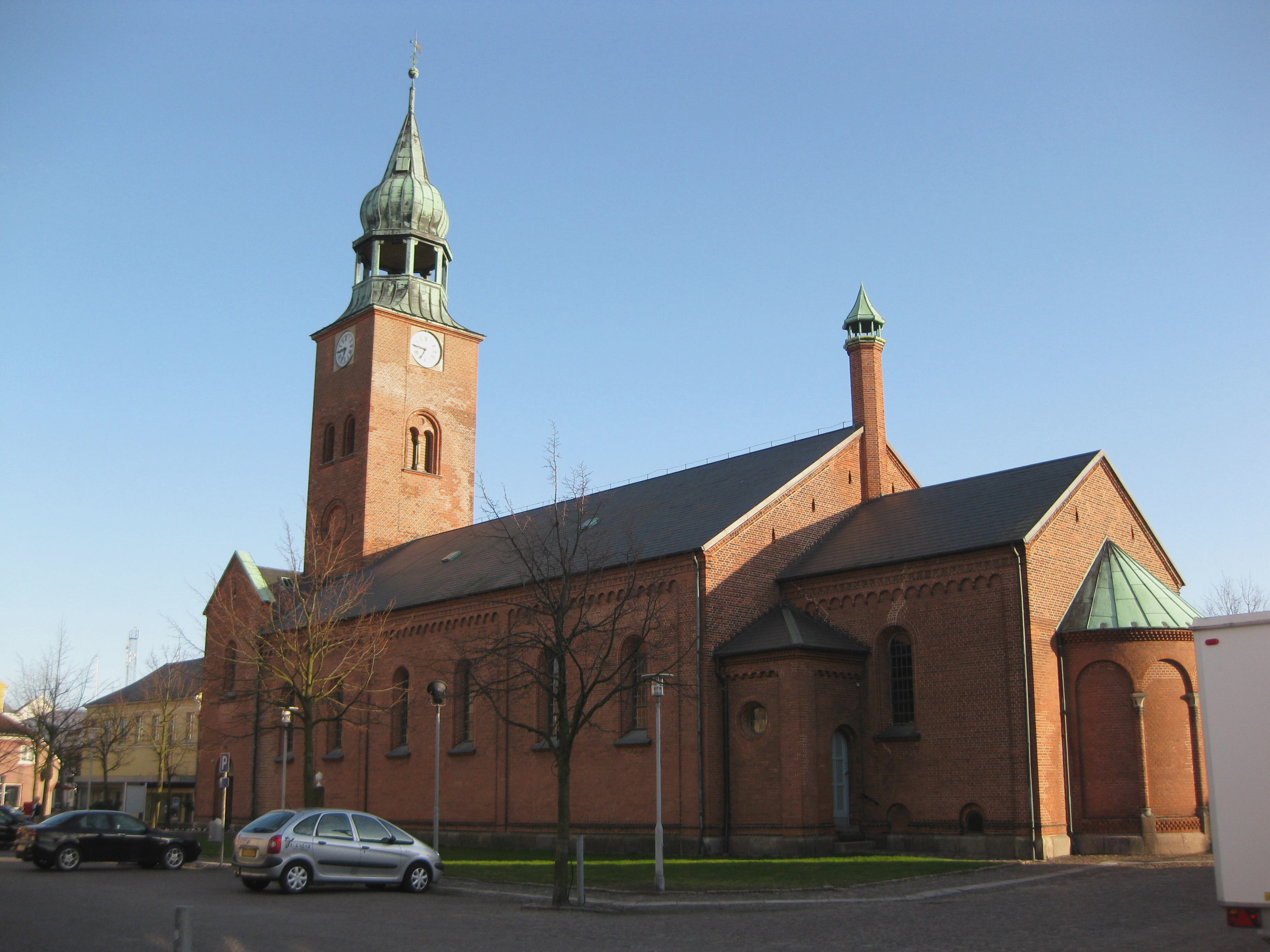
- Church of Saint Paul (Sankt Povls Kirke)

- Coat of arms

- Location in Denmark Korsør (Denmark Region Zealand)
- Coordinates: 55°20′1″N 11°08′23″E
- Country: Denmark
- Region: Region Zealand
- Municipality: Slagelse

Area
  - Urban: 6.7 km^{2} (2.6 sq mi)

Population (2026)
  - Urban: 14,290
  - Urban density: 2,100/km^{2} (5,500/sq mi)
  - Gender: 7,047 males and 7,243 females
- Demonym: Korsoraner Korsørianer
- Time zone: UTC+1 (CET)
  - Summer (DST): UTC+2 (CEST)
- Postal code: DK-4220 Korsør
- Calling code: (+45) 58

Korsør is a town in Zealand, Denmark. It is located in Slagelse Municipality. Until 2007 Korsør was the seat of Korsør Municipality. The town is located 15 km (9.3 mi) west of Slagelse, 12 km (7.5 mi) north-west of Skælskør and connects to Nyborg through the Great Belt Bridge.

Formerly the main ferry port from Zealand to Funen, the town of Korsør is divided into two halves by the Korsør Nor inlet, with the northern part named Halsskov. Most of the historical southern part of Korsør (Korsør proper) is low-lying and prone to flooding.

== Culture ==
The Korsør Biograf Teater, which opened in August 1908 (118 years ago), is the world's oldest movie theater in continuous use that is still operating.

== Sights ==
Korsør Mini Town (Danish: Korsør Miniby) is a miniature model of the town of Korsør as it looked in 1875. It is built in 1:10 scale and has existed since 2001.

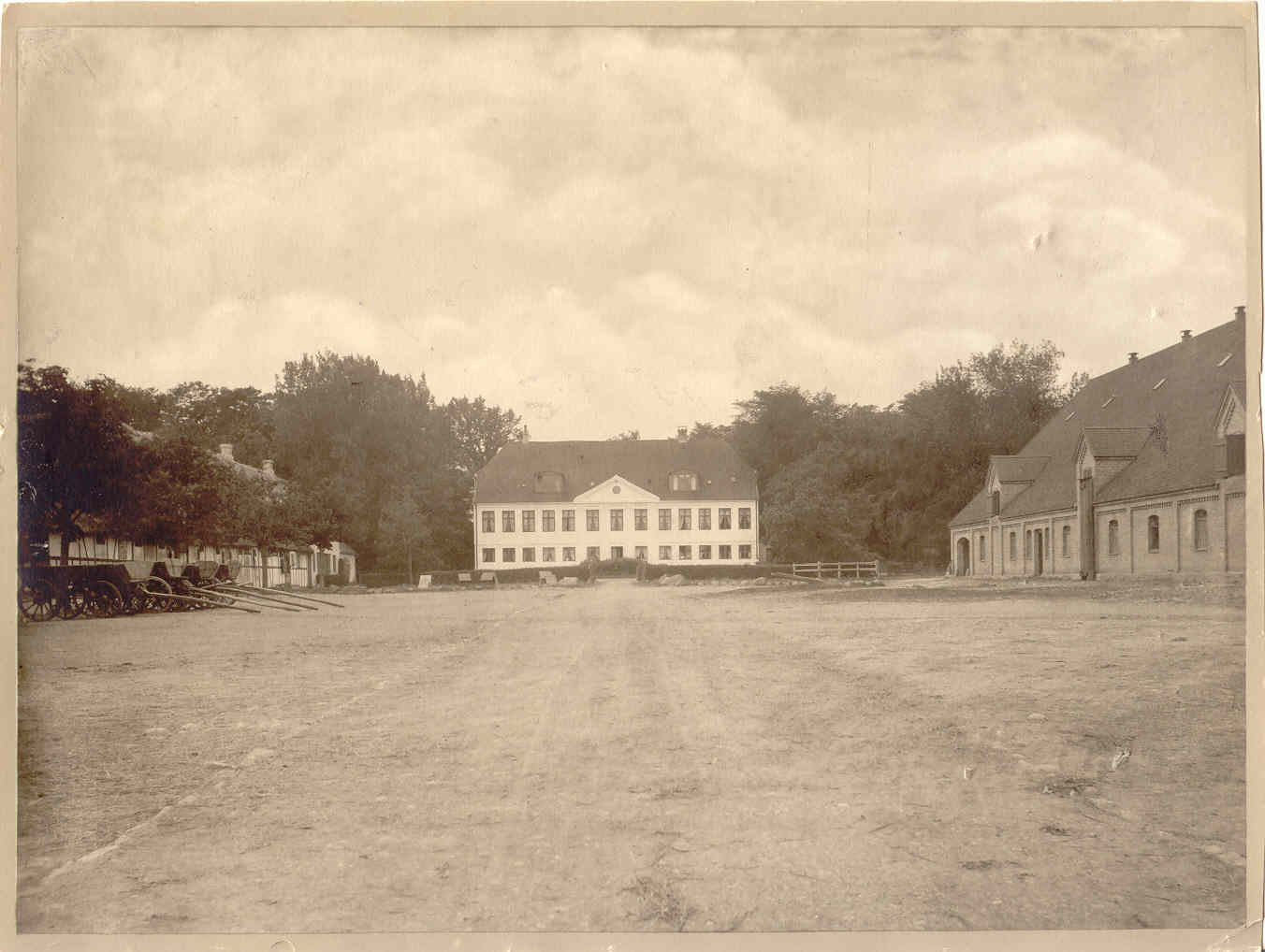
Tårnborg 1895

Tårnborg is a manor located in Halsskov in Korsør. Tårnborg was originally a village, in which a castle was built in the 1100s. It was referred to as Korsør Castle and later came under the name of Dyrehovedgaard. It was renamed to Tårnborg in 1846. The manor owns 334 acres.

=== Korsør Fortification ===
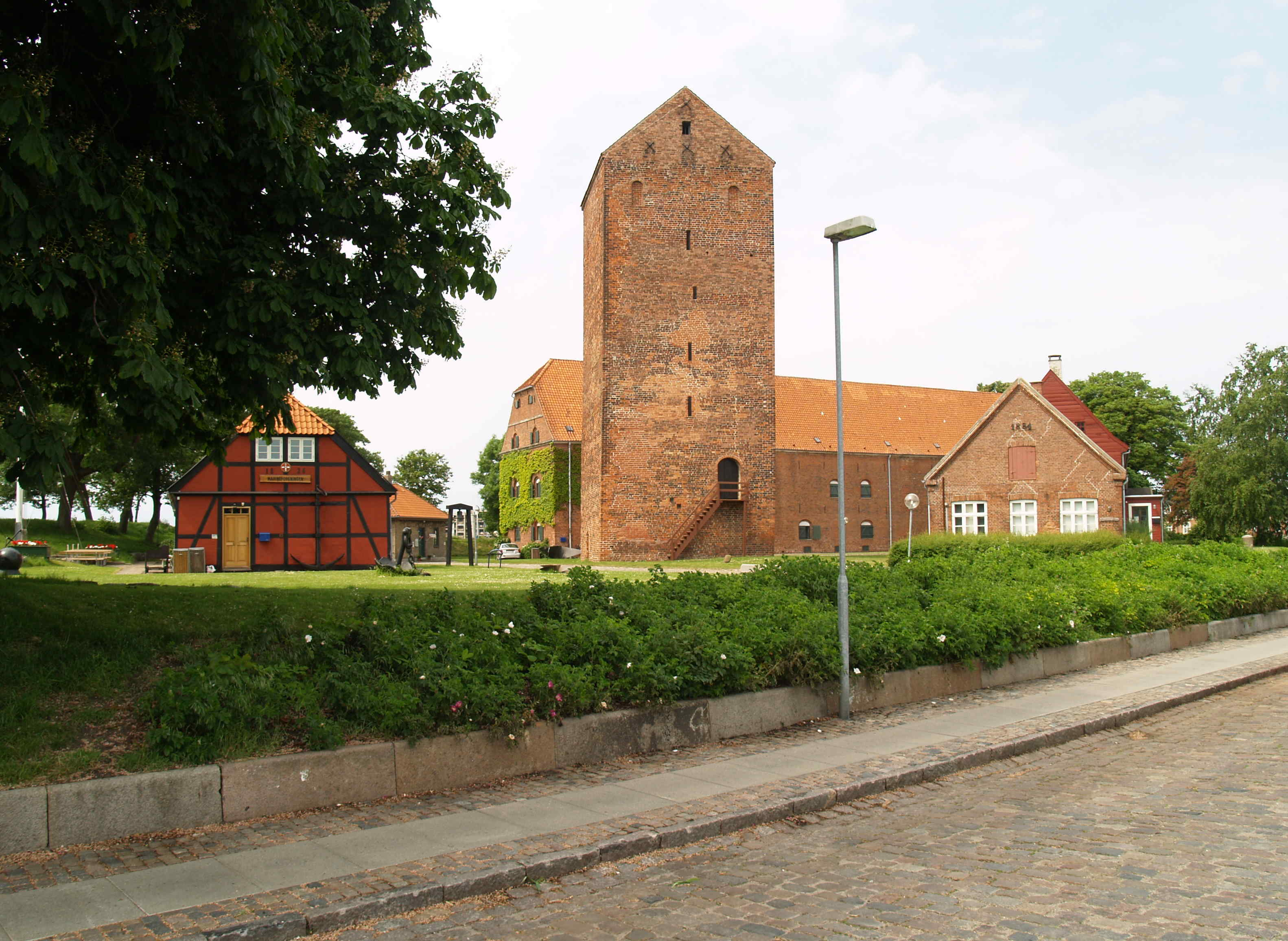
Korsør Fortification

Map of Korsør Fortification (c. 1700)

Korsør Fortification (Danish: Korsør Fæstning) is a set of fortifications located centrally in Korsør. It was built in the 1100s. Today there are five buildings on the fortifications, though all are built at different times and only the tower originates from the castle that was located on the fortification. The tower is from the 1200s.

Korsør City and Strait Crossing Museum (Danish: Korsør By og Overfartsmuseum) is a museum located in Korsør. The museum was founded in 1983, and is focussed on the strait crossing from Korsør to Nyborg. The museum is located in a building on Korsør Fortification.

== Notable residents ==
=== Public thought and politics ===
- Pia Adelsteen (born 1963), politician and member of parliament
- Hedevig Johanne Bagger (1740–1822), inn-keeper and postmaster
- Aage Friis (1870–1949), historian
- Hans A. Hansen (1877–1949), sailor for the United States Navy
- Hedda Lundh (1921–2012), resistance fighter during the German occupation of Denmark in World War II
- John Dyrby Paulsen (born 1963), politician and mayor of the municipality
- Morten Storm (born 1976), former PET agent
- Lis Tribler (born 1952), politician and former mayor

=== Art ===
- Jens Baggesen (1764–1826), poet
- Urban Gad (1879–1947), film director
- Aage Giødesen (1863–1939), painter
- Pia Juul (1962-2020), poet and translator

=== Sport ===
- Casper Henningsen (born 1985), former football player
- Jim Larsen (born 1985), former football player
- Brian Nielsen (born 1965), former boxer

== See also ==
- Murder of Emilie Meng
