= Nyborg =

- City
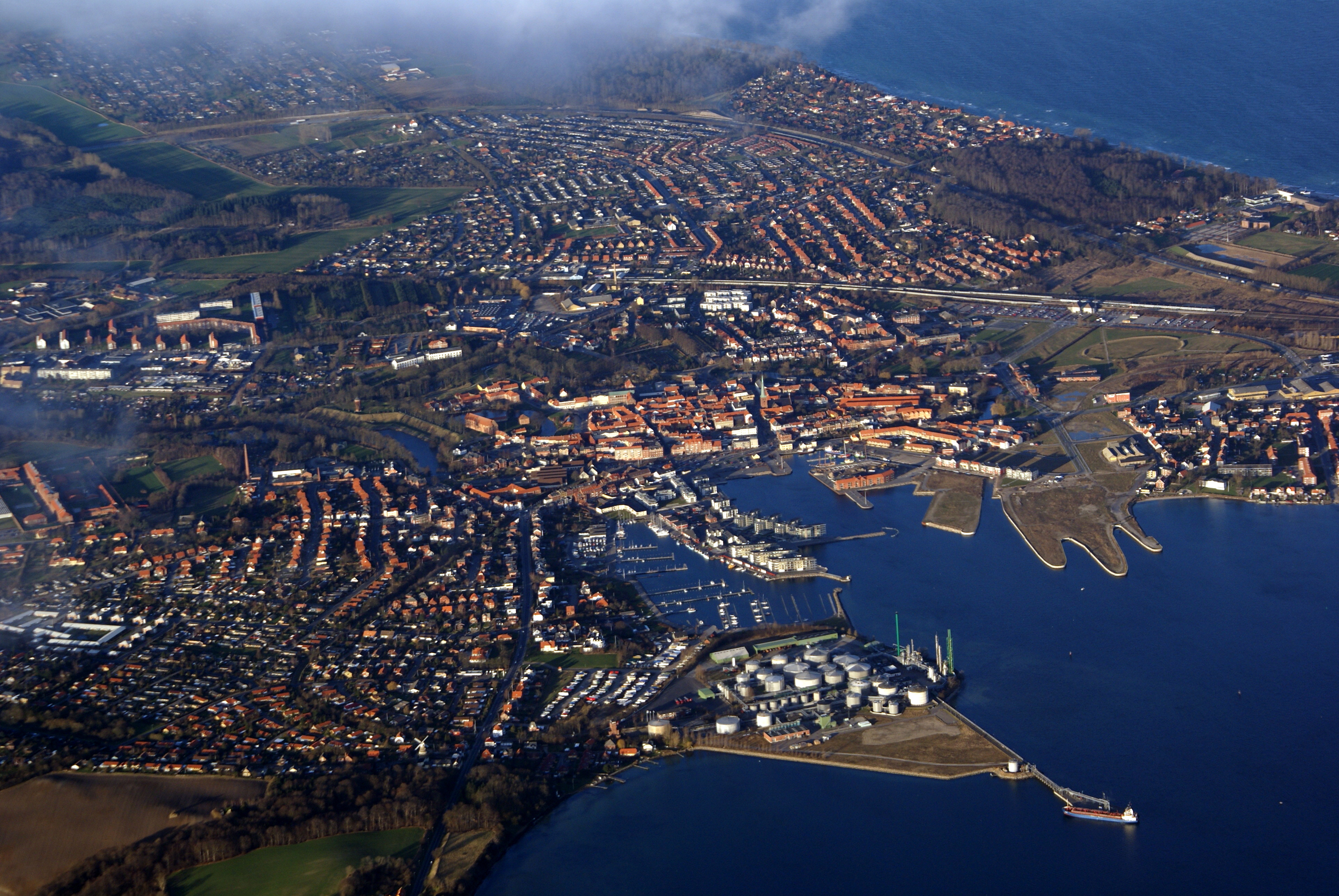
- Aerial view of Nyborg

- Coat of arms

- Location within Denmark Location within Region of Southern Denmark
- Coordinates: 55°18′44″N 10°47′23″E
- Country: Denmark
- Region: Southern Denmark
- Municipality: Nyborg
- Founded: Early 1200s

Area
  - Urban: 11.3 km^{2} (4.4 sq mi)

Population (2026)
  - Urban: 17,930
  - Urban density: 1,590/km^{2} (4,110/sq mi)
  - Gender: 8,569 males and 9,361 females
- Demonym: Nyborgenser
- Postal code: 5800
- Website: Nyborg.dk

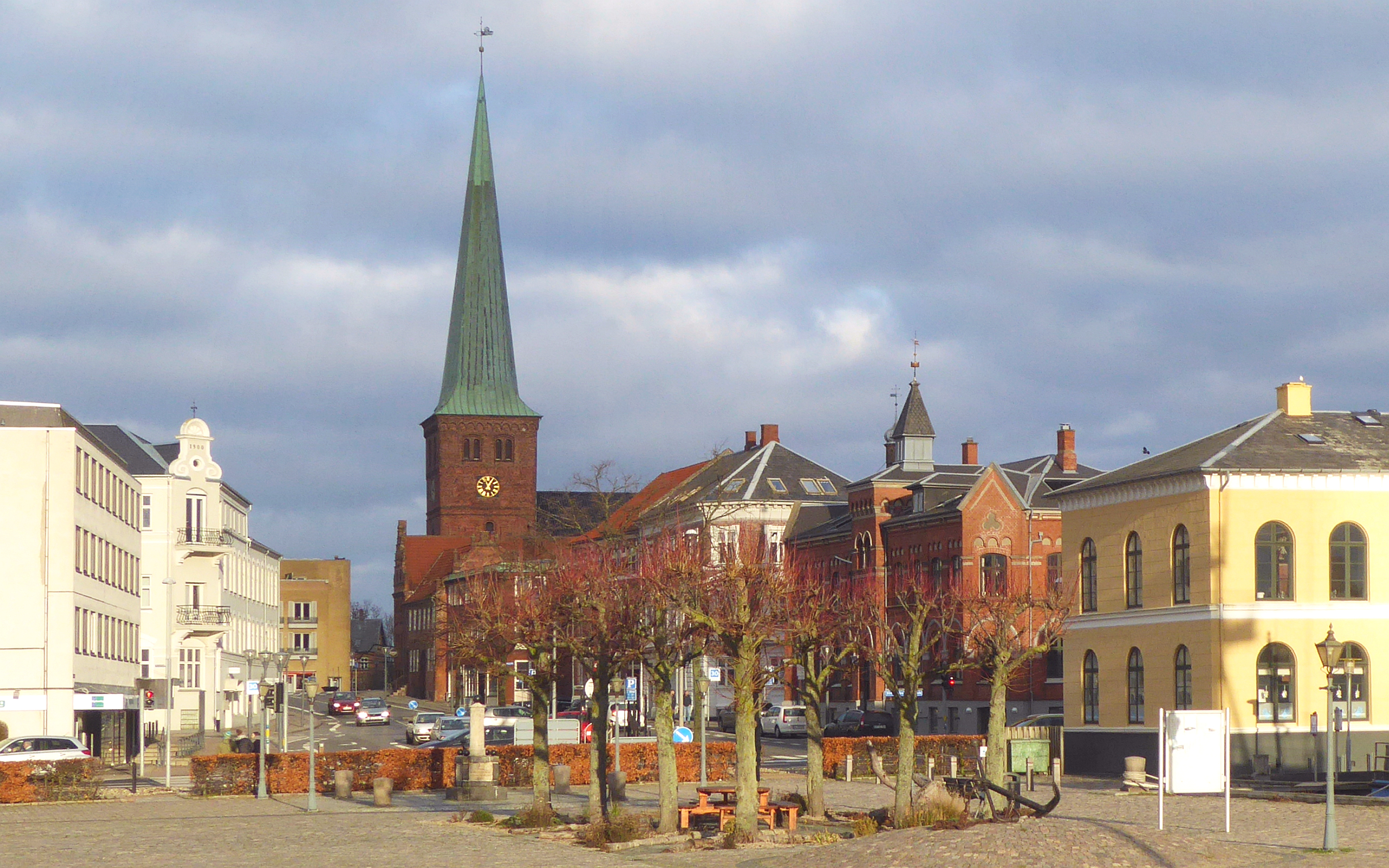
Nyborg centre: Adelgade with Church of Our Lady (photo 2018)

Nyborg is a city in southern Denmark, located in Nyborg Municipality on the island of Funen and with a population of 17,930 (2026). It is the easternmost settlement on Funen. By road, it is located 34 km east of Odense, 35 km north of Svendborg and 21 km south of Kerteminde. It also connects to Korsør through the Great Belt Bridge. Nyborg is the seat of Nyborg Municipality, and until 1793 it was also the seat of Nyborg County.

The city was founded in the 1200s, built up around Nyborg Castle. The castle holds a central place in Nyborg geographically, historically and culturally.

== Etymology ==
Nyborg was first mentioned in 1193 as 'Nyburg', which translates to 'new castle' in Danish.

== History ==
Before Nyborg was founded, a fortification existed in the area under the name of Gammelborg. It was established in the 500s, and used throughout the Viking age until Nyborg was founded and took over its role.

Nyborg was first mentioned in 1193 in the history of Denmark as Nyborg Castle, which still exists today, but the town itself was not mentioned before the year 1202. From its foundation and until 1413, Nyborg Castle was used by numerous kings as seat of the Danehof and other meetings, including a meeting between Queen Margaret I and the Counts of Holstein in 1386. The first Constitution of Denmark was written on Nyborg Castle by Eric V in 1282. Being the seat of these meetings, Nyborg enjoyed a number of unique and special privileges, granted by the king. The first was granted by king Valdemar II, who granted the town the status of a market town (Danish: Købstad) shortly after the town was founded. Merchants from neighboring hundreds had to come to Nyborg to sell their wares, boosting the economy and traffic in the town. In 1446, a large number of additional privileges were added, including the outlawing of harbours between the market towns on eastern Funen. Nyborg was also given permission to host a yearly market, and artisans from Vindinge Hundred were told to move to the market towns, boosting the population and economy of Nyborg once more. With the king visiting regularly, due to Nyborg's central location and the castle being the seat of the Danehof, Nyborg was given many additional privileges over the years.

In 1525 Frederick I declared Nyborg as the king's residency, and until the 1560s it acted as the capital of Denmark. During this time, Christian III expanded Nyborg Castle and city. Much of the castle was rebuilt and a tournament ground was built in front of the castle.

The city was captured by Swedish troops during the Dano-Swedish War, following the Battle of Nyborg. The Swedish troops sent all valuables home to Sweden and ruined much of Nyborg Castle. The city was retaken by an allied force of Danes, Brandenburgers, Polish mercenary cavalry and Dutchmen after a bombardment by a large Dutch naval fleet led by the famous Dutch Admiral Michiel DeRuyter, who was key in the negotiations and Swedes capitulation. The city was then looted by the allied forces with DeRuyter giving strict orders prohibiting Dutch forces (who made up a third of the allied army) not to participate. DuRuyter noted in his log that the Poles were allowed to take the captured Danish wives and daughters of Nyborg as part of the plundered booty, to his utter disgust – but there was nothing he could do to prevent it. Following the war, the king was no longer interested in living in the castle, and it was handed over to the military. Nyborg became an army garrison, with the castle then being used strictly for military purposes.

After the wars and several fires and livestock plagues, the 1700s were a low period in Nyborg's history, with the population growing poorer. Things turned around in the 1800s where Nyborg became and important link across the Great Belt, with steamboat ferries starting to sail between Nyborg and Korsør in 1828. Several large markets were also held yearly, and the trade and economy of the town began to grow again.

In the Second World War, Nyborg's garrison still existed. Denmark was allowed to keep their military after the Nazi occupation. Nyborg Vandrehjem and Hotel Nyborg Strand housed Danish soldiers. On 29 August 1943 Operation Safari was carried out, with the intention of disarming the Danish military. Battles occurred between the Danish and German soldiers on both Nyborg Vandrehjem and Hotel Nyborg Strand. Two Danish soldiers were killed at Hotel Nyborg Strand: Cornet K.B. Madsen and Captain C.L. Wesenberg. The captain was killed by a German soldier, who also killed himself at the same time by accidentally blowing up them both with a grenade. That German soldier was most likely the only German casualty of the battle. There was a single Danish casualty during the battle at Nyborg Vandrehjem: Recruit Ivan Jacobsen.

In 1977 market towns were dissolved, and Nyborg lost its title. Nyborg Municipality was established, with Nyborg being the seat of the new municipality. It was formed of the city and parish of Nyborg, as well as the two parish municipalities of Avnslev-Bovense and Vindinge. In the 2007 municipal reform, the three municipalities of Nyborg, Ørbæk and Ullerslev were merged to form the present Nyborg Municipality.

=== Historical populations ===
Historical population

Year	Pop.	±%
1672	1,160	—
1769	1,637	+41.1%
1787	1,672	+2.1%
1801	1,866	+11.6%
1834	2,873	+54.0%
1840	2,891	+0.6%
1845	3,220	+11.4%
1855	3,565	+10.7%
1860	3,802	+6.6%
1870	4,812	+26.6%
1880	5,402	+12.3%
1890	6,049	+12.0%
1901	7,790	+28.8%
1911	9,056	+16.3%

Year	Pop.	±%
1921	10,223	+12.9%
1930	10,446	+2.2%
1940	9,949	−4.8%
1950	12,135	+22.0%
1960	13,377	+10.2%
1970	14,270	+6.7%
1981	15,466	+8.4%
1990	15,240	−1.5%
2000	15,792	+3.6%
2010	16,539	+4.7%
2015	16,752	+1.3%
2019	17,175	+2.5%
2020	17,268	+0.5%
2021	17,415	+0.9%

Source: Bolius.dk, Byhistorie.dk

=== Mayors ===
From 1850–1919 the mayors of Nyborg were chosen by the king. Since 1919 the mayor has been elected. Below are all Nyborg's mayors since 1850.

#	Mayor	Party	Term
As a market town
1	Frederik Ludvig Bierfreund		1850–1854
2	Jørgen Christian Møller		1854–1859
3	Erik Sophus Becker		1859–1880
4	S. Christian E. Hall		1880–1893
5	Christian Laur. Schou		1893–1899
6	P.N.V. Buch		1899–1913
7	Jørgen Nielsen		1913–1919
8	Ludvig Hansen	Social Democrats	1919–1935
9	J.J. Bjerring	Social Democrats	1935–1940
10	Christian S. Andersen	Social Democrats	1940–1946
11	C.E. Bjerring	Social Democrats	1946–1961
12	Carl Pelck	Social Democrats	1962–1965
13	Børge Jensen	Social Democrats	1965–1970
In the first Nyborg Municipality
13	Børge Jensen	Social Democrats	1970–1978
14	Frederik Nørgaard	Social Democrats	1978–1981
15	Aage Koch	Social Democrats	1981–1989
16	Niels Verner Andersen	Social Democrats	1990–2001
17	Jørn Terndrup	Venstre	2002–2006
In the current Nyborg Municipality
17	Jørn Terndrup	Venstre	2007–2009
18	Erik Skov Christensen	Social Democrats	2010–2013
19	Kenneth Muhs	Venstre	2014–present

== Nyborg Castle ==
Nyborg Castle is located near the center of Nyborg city, and is surrounded by fortifications, the 'castle lake' and a moat that run along the center of the city. The castle if first mentioned in 1193, when Canute VI held a meeting in it. Before then, the king were housed in Hjulby, outside Nyborg, and the castle was established in that period. A curtain wall was built, and there has likely been several wooden buildings within the walls. In the first half of the 1200s, a building was constructed in two floors, much of which still remain today. The king likely held his meetings in the upper floor of this construction. During the 1300s and 1400s, the castle was improve upon, with a new floor and several new buildings. In 1282, Eric V completed the constitution of Denmark in Nyborg Castle. In 1287, Eric V's alleged murderers were sentenced on the castle. In the 1520s, Frederick I planned to make Nyborg his official residence, but that never happened. Signs of his plans were obvious, however, with major projects on the castle planned.

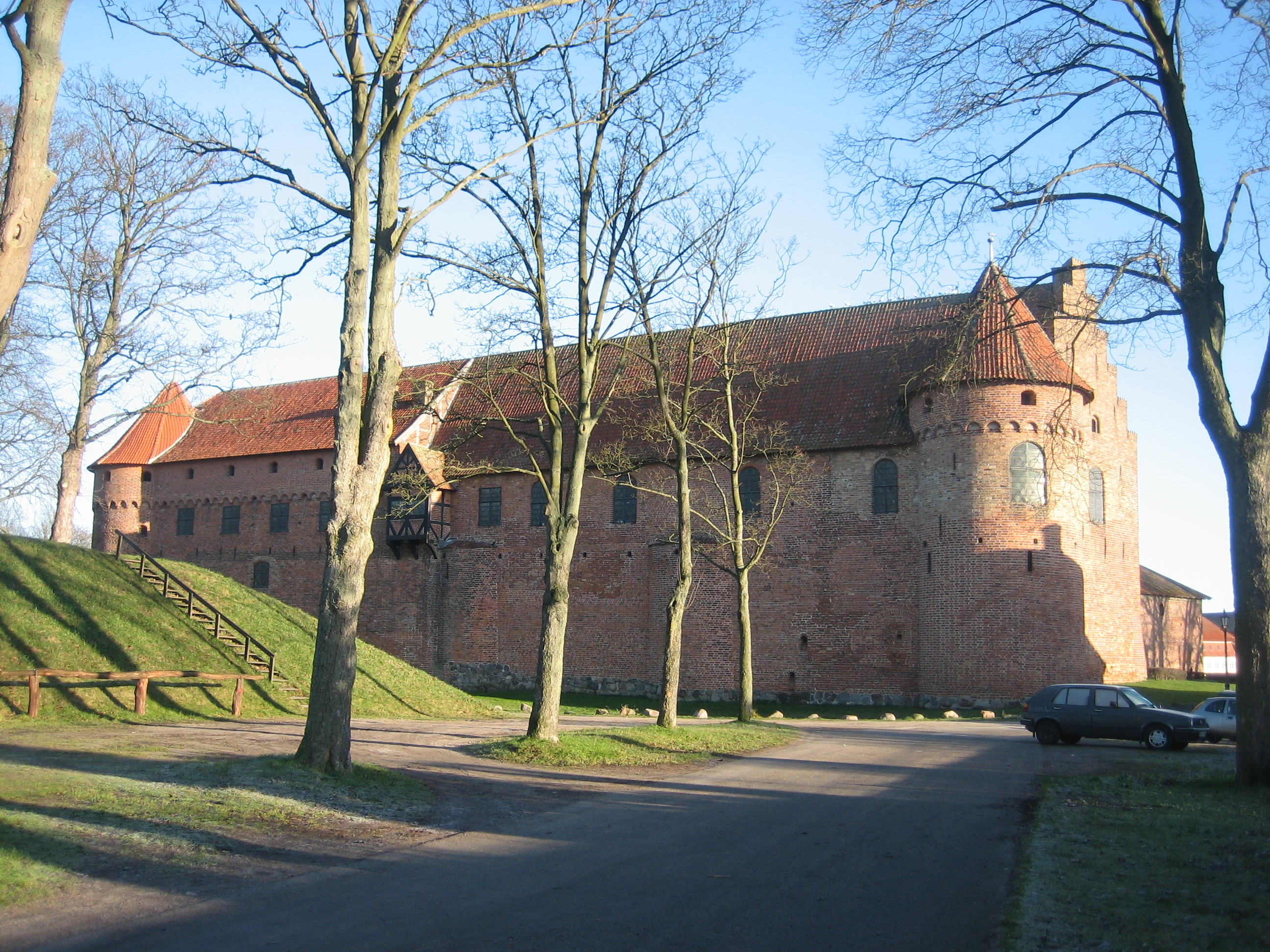
Nyborg Castle.

After the Dano-Swedish War, where the castle was captured and later turned into an armory, the importance of the castle fell. The garrison was disestablished in 1913. The castle was turned into a museum, which it has been since then. In 2017, a large project to renovate and expand the museum was begun, with plans to finish in 2023.

The fortifications, ramparts and moats surrounding Nyborg Castle stretch out along the center of the city. The moats appear as they did in the Middle Ages, with the same water regulation systems still in use. Three of the original bulwarks still exist, with the remaining having been torn down during city expansions. Two of those bulwarks are located around Nyborg Castle, and are known as the Queen's Bulwark (Danish: Dronningens Bastion) and the Crown Prince's Bulwark (Danish: Kronprinsens Bastion). Those are surrounded by the original ramparts, which today act as park areas. On the Queen's Bulwark is a water tower from 1899, built by Emil Swanenflügel. The water tower was protected in 1997. The third bulwark is called Prince Carl's Bulwark (Danish: Prins Carls Bastion), and is slightly smaller. It also acts as a park area.

== Nyborg Church ==
Nyborg Church (also known as Church of Our Lady. Danish: Vor Frue Kirke) is located in the center of Nyborg, and was built in 1375–1428. It was renovated in the 1970s and again in 2005.

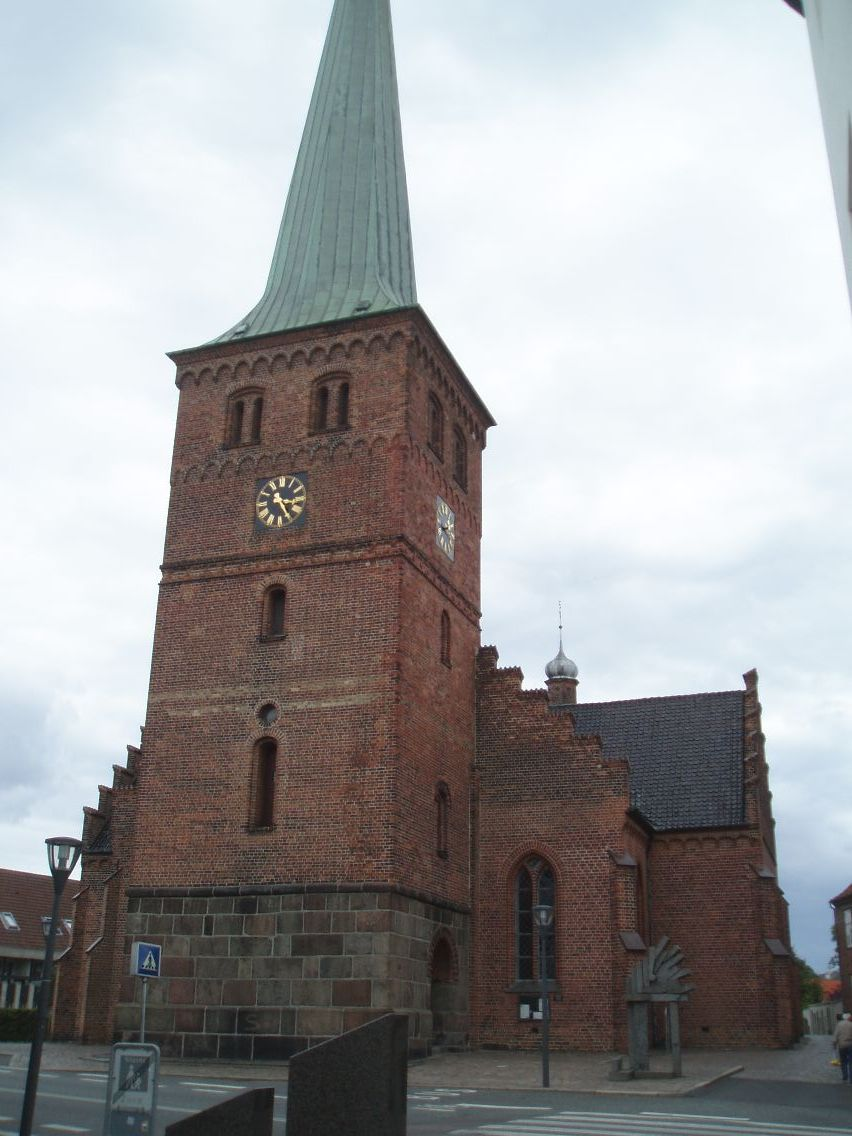
Church of Our Lady in Nyborg.

The church has two organs, from 1973 by Poul-Gerhard Andersen and 1830 by P.U.F. Demant. The crucifix is the only piece of inventory from the church's opening in 1428. It is decorated with biblical depictions. Maja Lisa Engelhardt created the altar crucifix, of gilded bronze, in 2011. Maja Lisa Engelhardt also created a mosaic for the church in 2015. The largest of the church's chandeliers was donated in 1640 by the mayor's widow, Sidsel Knudsdatter. The other chandelier was donated by mayor Mads Lerke in 1589. The renaissance baptismal font was donated to the church in 1585 by mayor Peder Jensen Skriver. The other baptismal font is Romanesque style in granite, from 1100. Inside the church is a gate from 1649, built by Christian IV's smith, Caspar Fincke. The pulpit is from 1653, made by Anders Mortensen in Odense. The pulpit's staircase is even older. The church has a set of wooden figures of John the Apostle and Jeremiah. Like the pulpit, they were also carved by Anders Mortensen. A candle globe, made by local artisan Flemming Knudsen, was added to the church in 2008.

The church's turret clock, nicknamed "the Syrian tank" (Danish: Den syriske kampvogn) was replaced by an electric movement in 1972. The original mechanical movement was built by Henrik Kyhl from Copenhagen, and initially created for Viborg Cathedral, who couldn't afford it. It was instead bought by Nyborg Church. In 2002 it was donated to Post- og Telemuseet in Copenhagen.

== Transportation ==
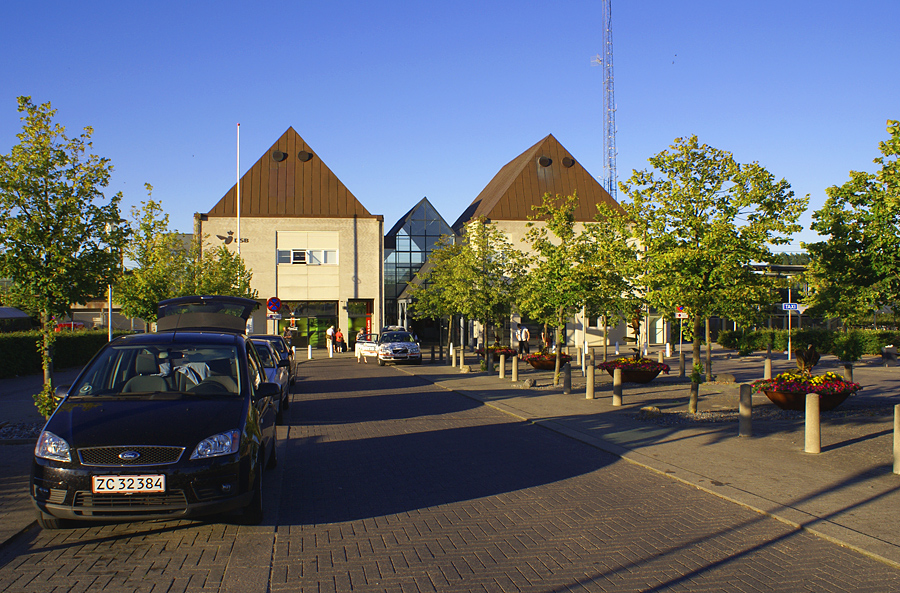
Nyborg railway station.

Nyborg is served by Nyborg railway station which is served by the passenger rail services between Copenhagen and Jutland. It is located on the Copenhagen–Fredericia/Taulov Line which connects the Danish capital, Copenhagen, and the Jutland peninsula by way of the islands of Zealand and Funen.

== Notable residents ==
=== Nobility ===
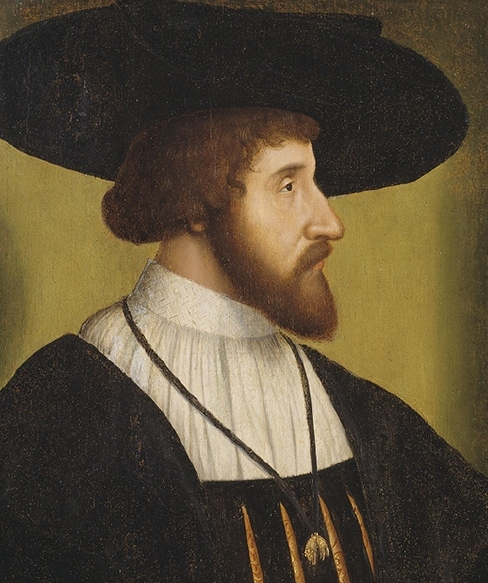
Christian II of Denmark

- Christian II of Denmark (1481–1559), king of Denmark, Norway and Sweden.
- Elizabeth of Denmark (1502–1535), electress of Brandenburg
- Christina of Denmark (1521–1590), princess and regent of Lorraine
- Rigborg Brockenhuus (1579–1641), noblewoman
- Karl Johann von Königsmarck (1659–1686), Swedish count

=== Public thought and politics ===
- Johan Theodor Holmskjold (1731–1793), botanist
- Ole Berendt Suhr (1813–1875), investor
- Thora Fiedler (1854–1941), nurse, prosthetist, inventor and nursing home principal
- Johannes Mollerup (1872–1937), mathematician
- Johannes Theodor Suhr (1896–1997), bishop
- Bodil Begtrup (1903–1987), women's rights activist
- Paul Neergaard (1907–1987), agronomist and agriculturist
- Jørn Terndrup (born 1947), politician
- Jens Lauritzen (born 1953), politician
- Erik Skov Christensen (born 1958), politician
- Henrik Lund-Nielsen (born 1965), entrepreneur

=== Art ===
- Carl Aarsleff (1852–1918), sculptor
- Sextus Miskow (1857–1928), singer
- Frederik Jensen (1863–1934), actor
- Johan Hye-Knudsen (1896–1975), musician
- Helge Kjærulff-Schmidt (1906–1982), actor
- Holger Juul Hansen (1924–2013), actor
- Erik Balling (1924–2005), film director
- Elsebeth Egholm (born 1960), author
- Signe Svendsen (born 1974), singer and participant of the Eurovision Song Contest 2001
- Søren Huss (born 1975), singer

=== Sport ===
- Hans Jørgensen (1889–1955), rower
- Ragnhild Hveger (1920–2011), swimmer
- Leif Printzlau (born 1948), football player
- Søren Skov (born 1954), football player
- Lars Lunde (born 1964), former football player
- Dorte Jensen (born 1972), sailor
- Kathrine Heindahl (born 1992), handball player
- Søren Toft Hansen (born 1992), badminton player
- Frederik Søgaard (born 1997), badminton player
