= Narsaq massacre =

1990 mass shooting in Greenland

- Location: 60°54′44″N 46°2′55″W; Narsaq, Kujalleq, Greenland
- Date: 1 January 1990
- Attack type: Mass shooting, mass murder
- Weapon: Remington Model 552
- Deaths: 7
- Injuries: 1
- Perpetrator: Abel Mikaelsen Klemmensen

The Narsaq massacre was a mass shooting on 1 January 1990 in Narsaq, a southern Greenland town in the municipality of Kujalleq, 250 miles (400 km) south of the island's capital of Nuuk. Seven people were killed and one critically wounded during a party in the worst mass shooting in Greenland's history.

== Background ==
The self-governing Greenland has a relatively high murder rate compared to Denmark. A large proportion of Greenland's population are hunters and laws restricting ownership and storage of firearms are very light compared to Denmark's.

In the 20th century perpetrators of even relatively serious crimes often were allowed to serve their sentence in the open or semi-open prisons and institutions in Greenland. Those considered a significant risk to society were transferred to a closed prison in Denmark. More recently, a closed prison was built in Greenland's capital. Narsaq, with around 1,300 people of mostly Inuit ethnicity, is one of the largest towns in Greenland. The town contains one small hospital and a police station. Greenland had 18 homicides in 1989.

== Shooting ==
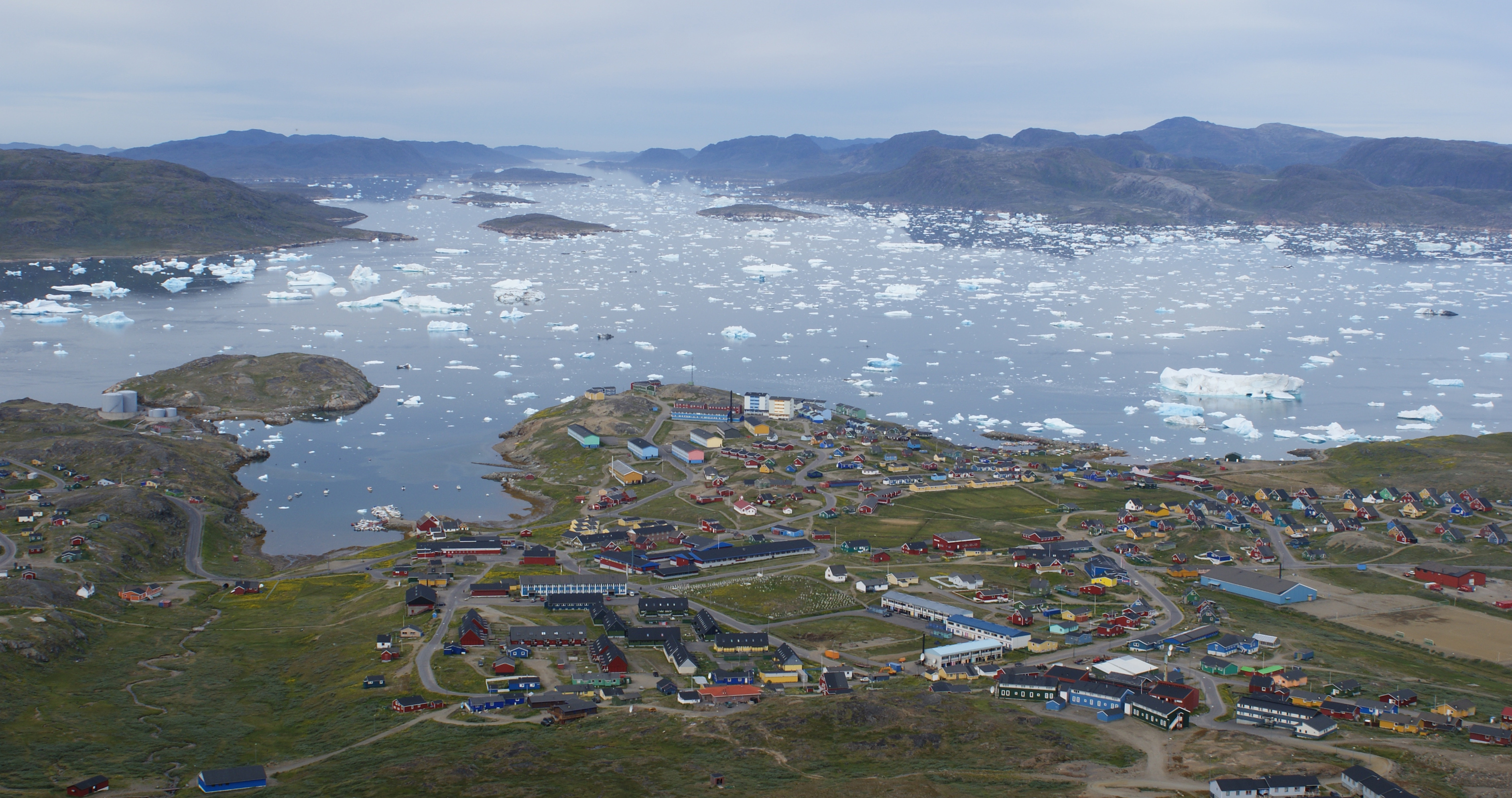
Narsaq

During a New Years party after the turn of the year 1989 to 1990, student Abel Klemmensen got involved in a dispute with his best friend for taking the side of a girl he was angry at. Feeling betrayed, he then went home and later returned to the party with a semiautomatic rifle from his parents' house with the intention to kill all attendants of the party and commit suicide afterwards.

Klemmensen then opened fire in a boarding house complex in Ungbo, being used as a club. In two rooms on the first floor he shot three women and four men, including his own brother, who was wounded by a shot through the cheek. Three men and two women died at the scene, while two more women died in the local hospital. All those killed were shot in the head. While walking downstairs to the living room he shot a fourth woman. He had fired eleven rounds and hit all of his victims in the head. He was drunk at the time of the crime. After the shooting, Klemmensen then went home to sleep, where he was later arrested by police and placed in custody.

== Aftermath ==
The man in custody was identified as an 18-year-old student who confessed to the killings, said police inspector Lars Heilman. The suspect's name was later released as Abel Mikaelsen Klemmensen (b. 1971). The crime scene was described as "gruesome" by the police. A team of police forensic scientists traveled to Narsaq from Copenhagen to investigate the killings, but were delayed by heavy snowfall. Those killed, all Inuit (like the perpetrator), were identified only as three men, aged 18, 33 and 34, and four women, aged 18, 19, 26 and 29. The wounded man was only identified as a "22-year-old man in stable condition with head wounds".

Klemmensen was later diagnosed as suffering from narcissistic personality disorder and was sentenced to indefinite detention at a psychiatric institution in March 1991. Considered too dangerous for the open and semi-open prisons in Greenland, he was moved to Herstedvester, a prison with facilities for psychiatric treatment in Denmark. Following an assessment, Klemmensen was allowed to serve at a semi-open facility in 2008. He first requested parole in 2011, but it was denied. In 2015, the High Court of Greenland granted him a five-year parole and he was released.
