= Peter Lundin =

Danish serial killer

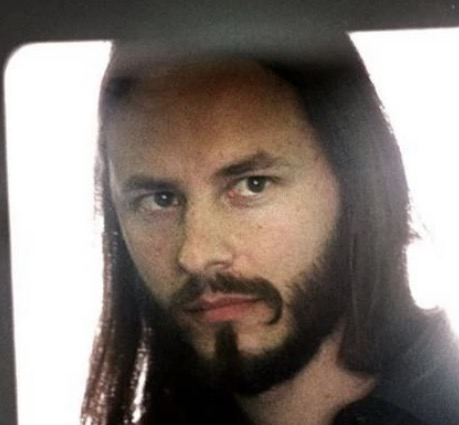
- Born: Peter Kenneth Bostrøm Lundin; February 15, 1972 (age 54); Roskilde, Denmark
- Other names: Niels Schaftner; Bjarne Skounborg; Thomas Kristian Olesen
- Conviction: Murder
- Penalty: Life imprisonment

Details
- Victims: 4
- Span of crimes: 1991–2000
- Country: United States, Denmark
- States: North Carolina, Copenhagen
- Date apprehended: July 5, 2000
- Imprisoned at: Institution of Herstedvester

Peter Kenneth Bostrøm Lundin (born February 15, 1972), who later renamed himself to Bjarne Skounborg and most recently to Thomas Kristian Olesen, is a Danish serial killer who, on March 15, 2001, was sentenced to life imprisonment by the Østre Landsret for a triple murder. The night between June 16 and 17, 2000, he killed and then dismembered his cohabitant Marianne Pedersen and her two sons, Dennis (10) and Brian (12), in their house at Nørregårdsvej 26 in Rødovre.

On March 15, 2001, Lundin was found guilty of having caused Marianne Pedersen and her two sons' deaths, but claimed that it was an accident. His lawyer Bjørn Lund Hansen also argued in court that it was an accident, and when Lundin was found guilty, he asked for his sentence to be limited to 16 years in prison. State Attorney Erik Merlung, who represented the case as a prosecutor, had always thought that Lundin should be sentenced for murder, and he demanded life imprisonment. Despite the Retslægerådet's recommendation—‌and eventual success—‌in granting the prosecutor's request for life imprisonment, the country's highest judicial and medical experts had recommended the prisoner remain in custody.

The case is one of Denmark's most horrifying and most talked about murders in recent times. Lundin is currently serving his life sentence at the Institution of Herstedvester.

== Early life and upbringing ==
Peter Lundin was born on February 15, 1972, at Roskilde Sygehus, as the son of Ole Bostrøm Lundin (1935–2014) and the German-born Anna Lundin (née Schaftner; 1932–1991). In 1950, Ole Lundin and his brother had moved from Canada to the United States, with the purpose of joining the United States Army, where they could keep their Danish citizenship, unlike in the Canadian army. The brother was sent to Korea, where he died from a virus, while Ole was stationed in West Germany. While serving in West Germany, Ole met the young German girl Anna Schaftner. They married and later settled in Denmark.

Ole was employed as a bricklayer and built the couple's house on Fuglesangsvej in Solrød Strand. In 1979, the master builder Lundin developed a blood clot that incapacitated him, and coupled with the family's financial struggles, their house was foreclosed. Following this, they decided to emigrate to the United States with their 9-year-old son Peter. They bought a house on Essex Drive in the town of Ormond Beach, Florida, where they ran a motel.

In 1984, the family moved into a newly acquired house in Maggie Valley, North Carolina. A few years later, Ole decided to leave his wife Anna, taking his son with him. Together, they initially settled in Los Angeles, where they stayed for a few weeks. They then moved on to New York City and, later, Boston. Their journey ended in Miami, where Ole found an apartment and work as a bricklayer again. However, Ole and Anna got together again, with the father and son bringing Anna down to Florida from North Carolina. In the meantime, the 14-year-old Peter had started studying at a school in Miami.

During his school time in Miami, Peter worked various jobs in his spare time, including as a waiter at a restaurant. On the day he turned 16, he left school and instead began work as a bricklayer with his father. It was during this period that he first became acquainted with drugs such as cocaine and marijuana. However, the family moved back to Maggie Valley again, where he started studying at the local high school. At this time, Peter started selling cannabis to his classmates.

== First conviction ==
=== Murder of his mother ===
The murder of Anna Schaftner Lundin took place around April 1, 1991 (the exact date has never been established with certainty). Peter Lundin was 19 years old, and there had been chaos in the family for a long time. As both of them were often drunk, Peter and Ole were violent towards Anna. The situation had previously been so serious that the family's neighbors had called the police several times, but no report came out of the police visits.

It is suspected that a quarrel caused the murder. Anna Lundin wanted to cut off her son Peter's long hair, causing him to choke her. Together with his father, they drove the body to the city of Buxton and buried her on the wide sandy beach of Cape Hatteras.

On November 1, 1991, some passers-by who were on a walk on the beach near the lighthouse at the Outer Banks in Buxton discovered the body of a woman which had been washed ashore. The body was wrapped in a blue blanket, covered with black plastic and wrapped with tape and a yellow rope. Peter and his father had since fled to Canada, but on June 6, 1992, they were both arrested in a Toronto hotel room.

In July 1993, Peter Lundin was sentenced to 20 years imprisonment in Dare County. At the same time, his father Ole was sentenced to 2 years as an accomplice. Both were ordered to be deported to Denmark upon completion of their sentences. Ole finished his sentence and was deported while Peter appealed both the length of his sentence and his deportation. He failed to overturn his conviction, but on February 16, 1995, his sentence was reduced to 15 years, which he served at Brown Creek Correctional Institution.

=== The American Dream ===
In 1994, Lundin was interviewed by Danish TV channel TV 2 during his stay in prison. The broadcast by Nordisk Film TV for TV 2 was organized by the television journalist Jesper Klit. The broadcast was called The American Dream and discussed young Danes across the Atlantic. It was by chance that Lundin took part in the program. While randomly browsing a newspaper, Danish TV employees came across the story of Danish citizen Peter Lundin, who had been convicted of murdering his mother.

Organizer Jesper Klit then wrote a letter to Lundin asking if he would participate in an interview with Danish television. Lundin agreed, and the interview was arranged with American prison authorities who had a very liberal attitude towards media interviewing inmates.

During the broadcast, Lundin colored one part of his face black and the other white, to symbolize "good and evil". After viewing the interview, renowned Swedish psychiatrist, Professor Sten Levander, awarded Lundin 39 points (of a possible 40) on the Psychopathy Checklist. The documentary was broadcast on TV 2 on December 14, 1994.

=== Release and deportation ===
Lundin was released after serving barely half of his sentence. At the time, the state of North Carolina had a desperate lack of prison capacity. The serious lack of space was due to, among other things, a large number of prisoners from the US Army, most of whom came from Fort Bragg. North Carolina, therefore, chose to halve the sentences of prisoners imprisoned after a certain date. State law at the time did not allow convicts to serve sentences in other US states.

On June 4, 1999, Lundin and a 4-person US police escort arrived at Copenhagen Airport. After his arrival, Peter moved in with his wife, Tina Lundin, whom he had married in 1996 while serving his sentence in North Carolina, and her teenage daughter in Måløv.

== Second conviction ==
=== Triple murder ===
In the fall of 1999, after a violent attack on his wife and her daughter resulted in him being thrown out of the apartment, Peter moved into the Men's Home in Nørrebro. While living there, he visited a brothel on Fasanvej 239 in Copenhagen, where he subsequently met Marianne Pedersen, an employee of the brothel.

Marianne Pedersen (1963–2000) was 36 years old, an early retiree and had been a widow for a year. Her late husband was a former painter, and even before his death, they started a massage clinic (a small brothel) at Fasanvej, where she earned money as a sex worker. Pedersen and her two sons, Dennis and Brian, lived in the Copenhagen suburb of Rødovre. Lundin and Marianne subsequently became lovers.

On July 3, 2000, Pedersen and her sons were declared missing by her older stepson. He contacted police because he was worried that he could not reach Pedersen or the boys on their cellphones. He had found a note on her front door that said they had gone on a vacation. The note was unusually worded and alarmed the stepson, who then went into the house to look for the family. He found the home in disarray with the furniture moved away from the walls, trash lying around, vomit in both toilets, and a strange smell in the basement.

After filing a missing person's report, police began investigating the disappearances. Upon an initial search of the house, it appeared there were discrete blood stains scattered around the house. Further investigation revealed blood stains in Pedersen's bed, her car and in the cellar, traces of blood between bathroom tiles and even on a chopping board and a blender in the kitchen.

Police went to Lundin's home address and searched the premises. Lundin claimed that Pedersens were on holiday, and that he had agreed to paint their house while they were away. However, on July 5, 2000, Lundin was arrested, charged with murder, and detained for four weeks. Further investigation led to the conclusion that Pedersen and her two sons had been killed and dismembered. The first victim had been dismembered in the basement while the other two were dismembered in the garage. A recently cleaned freezer located in a shed at the Pedersen property also had traces of blood inside.

Deputy Chief Inspector Niels Kjøller from Hvidovre Criminal Police told the press: "Both places looked like slaughterhouses, even though Peter had tried to erase his tracks by cleaning up." From remnants of human tissue, the police technicians were able to observe that Lundin had used an angle grinder in the garage, and there were about 100 visible cutting marks on the floor, revealing that he had used an axe.

Lundin changed his explanation after three weeks. He explained that he had heard screams from the basement at night between June 16 and 17, 2000. In the basement, he found the two boys lying on the floor. They had been stabbed by Marianne, whom he claimed had ingested drugs and was unconscious. He then began to beat her because she had killed the boys. He said that, although he had not struck her "seriously," she died shortly after. He did not call the police as he thought they would not believe his story because of his past and had instead decided to dismember the bodies.

On October 10, 2000, he confessed to killing them. He explained that he had quarrelled with Marianne because she "had spoken sweetly" on the phone with another man. Subsequently, Lundin fought with Pedersen and her sons on her double bed, where he broke their necks with his bare hands. After the murders, he placed the bodies in the freezers located in the home. This story was not quite corroborated by forensic evidence, however, as it was reasonably determined that one of the boys had died in the basement, and investigators found it unlikely that he had broken their necks the way he claimed.

On June 19, 2000, Lundin went shopping at a Metro in Glostrup, where he bought an axe, rubber gloves, plastic bags and cleaning agents. After dismembering the bodies. Lundin put the body parts in plastic bags, which he then placed in bulk waste containers outside the house. These were then taken for incineration. He probably drove further around Zealand in Marianne's Ford Mondeo and placed smaller body parts in various waste containers. About 10,000 metric tons (roughly 22 million pounds) of refuse were investigated at Vestforbrænding, as well as at a waste site in Holme-Ostrup near Næstved. In addition, with the help of the Danish Emergency Management Agency, the entire Vestvolden was searched. However, the bodies of Pedersen and her two sons have never been recovered.

== The trial ==
The trial of Peter Lundin was scheduled at the Østre Landsret on March 5, 2001. Just a few days before, the police and state prosecutor Erik Merlung hoped that Lundin would admit his guilt to deliberate manslaughter. However, it did not happen this time, and the case therefore had to be decided by judges and jurors. The chairman started by addressing directly [...] the twelve jurors with the following remark: "In recent years, few cases have attracted so much attention as this jury case we will be dealing with today, of the line that applies to publicity of criminal cases."

In addition, the President pointed out the concern about the influence that both judges and jurors had inevitably been exposed through the media's mentions of the case over the nearly eight months since the arrest. Directly addressing the jurors, he said: "By your subsequent decision in the case, you must not take into account anything that you have NOT been informed here in the courtroom, TV, etc. You also have to look away from what you have heard or seen outside the courtroom during the course of the trial."

=== Judgments ===
Peter Lundin insisted that he did not mean to kill his victims, but the jurors did not believe him, and found him guilty of intentional murder and manslaughter. As a detail, he was also convicted of theft, from the house at Nørregardsvej. Prosecutor Attorney General Erik Merlung said soberly and calmly in his criminal record procedure: "The circumstances, nature and extent of the crimes committed by the defendant are in a state of horror and fright. One can only respond to these as a society and take the right security measures by imposing a lifetime sentence."

Lundin's lawyer Bjørn Lund Hansen made a vigorous effort to get the jurors to sentence his client a timed penalty of approximately sixteen years. Lund Hansen called his client's actions "obnoxious" and "creepy", but nevertheless appealed to jurors and judges to settle for giving Lundin 16 years imprisonment for the murders. He compared Lundin's three murders to the case of the doctor Elisabeth Wæver, who was sentenced to life for a murderous arson attack against her lover's wife and two children: "Killing by fire is an aggravation. It is an expression of a carefully planned crime, while my client's actions are spontaneous and impulsive." Before the jurors retired to testify to the length of the punishment, Lundin had the opportunity to say the last words to the jurors and he took advantage of it: "We must all have peace now. We must have peace in our mind and in our soul."

The judges and jurors eventually chose to listen to the prosecutor. On March 15, 2001, after ten days of court hearings, the three country judges Niels Johan Petersen, Ejler Bruun and Hans Christian Thomsen delivered the verdict on Peter Lundin: life imprisonment. The lifetime sentence was unanimous and came after only 10 minutes of voting. All 24 votes were given for life imprisonment (in a jury trial, the 12 jurors each have one vote and the three professional judges every four votes when the punishment is met). Lundin asked for some time to think, and even though he had the opportunity to appeal the sentence to the Supreme Court, he did not.

The father, Ole Lundin, was not convicted of complicity or involvement in the disposal of the three bodies. However, he was convicted of theft of several of Marianne Pedersen's personal belongings, which the police found during a search on his residence at Strandvejen 201 in Hellerup. Judge Jes Schioler believed that even though Ole Lundin, due to his age and other personal circumstances, would normally only be in a conditional punishment or community service, the circumstances of the theft were serious enough that it should be reflected in the punishment: he was sentenced to 4 months of unconditional imprisonment on June 7, 2002.

=== Death penalty ===
In the spring of 2001, "The National Association for the Execution of Peter Lundin" was founded by the former convicted smuggler and heavyweight boxer Mark Hulstrøm, and other anonymous people. The association did not demand reinstatement of the death penalty in the criminal code, but that the Folketing adopt a special law that would give the death penalty exclusively to Peter Lundin.

Lundin apparently believed that the death penalty was in effect in Denmark at the time, explaining this on a cassette tape in the prison, which Ekstra Bladet came into possession of in 2008. Due to this belief, he also thought he could not be convicted of murder if he disposed of the bodies.

== Political controversy ==
Danish police have subsequently been blamed for not keeping a watchful eye on Peter Lundin after he was handed over to Denmark. The US Department of Interpol had routinely informed the Copenhagen Police that the four escorting officers from North Carolina were on their way with a murderous man who had been expelled to Denmark after he had passed his punishment in the US. The Danish police responded routinely, but since they had nothing outstanding against Lundin in Denmark, they considered him a normal Danish citizen. In any case, no special attention was paid to him after his arrival at the Copenhagen Airport on June 4, 1999.

The fact that Danish police had not monitored Peter Lundin from the moment he set foot in Denmark, led MP Eva Kjer Hansen (Venstre) to ask questions to then-Minister of Justice Frank Jensen (Social Democrats) on November 4, 2000: "Will the Minister explain [in] the case of Peter Lundin [...] why the man was not supervised by the police after arriving in Denmark, and [...] what initiatives the minister will take to avoid a similar situation in the future?"

The Justice Minister replied 14 days later, after first consulting with both the Police Chief in Gladsaxe and the Copenhagen police director: "Upon arrival, the person was received by the Copenhagen Police, but released immediately after arrival, as he was not wanted in the Central Criminal Register. Interpol-Copenhagen, prior to arriving at Copenhagen Airport, the US authorities informed the police without receiving any further information about the Danish citizen in question. Interpol-Copenhagen informed the Copenhagen Police of the arrival, and when his father's residence was then resident in Gentofte Police District, Interpol-Copenhagen also informed the Police Chief in Gentofte. The chief of police in Gladsaxe has told the Ministry of Justice that the Danish citizen in question, after arriving, stayed with a girlfriend in Ballerup, (the police and the Ministry of Justice seemed unaware that Peter and Tina Lundin were already married at that time) why the person was sent from Gentofte police to the Police Chief in Gladsaxe. During the Criminal Investigation in Gladsaxe, the submitted documents were reviewed, and at a subsequent staff meeting, the staff were informed, in accordance with usual practice, of matters relating to the person concerned, and the staff were informed that they should be aware of the person's behavior when they took him or others received information about him, for example in connection with filed reviews."

"On the specific case, it can be stated, moreover, that the Ministry of Justice already in 1996 addressed the US authorities with a view to transferring the Danish citizen in question for enforcement in Denmark, which, however, the US authorities refused." The then-Minister of Justice Frank Jensen then explained, among other things, the possibilities of the Criminal Code for supervision of previously punished persons, and he added: "In principle, in my view, speaking against a more systematic and intensive monitoring speaks of previously convicted persons when there is no suspicion of further offenses."

== Personal life ==
=== Detention and assault ===
While Lundin was in custody on July 27, 2000, in Vridsløselille Prison, he was attacked by several inmates. He was struck with an iron tube, which broke his nose.

In February 2002, he was attacked again when he was beaten by fellow inmates with a frying pan on his head. He filed a case and demanded 10,000 DKK in compensation for the harm done. On April 16, 2002, he was awarded 510 DKK in compensation by the Østre Landsret. In 2007, he was transferred to the top-secured State Prison of East Jutland. However, he has subsequently been moved back to the Institution of Herstedvester again.

=== Incarcerated marriages ===
After the airing of The American Dream on TV 2 in 1994, many Danish women contacted Peter Lundin and in 1996 he married one of them, a woman named Tina.

On September 28, 2008, he was married to Mariann Poulsen in Statsfængslet Østjylland but filed for divorce 11 days later. Poulsen claimed that Lundin had lied to her about another woman he was in a relationship with while they were married. She revealed this when she appeared on GO Aften Danmark on October 9, 2008.

On May 26, 2011, Lundin married a woman named Bettina. They were together from 2009 until 3 October 2017.

=== Drugs ===
On August 21, 2006, Lundin was sentenced to 40 days in prison by the Court of Glostrup for holding 92.7 grams of cannabis in his prison cell.

He was again sentenced to 10 days in prison by the Court of Glostrup on April 23, 2012, for having 8.5 grams of cannabis and four amphetamine pills on July 26, 2011. Lundin was accused in September 2012 to be behind the smuggling of cannabis and other substances in the Institute of Herstedvester.

=== Name change ===
In November 2011, Lundin changed his name to Niels Schaftner, but this was later changed to Bjarne Skounborg.

== Appeals ==
=== Lawsuit against journalist ===
A journalist on the Danish newspaper Information, Kristian Ditlev Jensen, called Peter Lundin a psychopath by writing the sentence "We are, basically, not clinical psychopaths in the Peter Lundin category" (Danish: Vi er, kort sagt, ikke kliniske psykopater i Peter Lundin-klassen) in an editorial not otherwise about Peter Lundin. This prompted Lundin to file a lawsuit. The lawsuit was settled in court, clearing the journalist by explaining that the "sentence should be taken as a statement that the plaintiff is a clear-cut example of a psychopath in the sense of a deviating person" (Danish: Sætningen skal forstås som en udtalelse om, at sagsøgeren er et klart eksempel på en psykopat i betydningen karakterafvigende person).

=== Lawsuit against Pia Kjærsgaard ===
On November 18, 2008, the then Danish People's Party chairman Pia Kjærsgaard commented on Peter Lundin on the breakfast show Go' morgen Danmark, where she said: "He is simply as callous as you possibly can be" (Danish: Han er jo simpelthen så afstumpet, som nogen kan være). In February 2009 this got Lundin to sue Kjærsgaard for DKK 100,000 for defamation. Lundin's lawyer Peter Hjørne stated to the press that she has called him as callous as anyone can be, and that it was against all citizens of the country who are protected.

At the Court in Lyngby on March 4, 2010, the court dismissed Lundin's claim for DKK 100,000 in compensation and Kjærsgaard was acquitted. The judge emphasized that the Dansk Sprognævn had stated during the case that synonyms for the word "afstumpet" (~"callous") are insensitive, brutal, emotional, rough and raw. In addition, the court also emphasized that the statements by Kjærsgaard were made in a public television debate in a breakfast show and as part of a more general criticism of the media's coverage of persons convicted of serious crime. In addition, the court also emphasized the nature of the extremely serious crimes that Lundin was convicted of.

=== Case against DR hosts ===
On February 28, 2014, Lundin sued the Cavling Prize-nominee DR host Line Gertsen and DR host Kim Bildsøe Lassen for libel. Specifically, he believed that they had crossed the line when, in September, 2012 in a feature on the news (TV-Avisen), they accused him of being responsible for smuggling hash into Herstedvester Prison, where he was imprisoned. Lundin's lawyer, Tage Siboni, stated that; "False allegations have been set forward in TV-Avisen against two people - Bjarne Skounborg (Peter Lundin) and an unnamed woman. DR have been asked to rectify this, but they refuse. Therefore, we have filed a case."

Prior to the feature mentioned, the TV newspaper was in possession of a report which allegedly revealed that Lundin was the man behind the cannabis sale in prison. The law defamation case was heard [at the Copenhagen City Court. Here, Lundin demanded compensation of DKK 25,000 and correction of the news piece.

On March 28, 2014, Line Gertsen and Kim Bildsøe Lassen were acquitted of libel against Lundin. At the same time, the court decided that Peter Lundin and his wife had to pay all the legal costs within fourteen days, corresponding to DKK 20,000.

The verdict was as follows:

"It s known that the defendants, Line Gertsen and Kim Bildsøe Lassen, are dismissed. The applicants and Betinna Brøns must pay jointly within fourteen days to pay the costs of the defendants Line Gertsen and Kim with DKK 20,000.

== Media ==
The publishing house of Danish newspaper Ekstra Bladet sparked a lot of debate when it announced plans in 2001 to cooperate with Lundin to writing his memoir. The plans, however, were dropped shortly after the announcement - on the grounds that the book would not contain enough "news and quality content."

In 2002, TvDanmark2 asked for the program Sensing Murder, where clairvoyants tried to find the bodies of Marianne Pedersen and her two sons. Many places on Zealand, including landfills and cemeteries near Faxe and Køge were investigated, but the clairvoyants failed to find the bodies.

In 2003, the book Sagen Lundin. Forbrydelsen, opklaringen, medierne og ondskaben (The Lundin Case. The crime, the investigation, the media, and the evil) by Palle Bruus Jensen was released, including analyses by a psychiatrist, Henrik Day Poulsen.

In 2009, Lundin and the co-author Rikke Pedersen published the book titled A Murderer's Confessions from the publishing house Turbulenz. The book is an autobiography in which he talks about his childhood, his close relationship with his mother, and life behind the bars. It was initially not a great success, but after a month had sold 5,000 copies.

== See also ==
- List of serial killers by country
