= Enner Mark Prison =

Prison in East Jutland, Denmark

- Interactive map of Enner Mark Prison
- Location: near Lund, East Jutland; 55°54′24″N 9°42′39″E
- Status: open
- Security class: maximum security
- Capacity: 228 inmates
- Opened: October 2, 2006
- Former name: State Prison of East Jutland
- Managed by: Danish Prison and Probation Service (Danish: Kriminalforsorgen)
- Governor: Anette Bækgaard Jakobsen
- Website: kriminalforsorgen.dk

Notable prisoners
- Marcel Lychau Hansen (The Amager Man); Hammad Khürshid; Abdoulghani Tokhi; Jørgen "Fehår" Nielsen (former); Elisabeth Wæver (former)

Enner Mark Prison (Danish: Enner Mark Fængsel), until February 2016 the State Prison of East Jutland (Danish: Statsfængslet Østjylland), is a modern and purpose-built closed prison in Denmark. It is the first since the establishment of the State Prison in Ringe in 1976. The prison replaced the 150-year-old and run-down Horsens State Prison and was opened on 2 October 2006 by the then Minister of Justice Lene Espersen. The prison is located at Enner Mark near the village of Lund, 10 kilometers west of Horsens, East Jutland.

Together with Storstrøm Prison, the prison is considered Denmark's most secure and is often considered one of the most secure in the Nordic countries. A key feature is the division of the prison into five independent and isolated parts within a 6 meter high, 1,400 meter long prison wall. The division is designed to improve security and give better quality of life for inmates serving a sentence. Physically separating more vulnerable inmates is intended to help prevent violence and exploitative relationships between the prisoners.

The prison has capacity for 228 inmates in total, divided between the separate parts, who are mostly from Funen and Jutland. There are subsections for social interaction, the serving of short prison sentences or remand, psychological help, drugs rehabilitation (in the so-called 'contract divisions', (Danish: kontraktafsnit), where prisoners can self-refer and agree to especially strict drug controls), and medical facilities. Additionally there are special facilities for inmates serving gang-related sentences, particularly problematic prisoners, and isolation. Since 1 January 2014, there has also been a section for inmates awaiting extradition.

Since 2017, the governor is Anette Bækgaard Jakobsen.

== Background ==
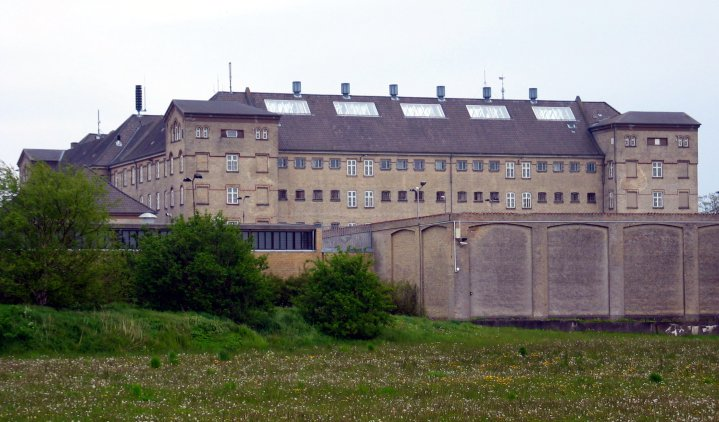
The old Horsens State Prison, which was replaced by the State Prison of East Jutland

In 1998, a working group under the Danish Prison and Probation Service (Danish: Kriminalforsorgen) carried out a joint country-wide investigation with the now-defunct Danish Defence Construction Service (danish: Forsvarets Bygningstjeneste). This included a detailed analysis and evaluation of the Prison and Probation Service's buildings, with comments on the extent of the need for renovation, rebuilding, and new construction. A large number of the buildings were declared run-down and unsuitable by modern standards. The audit concluded that in order to provide correctional facilities meeting modern Danish requirements for prisoner rehabilitation and employment opportunities during incarceration, all closed prisons (with the exception of the State Prison in Ringe) should be replaced completely within 25 years.

The first steps towards fulfilling the recommendation were taken later that year in the 1998 state budget and subsequently in the Prison and Probation Service's operational agreement for the period 1999 to 2003. It was decided that Horsens State Prison would be the first to be replaced.

In 1999, a working group under the Prison and Probation Service was established to give a specification for the new prison's construction consistent with the modern function and security requirements established by the 1998 audit. This involved trips to Canada, Sweden, Norway, Holland and Poland to research recent prison modernisation. This group then become the project managers for the actual realisation of the prison, which was internally named State Prison of East Jutland.

In June 2001, the working group delivered their report with specifications for the State Prison of East Jutland. The report gave best-practice recommendations for the prison and commented on how the relevant legal requirements would be met. This report formed the basis of the working group's further activity which first consisted of the establishment of several subsidiary working groups with representatives from the old Horsens State Prison and trade groups. This led to further recommendations regarding for example security, employment facilities for inmates, prison employee facilities, and cell design.

=== Construction ===
Later in June 2001, the working group delivered a finished construction plan and tendered for the building of the prison to firms in the European Union. Tendering finished in December 2001 and the contract was won by the Aarhus-based architects Friis & Moltke. Construction began in March 2003 with the installation of utilities and the raising of the main concrete prison wall. The first ground was broken on 19 March 2003 by the then Minister of Justice Lene Espersen who at the same event publicly announced the name State Prison of East Jutland.

In Autumn 2003, an 48-inmate capacity increase was authorised, to give a total capacity of 228 inmates distributed amongst 4 standard sections and one especially secure section. Construction of the prison buildings began in August 2004 and was completed by Summer 2006. The prison was officially opened on 2 October 2006 and received its first inmates shortly after on 16 October 2006. Construction costs totaled 403 million DKK.

Including the outer security zone, the prison occupies a total area of 65 hectares. In 2008, it was awarded the Horsens Municipality architecture prize.

== Operation ==
Enner Mark Prison has five separate sections. Three are identical, with capacity for 48 inmates each. The fourth is for remanded prisoners and those serving short sentences. The fifth section is for solitary confinement and particularly problematic prisoners (often those with connections to Danish motorcycle gangs) and also houses medical facilities. Other facilities include social areas with attached bathrooms and toilets, a cultural centre with attached church, a mosque, a sports hall, a supermarket, a gym, and special visiting areas.

The prison is characterised by very modern security. Key use is almost zero with the vast majority of doors using biometric fingerprint locks. All outside areas are under video surveillance and motion sensors/infrared cameras are installed throughout the complex. The site has over 300 CCTV cameras.

Approximately 300 staff are employed by the prison. The first governor was Jørgen Bang. Following Bang's sudden death in June 2014, Niels Kløve Larsen became the governor in January 2015. Larsen stood down in September 2016, having been on long-term sick leave since May 2016. Anette Bækgaard Jakobsen became the incumbent governor in 2017.

=== Day-to-day experience and employment ===
The prison has a range of employment opportunities for inmates. A full-time 37-hour work week is standard with options including fabric, metal, furniture, and envelope workshops, gardening/landscaping, cleaning, and further manufacturing assembly tasks. Inmates are required to pursue employment.

In addition to normal higher education, adult education schemes to improve literacy and numeracy are offered. Treatment programs for alcohol and substance abuse are also available.

=== Violence and escapes ===
- On 12 October 2009, a 36-year-old inmate attempted to strangle a guard. The inmate was in an observation cell awaiting an escort to the toilet - he produced a noose and was stopped with the assistance of further guards. The man was later charged with attempted murder.
- On 18 September 2011, in connection with unrest in the prison's C1 section, Abdoulghani Tokhi (imprisoned on terrorism charges) stabbed a fellow inmate in the arm with a potato peeler blade.
- On 20 February 2012, a 27-year-old inmate was stabbed in the skull by a fellow 29-year-old inmate.
- On 13 July 2012, during an 8-year sentence for attempted murder, the gang leader Mohammed Figuigui (also known as "The Painter") made a successful escape attempt. He impersonated another inmate taking an authorised, unsupervised excursion. Figuigui was later recaptured on 7 December 2013.
- In 2017, prison guards reported significant problems with violence and threats towards staff in the section for gang-related inmates.

== Notable inmates ==
=== Current inmates ===
Name	Status	Details
Marcel Lychau Hansen (The Amager Man)	Serving a life sentence in the maximum security wing.	Sentenced to life imprisonment at Copenhagen City Court on 22 December 2011 for aggravated murder, lust murder and six counts of rape.
Hammad Khürshid	Serving a 12-year prison sentence.	Sentenced to 12 years in prison at Frederiksberg Courthouse on 21 October 2008 for his role in the so-called Glasvej terror plot.
Abdoulghani Tokhi	Serving a 9-year prison sentence.	Sentenced to 7 years in prison at Frederiksberg Courthouse on 21 October 2008 for his role in the so-called Glasvej terror plot. Following an appeal at the high court the sentence was increased to 8 years, and in 2011 a further 1 years' imprisonment was added for knife crime.

=== Former inmates ===
Name	Status	Details
Jørgen "Fehår" Nielsen	Released on probation on 27 June 2013 after 17 years' imprisonment.	Sentenced to 16 years in prison in 1997, which the year after was increased to life imprisonment for murder and attempted murder during the Great Nordic Biker War.
Elisabeth Wæver	Served 11 years at Herstedvester Prison, after which she was transferred to the then State Prison of East Jutland. She was released on probation in 2010.	Sentenced to life imprisonment on 23 October 1996 for arson and the murder of her lover's wife and sons.
