= Human rights in Denmark =

Human rights in the Kingdom of Denmark are protected by the state's Constitution of the Realm (Danmarks Riges Grundlov); applying equally in Denmark proper, Greenland and the Faroe Islands, and through the ratification of international human rights treaties. Denmark has held a significant role in the adoption of both the European Convention on Human Rights and in the establishment of the European Court of Human Rights (ECHR). In 1987, the Kingdom Parliament (Folketinget) established a national human rights institution, the Danish Centre of Human Rights, now the Danish Institute for Human Rights.

While Denmark and other Scandinavian countries have historically been "defenders of international law and human rights", issues in regard to human rights still exist or have emerged in recent times, including violence against women, the rights of LGBTI people, as well as mass surveillance of marginalized groups.

In its 2024 Freedom in the World report, Freedom House rated the country "free" with a score of 97 (out of 100).

== History ==
=== Constitutional Act of the Realm of Denmark ===
Personal liberty shall be inviolable. No Danish subject shall in any manner whatever be deprived of his liberty because of his political or religious convictions or because of his descent.

— Section 71

The Kingdom of Denmark is a constitutional monarchy. The Constitutional Act or (Grundloven), which was adopted on 5 June 1849, lays the foundations of democracy in the organisation of the Realm of Denmark.

The Constitution has been amended three times since its adoption in 1849. The most significant of these amendments occurred in 1953, leading to the Constitution in use today, as it granted "clear constitutional authority to share Denmark's sovereignty with other countries". This was important as it aimed to prepare Denmark for the potential membership to the European Union.

While the role of the Constitutional Act is to restrict the authority of the monarchy, it is also to ensure that human rights as well as civil and political rights are guaranteed for Danish citizens. Examples of these include the right to Personal Liberty (Section 71), Freedom of Expression (Section 77) and Freedom of Assembly (Section 79).

In addition, the Constitution guarantees Freedom of Religion (Section 67), provided that these religious communities do not threaten "good morals or public order".

These rights, enshrined in the Constitution, enjoy "special status.". In addition, as outlined in Section 88 of the Constitution, these rights are the "supreme source of Danish law"

=== European Convention on Human Rights ===
The European Convention on Human Rights (ECHR) is a treaty that was ratified by 47 member states of the Council of Europe on 3 September 1953. The aim of the treaty is to both "protect the rule of law" and to endorse democracy in Europe. The European Convention was the first treaty to provide institutional means of supervising and enforcing human rights across Europe. To achieve this, the convention established two enforcement measures - the European Commission of Human Rights and the European Court of Human Rights.

Although ratified in 1953, the convention was not incorporated in Danish law until 29 April 1992. As a result of its incorporation in domestic law, courts of Denmark have a duty to enforce the convention. The European Convention on Human Rights is the only treaty concerning human rights in Danish law at present. Significant civil and political rights that are guaranteed by the European Convention on Human Rights include the right to liberty, right to a fair trial, freedom of thought, freedom of conscience and freedom of religion and freedom of expression.

=== European Court of Human Rights ===
The European Court of Human Rights (ECtHR or ECHR), established in 1959 by the European Convention on Human Rights, is the Council of Europe's court of law. Its purpose is to examine and make judgments on complaints of alleged human rights violations.

In the early stages of the ECtHR's foundation, the Scandinavian countries were some of the first to agree to the optional clauses on its jurisdiction, thus strengthening its political legitimacy. In addition, Denmark and the other Nordic states were prominent figures in the preliminary construction of the ECtHR system, and in its finalisation.

== Key topics in the Constitution ==
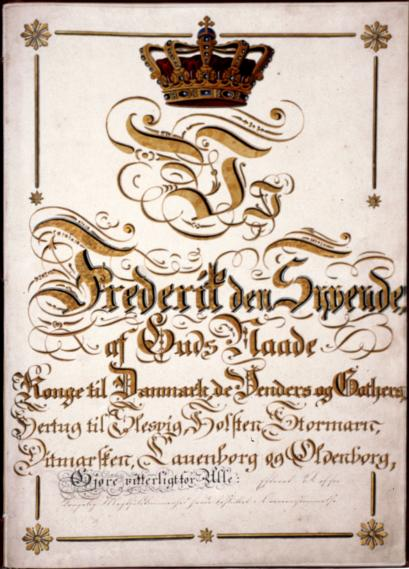
"Grundloven" - The Constitution of the Realm of Denmark 1849

=== Civil rights and freedoms ===
==== Section 71: Personal liberty ====
Section 71 of the Constitution focuses on inalienable rights, as well as ensuring citizens' protection from unreasonable restraint and guaranteeing one's right to a fair trial. The direct quote below outlines the fact that a Danish citizen cannot be detained due to their religion, race or political view:

Personal liberty shall be inviolable. No Danish subject shall in any manner whatever be deprived of his liberty because of his political or religious convictions or because of his descent.

— Article 71, Constitution of Denmark, 1953

==== Section 77: Freedom of expression ====
Section 77 of the Constitution guarantees freedom of speech, and freedom of the press, both of which are recognised as human rights under the Universal Declaration of Human Rights (UDHR). While the government largely respects these rights, legal restrictions are in place for libel, blasphemy and racism.

In March 2015, discussions surrounding the removal of legal restrictions for blasphemy were suspended as the Government of Denmark confirmed that its anti blasphemy law would remain in place.

==== Section 79: Freedom of assembly ====
Section 79 of the Constitution protects citizens' right to gather for peaceful assembly. This is recognised as a human right under international human rights instruments such as the Universal Declaration of Human Rights and the European Convention on Human Rights. Freedom of Assembly is understood as the right to protest peacefully, and without arms.

Section 79 also provides that if an assembly is a threat to public peace, it may be dissolved by the police.

=== Freedom of religion ===
==== Section 67: Freedom of religion ====
In its 2024 Freedom in the World report, Freedom House rated the country 4 out of 4 for religious freedom.

Freedom of religion is regarded as a fundamental human right, as outlined in Article 18 of the Universal Declaration of Human Rights. In addition it is entrenched in Section 67 of the Danish Constitution, which provides that citizens are entitled to establish and join religious congregations or communities. However, it also specifies that a religious group may not present a threat to "good morals or the public order".

With the rise in religious extremism, government restrictions on religion are beginning to increase.

Examples include the Kingdom parliament's ban on wearing full face veils, enacted in May 2018. This law is seen as problematic as it targets less than 0.1% of Denmark's population — Muslim women whose choose to wear the niqab or the burqa.

In addition, a law introduced in 2019 requires a person to shake hands with officials at their naturalisation ceremony if they wish to take Danish citizenship. This has prompted human rights concerns in regard to freedom of religion as it is argued it targets Muslim and Jewish groups who demonstrate "lack of assimilation". The Danish Government, however, maintains that this law has been established solely to elevate a "social custom to a national value".

== Sources of human rights in international law ==
=== Universal Declaration of Human Rights ===
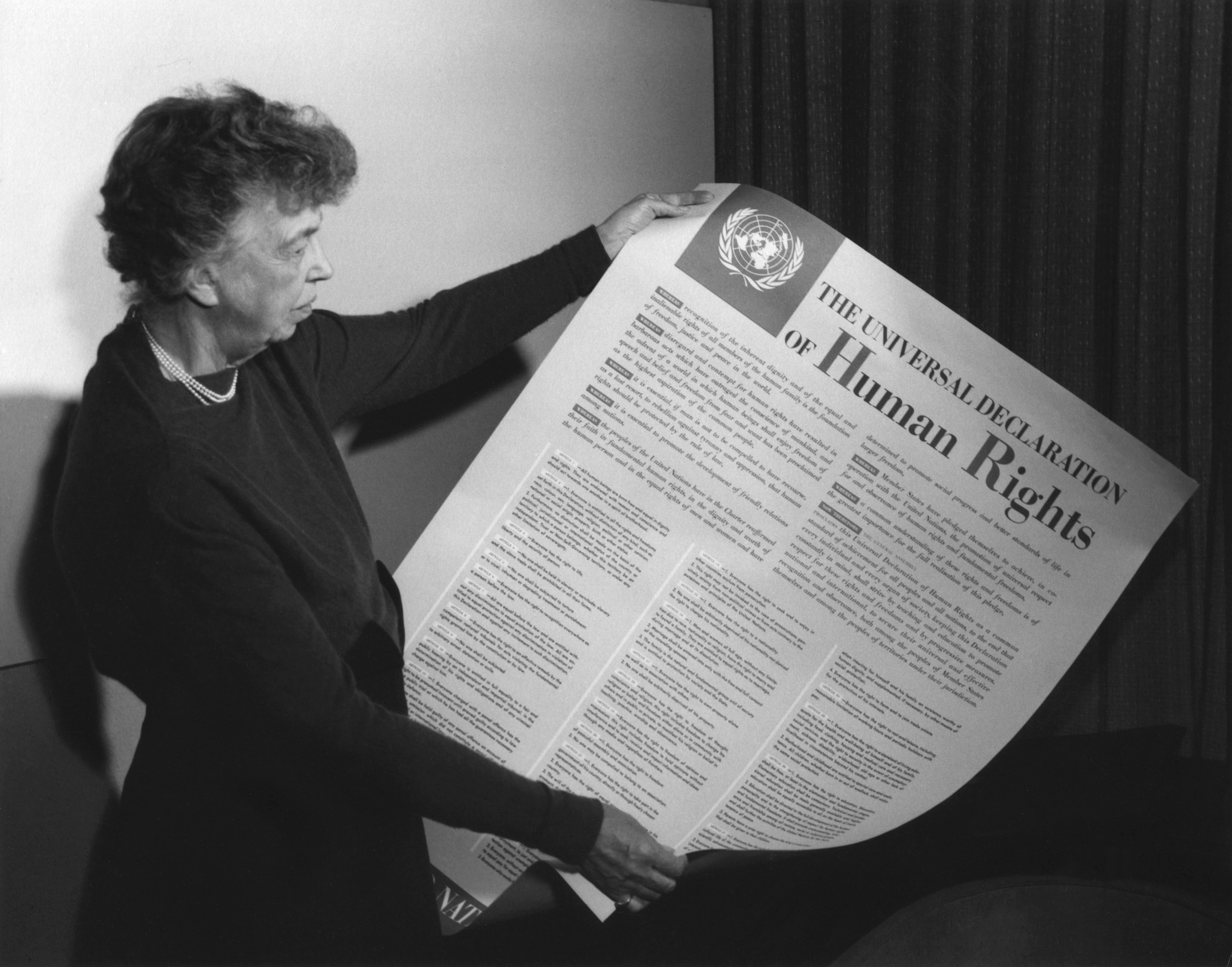
Eleanor Roosevelt with the Universal Declaration of Human Rights

Following the atrocities of World War II, the international community established the United Nations in 1945. In order to promote international peace and equality, they developed the Universal Declaration of Human Rights (UDHR), which was adopted by the United Nations General Assembly on 10 December 1948. The declaration was established as "a common standard of achievements for all peoples and all nations".

The UDHR was the first of its kind, as it was a codification of human rights without discrimination and incorporated entitlements that related to all spheres of human life and personality. Although it is not a treaty and therefore not legally binding, it was hoped that it would serve as a model for domestic laws and later binding treaties. In addition, the UDHR, which is still in use today, acts as a mechanism to uphold values such as "universal equality and freedom, supporting decolonisation, good governance and the struggle against discrimination".

=== Involvement in international human rights campaigns ===
On 21 April 1967, the elected government in Greece was overthrown in a coup d'état led by a group of Greek colonels (military junta) In September 1967, the Nordic states including Denmark, Sweden, Norway and the Netherlands appealed to the European Commission of Human Rights to hold Greece accountable for their violation of what are considered to be human rights by the European Convention on Human Rights. As a result, the Council of Europe passed a resolution on 15 April 1970 that made the Report of the Human Rights Commission on the Greek Case public. This report found that, as initially put forward by the Nordic states, many of the human rights under the European Convention on Human Rights had been violated by the Greek government.

Furthermore, from the 1970s the Nordic states played a significant role in supporting non-governmental human rights organisations and actors. For example, the Helsinki Watch, a non-governmental organisation based in the U.S. and established in 1978, was crucial to advocating for human rights in this period. The Helsinki Watch led the formation of the International Helsinki Federation for Human Rights (IHF) founded in 1982. As early as 1985, the IHF had committees in a number of European countries including Denmark. This early support for international human rights is what has secured its reputation in Denmark as a "vehicle of progressive change."

== Current issues ==
=== Refugees and asylum seekers ===
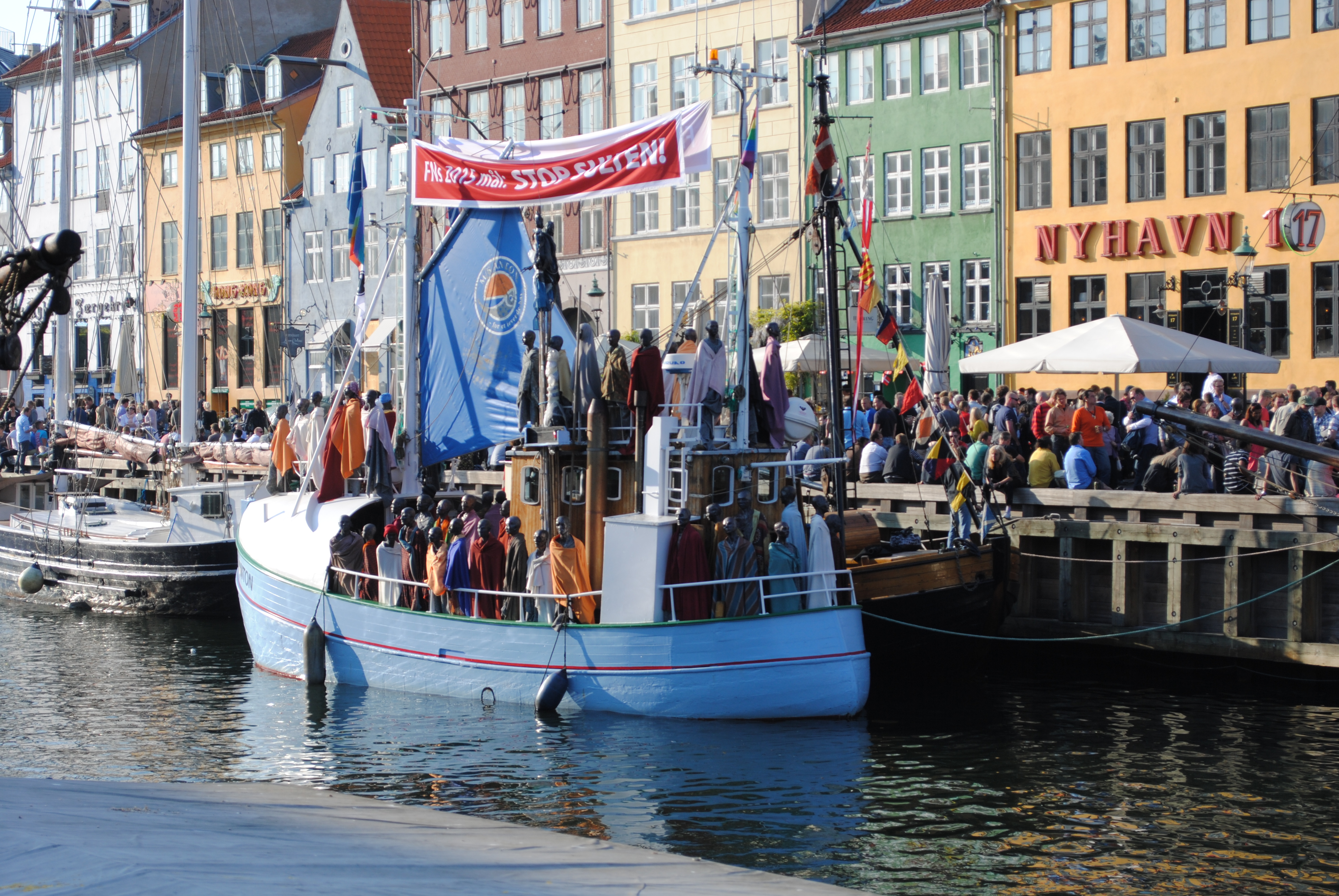
"The Refugee Ship," a sculpture by Jens Galschiot exhibited at Nyhavn in Denmark

Denmark is argued by some to have some of Europe's "most aggressive anti-immigrant policies." The people of Denmark are largely divided in their opinions on immigration – some accepting of it and others who are concerned and thus want restrictive policies in place.

In 2016, the Danish annulled its agreement with the United Nations High Commissioner for Refugees (UNHCR) that stated that it would receive 500 refugees on an annual basis for resettlement.

In 2018, Denmark announced that it would no longer resettle refugees under the United Nations' quota system, with the decision to accept refugees being made by the government and not the parliament.

In addition, in late 2018 the Danish government announced that the 2019 budget would include funding for a scheme that would see foreign criminals who had completed jail sentences, but could not be deported, to be moved to Lindholm Island. Lindholm Island is located three kilometres out from the southeast of Denmark, and had previously been a laboratory for animals with highly contagious diseases. The policy has been labelled as being "barbaric" and "deeply repulsive."

In January 2021, European Website on Integration reported that, "Denmark does not subscribe to EU rules in what related to refugee and legal issues and Denmark has refused to participate in a voluntary distribution agreement within EU."

In March 2021, the Danish government announced limits on 'non-western' immigrants, it revoked the residency permits of refugees and vulnerable asylum seekers. Also, a major local study revealed that a third of the refugees were not properly protected.

Moreover, on 19 May 2021, Denmark faced condemnation from EU lawmakers, the UNHCR, and human rights groups for revoking residency status for Syrian refugees. Despite the critical security situation in Syria, Denmark claimed that some parts of the country are now safe enough for refugees to return. Besides, in April 2021, Euro-Mediterranean Human Rights Monitor called on Denmark to return to the decision to return Syrian refugees to Syria and considered that Denmark's designation of Syria as 'safe' is dangerous, inhumane, and illegal.

=== Violence against women ===
In 2014, Denmark ratified the Istanbul Convention (the Council of Europe's Convention on Preventing and Combating Violence against Women and Domestic Violence). It classifies "rape and all other non-consensual acts of a sexual nature" as being criminal offences. However, the definition of rape in domestic Danish law is not based on the notion of consent and is instead based on the presence of "physical violence, threat or coercion" or "if the victim is found to have been unable to resist."

This is deemed to be problematic as the assumption that a victim gives their consent to a sexual act if they do not resist it physically ignores the possibility of "involuntary paralysis" or "freezing," and thus the inability to resist.

In 2014 also, the European Union Agency for Fundamental Rights said that, "Denmark has the highest spread rate of physical and sexual violence against women in Europe." In addition, several reports say that Denmark has the highest prevalence of sexual violence in Europe. Also, Amnesty International indicated that Denmark has "widespread sexual violence" and systemic problems in how it deals with rape. According to studies conducted, state that around 5,100 women a year are victims of rape or attempted rape. A report published by Amnesty International in March 2019 states that women in Denmark rarely reported rape due to a "lack of trust in the justice system" and the poor treatment of victims throughout the legal process. Also, Denmark has received harsh criticism for inadequate laws in regard to sexual violence.

In April 2018, the Danish opposition proposed the introduction of a "consent-based definition of rape" as outlined under the Istanbul Convention. This was rejected in Parliament. In addition, pressure was put on the Danish government by the Council of Europe's Group of Experts on Action against Violence against Women and Domestic Violence (GREVIO) to adapt its sexual violence legislation to include the notion of "freely given consent."

=== Indigenous rights ===
On 18 January 1996, Denmark ratified the international Indigenous and Tribal Peoples Convention, 1989 (ILO-convention 169) and voted in favour on the adoption of the proposal of the international Declaration on the Rights of Indigenous Peoples on 13 September 2007.

Denmark has one officially recognized indigenous groups: the Inuit - the Greenlandic Inuit of Greenland and the Greenlandic people in Denmark (Inuit residing in Denmark). Despite there being around 70.000 people living and identifying as an Inuk person, there is no official state registry defining the Inuit as Indigenous nor as a distinct people in the Kingdom of Denmark. Greenlandic Inuit are as nationals of Greenland, Citizens of the Realm of Denmark, and also EU citizens due to Greenland's associated relationship with the European Union.

The Inuit are indigenous to the Arctic and have traditionally inhabited Greenland and the northern parts of Canada and Alaska. The Inuit have for decades been the subject of discrimination and abuse by the dominant colonisers from Europe, those countries claiming possession of Inuit lands. The Inuit have never been a single community in a single region of Inuit.

From the 18th century up to the 1970s, the Danish government (Dano-Norwegian until 1814) have through time tried to assimilate the Greenlandic Inuit, encouraging them to adopt the majority language, culture and religion. Denmark has been greatly criticised by the Greenlandic community for the politics of Danization (50's and 60's) of and discrimination against the indigenous population of the country. Critical treatment paying non-Inuit workers higher wages than the local people, the relocation of entire families from their traditional lands into settlements, and separating children from their parents and sending them away to Denmark for schooling has been practiced.

In Denmark, the Greenlandic Inuit have the same rights as everyone else with Danish citizenship, but people with a Greenlandic Inuit background face a number of challenges in relation to enjoying equal treatment and opportunities as to other nationals of the realm. In general, Greenlanders are not considered an ethnic minority, although some experience special linguistic, cultural and social challenges in Danish society in line with citizens with an ethnic minority background.

In Greenland the Inuit still maintain traditional indigenous practices, such as hunting and fishing. The Inuit were subjugated under Danish colonial rule from 1721 up through the twentieth century. In 1953, Greenland became a fully integrated part of the Realm of Denmark as the County of Greenland whereas Denmark implemented a severe policy of modernization through urbanization, relocating the Inuit from their small, subsistence-based communities to major cities. In 1979, Greenland successfully lobbied for autonomy from Denmark and achieved a Home Rule Government, which was expanded to Self-Government in 2009.

Denmark's initial relationship with its Indigenous population reflected typical Western European imperialism.

Until this day Greenlands autonomy is still not protected by the Danish constitution. Greenland is still a stateless nation where its people do not possess their own state, and do not have the majority population within the unitary nation state of the Kingdom of Denmark. The term "stateless" implies that Greenland and its people "should have" such a state (country). In contrast to if the Kingdom of Denmark was a multinational state that comprises Denmark, Greenland and the Faroe Islands as equal nations or states within the Kingdom in a federation, giving their sovereignty to each other.

Greenland is not a member of any State government, Council of State and neither Council of Ministers of the Kingdom, but have achieved limited settlement lobbied by the Greenlandic MPs in the Kingdom Parliament (Folketinget).

=== Racism ===
On 7 February 2022, a Euro-Med Monitor's report revealed that Denmark has racist practices against the areas classified as "Ghetto." The ghetto areas include 29 areas throughout Denmark, and contain poor and weak population areas, the majority of which are residents of non-Western ethnicities and non-White. According to the report, Ghettos are subject to evictions, compulsory custody, double punishment, and excessive security measures. Moreover, the Danish policy practices towards minorities are a clear example of the practice of opportunistic policies, and of presenting minorities as a scapegoat to justify the failure to solve social problems. These policies have spread poverty, unemployment, insecurity and trust in areas of national minorities.

A 2024 report by Amnesty International, Coded Injustice: Surveillance and Discrimination in Denmark's Automated Welfare State, criticizes Denmark's welfare authority, Udbetaling Danmark, for using AI-driven fraud detection systems that risk discriminating against people with disabilities, low-income individuals, migrants, and racial minorities. The report highlights how the use of up to 60 algorithms, including those assessing "foreign affiliation" and "unusual" living patterns, enables mass surveillance and can result in unfair targeting and privacy violations. Amnesty argues that these systems may function as a prohibited "social scoring system" under the EU AI Act and calls for their suspension, greater transparency, and stronger legal safeguards. Danish authorities have rejected Amnesty's findings but have not provided full transparency into the system's design or data use.

=== Rights of LGBTQ people ===
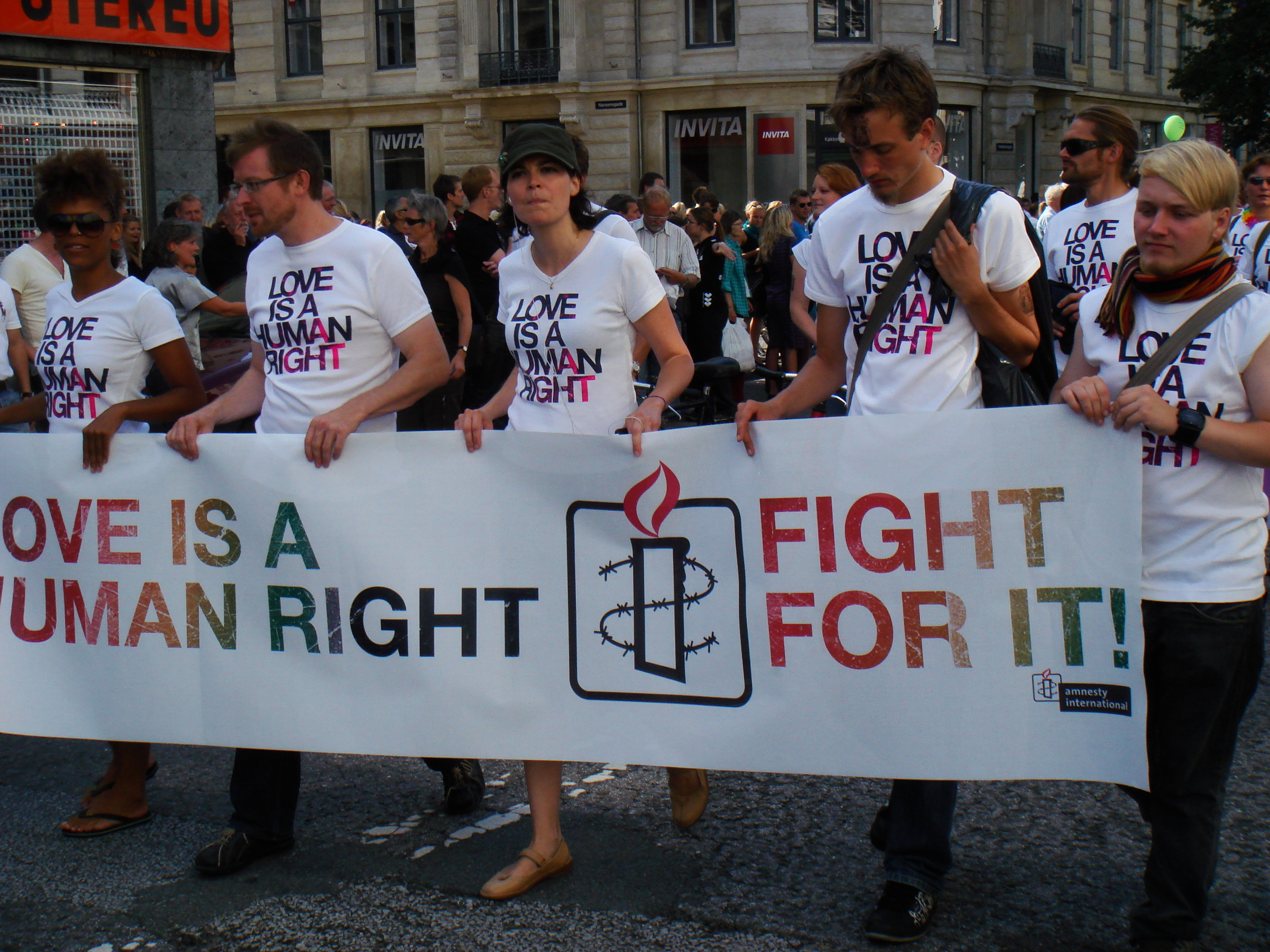
Copenhagen Pride, 2008

Denmark was the first country to recognise registered partnerships (Danish: registreret partnerskab) between same-sex couples, in a law enacted on 7 June 1989. This granted the LGBTQ community many of the same rights as heterosexual couples; however it did not grant them "the right to adopt or obtain joint custody of a child". On 15 June 2012, Denmark became the eleventh country in the world to legalise same-sex marriage, the existing law being replaced by gender-neutral marriage legislation.

In January 2016, a resolution was implemented by the Danish parliament which prevented transgender being classified as a mental health condition. In doing so, Denmark went against the World Health Organization (WHO) standards, which classified gender identity disorder as a mental health issue until June 2018.

Amnesty International's 2017–2018 report on 'The State of the World's Human Rights' states that Denmark's procedural rules surrounding access to transgender hormone therapy and gender-affirming surgery "unreasonably prolong the gender recognition process". In addition, Amnesty International revealed that the Danish Health Authority has not yet established national guidelines outlining how children with variations of sex characteristics should be treated by doctors. As a result, "non-emergency invasive and irreversible medical procedures" may be conducted on children under the age of 10. This directly violates the UN's Convention on the Rights of the Child.

=== Torture and Prisons ===
In May 2025, Denmark was convicted by the European Court of Human Rights for violating the right to life after 23-year-old Ekrem Sahin died in 2011 in Kolding Jail. The inmate was put in a leg lock and restrained on his stomach by several prison officers for almost 20 minutes. The court found that the prison had lacked clear guidelines and proper staff training for using this restraint technique. Sahin lost consciousness and died after three days in a coma. The case was brought by his mother, citing Articles 2 and 3 of the European Human Rights Convention. This marks the first time Denmark has been found guilty of violating the right to life by the court. Domestic courts had previously dropped the case.

In January 2016, a young man in Vridsløselille Prison was subjected to a belt restraint in solitary confinement for nine days. The person was subsequently transferred to Herstedvester Prison, where he died shortly thereafter. The case, kept from public knowledge by the Danish Prison and Probation Service for over two years, raised serious concerns about potential violations of human rights. UN human rights expert Jens Modvig suggested that the prolonged restraint could constitute inhumane treatment or even torture. During the same year, the Danish Institute for Human Rights noted "general concern at the conditions in which detained foreign nationals were held [at Vridsløselille], including lack of information, communication and human contact".

In May 2022, during climate protests organized by Extinction Rebellion in Copenhagen, several demonstrators were subjected to unlawful treatment by the police. Nineteen out of 121 activists who later sued the Copenhagen Police were granted compensation, as the Copenhagen City Court (Københavns Byret) found the long duration of the detentions and strip searches of the activists illegal under Article 3 of the European Convention on Human Rights, as well as Danish police law. The protests, which included road blockades and demonstrations near Slotsholmen and Copenhagen Airport, aimed to criticize Denmark's climate policies.

== See also ==
- Freedom of the press in Denmark
