= Riihimäki Prison =

Prison in Riihimäki, Finland

Coordinates: 60.7639°N 24.7870°E

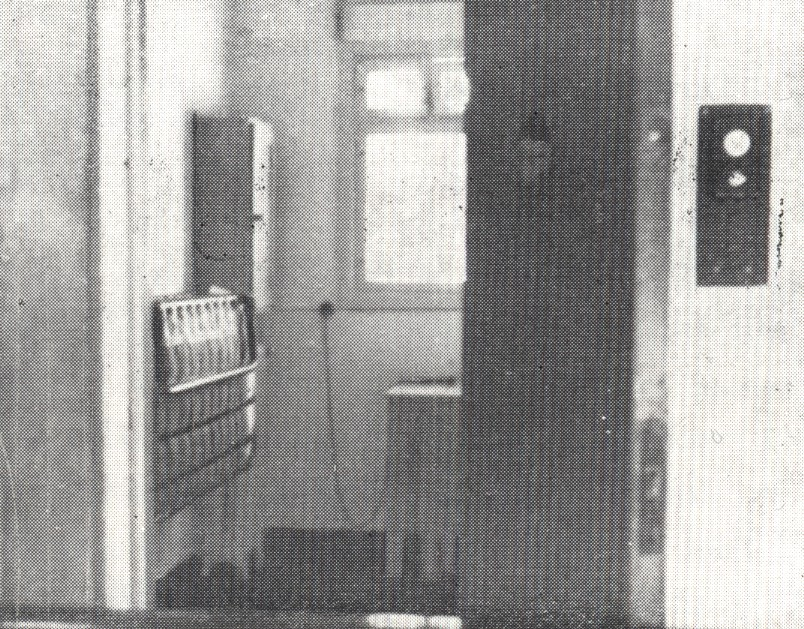
A cell in Riihimäki Prison, 1944

Riihimäki Prison (Finnish: Riihimäen vankila) is the main correctional facility in southern Finland, located in Riihimäki. It is a closed prison, with capacity for 223 inmates. Along with Turku, Riihimäki is one of two prisons in Finland with the highest A+ security rating, making it home to the country's most dangerous prisoners. It houses prisoners mainly from southern Finland, as well as comprising three national specialist units, including one for sexual offenders.
