= Law enforcement in Greenland =

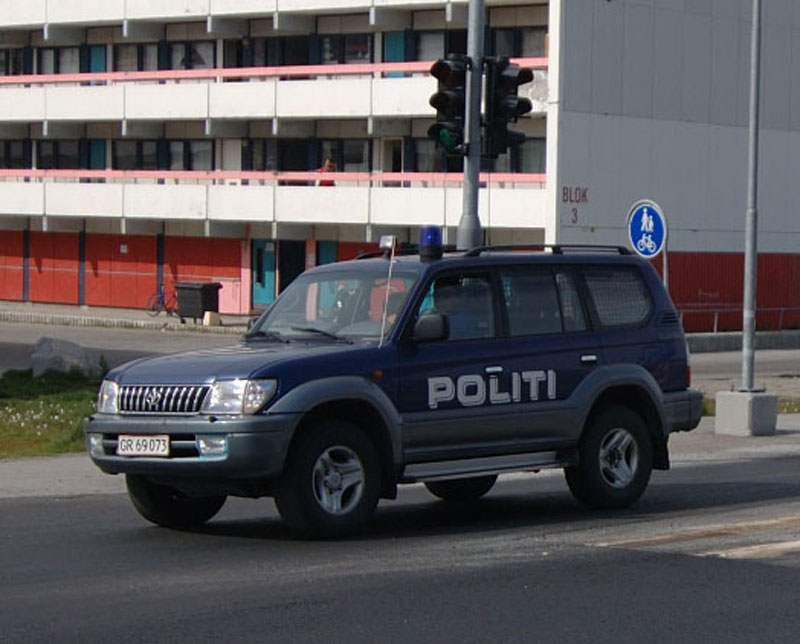
Greenland Police SUV in Nuuk.

Law enforcement in Greenland, an autonomous territory of the Kingdom of Denmark, is provided by Kalaallit Nunaanni Politiit (English: Greenland Police, Danish: Grønlands Politi) an independent police district of Naalagaaffiup Politiivi (English: The National Police of Denmark, Danish: Rigspolitiet), within the National Police of Denmark. Since 2006, Greenland has constituted one of the 12 police districts of the Rigspolitiet, headed by the chief constable known as the Politiit Pisortaat based in Nuuk, the capital of Greenland.

The Greenlandic police and prison system are de facto locally run, but formally under the Danish State. As part of the 2009 self-governing agreement, Greenland is able to assume full local control of policing, but the Greenlandic parliament has not enacted legislation to do so; as a result the pre-2009 framework remains in place.

== Crime ==
The sale of hard liquor, which became legal in the 1950s, has led to violence connected to alcohol abuse. In some towns, the sale of hard liquor was once rationed as a preventative measure. Other issues such as domestic violence and substance abuse are also pressing problems in Greenland.

Most large towns of populations upwards of 1,000 and some smaller ones have a police presence with a contact number to keep on good relations with locals and tourists.

== Prison system ==
In the Inuit society, punishment for crimes traditionally was relatively lenient, as everybody was needed to survive in the harsh, isolated environment of Greenland. As an extension of this, most of the Greenlandic prison system runs on a uniquely open model. Inmates that are part of the open system must report to prison between 9:30 p.m. and 6:30 a.m. each day, but may go to work, visit relatives and complete errands while in the community. They also may hunt with firearms if they are escorted by a prison guard. Prisoners have keys to their own cells, as this is regarded as a form of privacy. A failure to attend prison will result in 7 days in solitary confinement once the escapee returns. Prisoners are also subjected to drug testing, and a failed drug test will result in solitary confinement. Because of the geographic isolation of Greenland's towns and overall small population ("everybody knows everybody"), escapes from the open facilities are very rare.

Greenlandic prisoners considered too high risk for the open system or requiring a high level of supervision used to all be sent to Denmark's Herstedvester, a prison which also has the capacity to provide psychiatric care. Since this system was implemented in the 1950s, slightly more than 100 Greenlandic prisoners have been in Herstedvester, and in 2018 there were 27. In 2019, Greenland's first fully closed prison became operational in the capital of Nuuk, reducing the need for sending some prisoners to Denmark. The new prison, which is able to house up to 76 inmates, in an open and a closed group, enables inmates to cook for themselves, to keep in touch with their families via provided cell phones and encourages outdoor-activities. Greenlandic prisoners already in Herstedvester were given the possibility of being transferred to the new prison in Nuuk. A large proportion have wished to serve their sentence in Denmark instead of Nuuk, typically because they want to stay in Denmark when released, feel no more connected to the Greenlandic capital than to Denmark (there are significant cultural differences between different Greenlandic regions and some inmates originate from places very far from Nuuk), or they want access to specialized treatment resources that are not available at the relatively small Greenlandic facility. Shortly after its completion, British broadcast journalist Raphael Rowe visited the new Nuuk prison for an episode of his documentary Inside the World's Toughest Prisons, where it was noted that it was very different from other prisons he had visited, with the facilities being quite comfortable for the inmates, them having a relatively high level of freedom within it and the overall strong focus on rehabilitation.

== See also ==
- Rigspolitiet - National police of Denmark
- Politiet - State police of Denmark
