= Marcel Hansen =

Marcel Hansen could refer to:

- Marcel Hansen (gymnast), a Danish gymnast
- Marcel Hansen (criminal), a Danish murderer
