= Horsens Statsfængsel =

Prison museum in Horsens, Denmark

Horsens State Prison Horsens Prison Museum
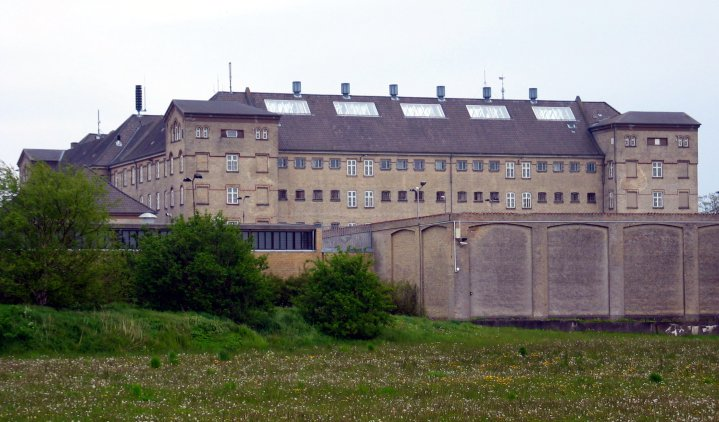
- Horsens Statsfængsel in 2005
- Interactive map of Horsens State Prison; Horsens Prison Museum
- Location: Horsens, Region Midtjylland, Denmark; 55°52′26″N 9°50′11″E
- Opened: 1853 (prison); 2012 (museum)
- Closed: 2006 (prison)
- Website: Official website

Horsens Statsfængsel (Horsens State Prison), formerly called Horsens Straffeanstalt (Horsens Correctional Institution), is a former prison in Horsens, Denmark. Today it is a crime and prison museum called Horsens Prison Museum (Fængselsmuseet), a conference and business facility, and a concert venue where bands such as Metallica have played. Following expansions in 2016, it is the largest prison museum in the world. It won the 2015 InAVation award as best visitors attraction and the 2016 Museums + Heritage award as best foreign (non-British) museum..In 2014 it was also proposed as the venue for hosting Eurovision-2014, which was held in Denmark.

The prison was commissioned in 1853 and was closed in 2006 when the last remaining inmates were moved to the State Prison of East Jutland at Enner Mark, west of Horsens. When built, the prison was intended for prisoners serving long prison sentences. The prisoners spend the nights in their cells, during the day prisoners worked in the prison's "workshops" and during the evenings, they moved freely in the wards.

Among the famous prisoners were Carl August Lorentzen (1896-1958) who escaped in 1949 through a 20 m (66 ft) tunnel he initially dug with a spoon, politician Peter Adler Alberti who gained notoriety due to an embezzlement scandal in 1908, Jens Nielsen (1884-1892) who was executed in 1892 (the last person to be executed in Danish peacetime), and German Nazi Werner Best who was the administrator of Denmark during the World War II occupation. Artifacts relating to Lorentzen's escape, Alberti's and Best's imprisonments, and the axe used in Nielsen's execution are among the items at the museum.
