= State Prison in Ringe =

Prison near Ringe, Denmark

Coordinates: 55°13′21″N 10°28′56″E

- Interactive map of State Prison in Ringe
- Location: Ringe, Region of Southern Denmark, Denmark.
- Status: Operational
- Capacity: 141
- Opened: 1976
- Managed by: The Danish Prison and Probation Service
- Warden: Lars Skjødt Vinther

Ringe Prison (Danish: Ringe Fængsel), also known as the State Prison in Ringe (Danish: Statsfængslet i Ringe), was built in 1976 and is a closed prison near the town of Ringe in the country of Denmark. The prison's seven departments previously had a total capacity of 86 and receives both men and women from across the country from the age of 23 years to the age 29 years who must endure punishment in a closed prison.

State Prison in Ringe is also the only closed prison in Denmark, which has a large outdoor area for each department, which prisoners are free to use whenever they want. The male inmates are mostly convicted for violence and robbery, while the female inmates are often convicted of drug trafficking.

The prison was expanded in 2025 to house 141 inmates.
