= Turku Prison =

Prison in Turku, Finland

Coordinates: 60.4430°N 22.2431°E

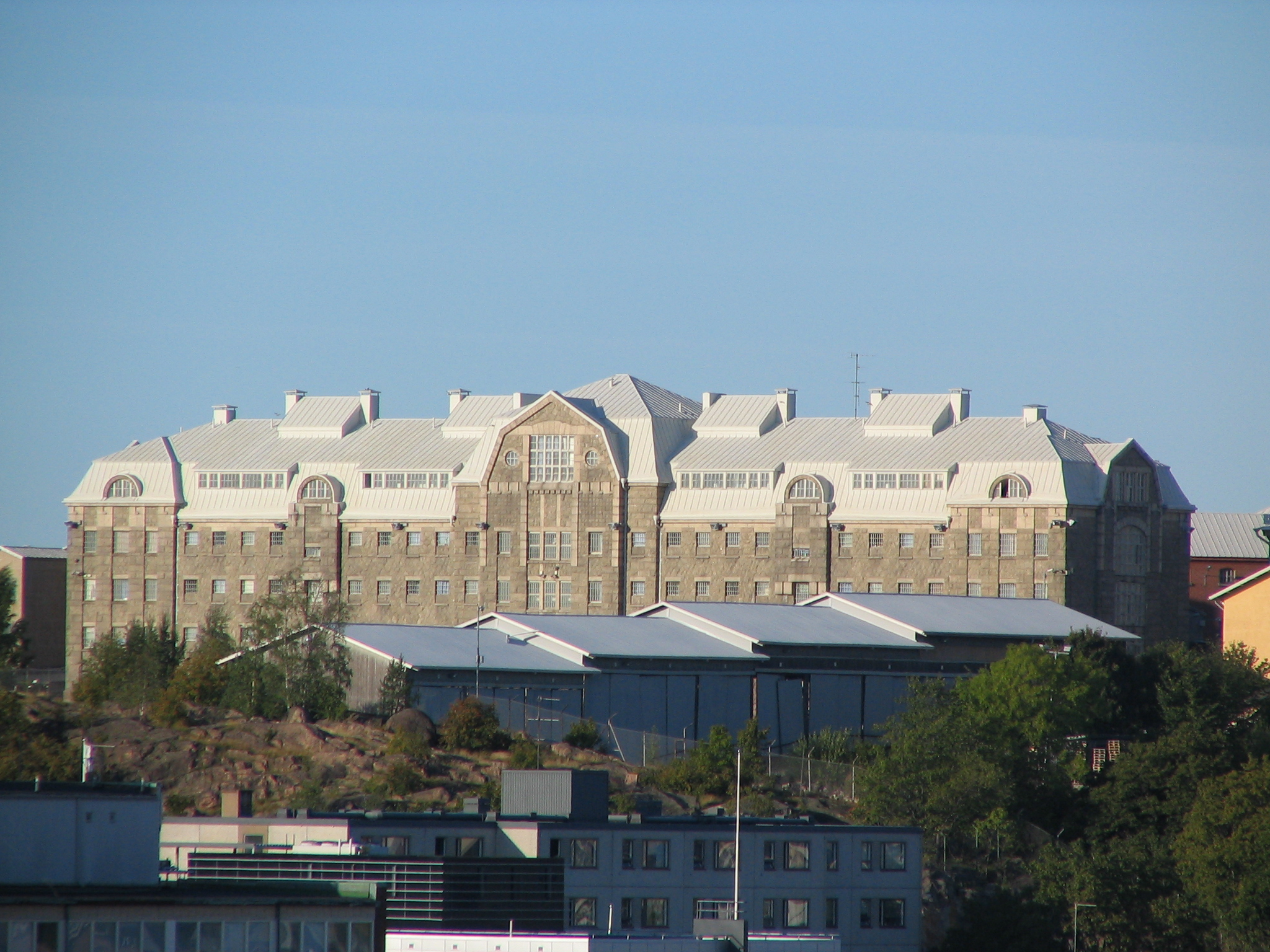
Turku Central Prison - “Kakola”

Turku Prison (Finnish: Turun vankila, Swedish: Åbo fängelse) is the main correctional facility in southwestern Finland, located in the Saramäki district of Turku. It was formed in 2003 by the merger of the earlier Turku Central Prison (Turun keskusvankila), also commonly known as 'Kakola', and Turku County Prison (Turun lääninvankila), and moved in 2007 from its old location on the Kakolanmäki hill in central Turku to its new premises. It is a closed prison, with capacity for 255 inmates. Along with Riihimäki, Turku is one of two prisons in Finland with the highest A+ security rating. In 2021, a new high security wing was added, to house prisoners associated with organised crime or otherwise likely to pose particular risks.
