= Marcel Hansen (criminal) =

Danish serial rapist and murderer

Marcel Lychau Hansen (born October 2, 1965), better known as the Amager Man (Danish: Amagermanden), is a Danish serial rapist and convicted murderer who was sentenced to life imprisonment for two murders by a jury in the Copenhagen City Court on December 22, 2011. Hansen has also been convicted of six rapes, one of them being a quadruple rape, committed from February 16, 1987, to September 25, 2010.

Hansen was born on October 2, 1965, growing up at Tilburg Allé in Dragør, on the island of Amager. He attended the Skelgårdsskolen in Tårnby, and later had a family in Kastrup in 1988 with a young girlfriend. They never married, and separated after nearly 20 years of cohabitation in 2007. The couple has two sons.

== Past employment ==
In the 1980s, Marcel Hansen worked in the furniture moving business for the company 3x34, and until his arrest, for approximately 12 years he worked as a janitor for the Scandinavian Airlines at Copenhagen Airport. In addition, he was an active football player in the Sundby Ball Club, and was an active football coach for FC Amager and lastly AB Tårnby, from where he resigned a day prior to his arrest.

== Murders ==
=== Edith Andrup ===
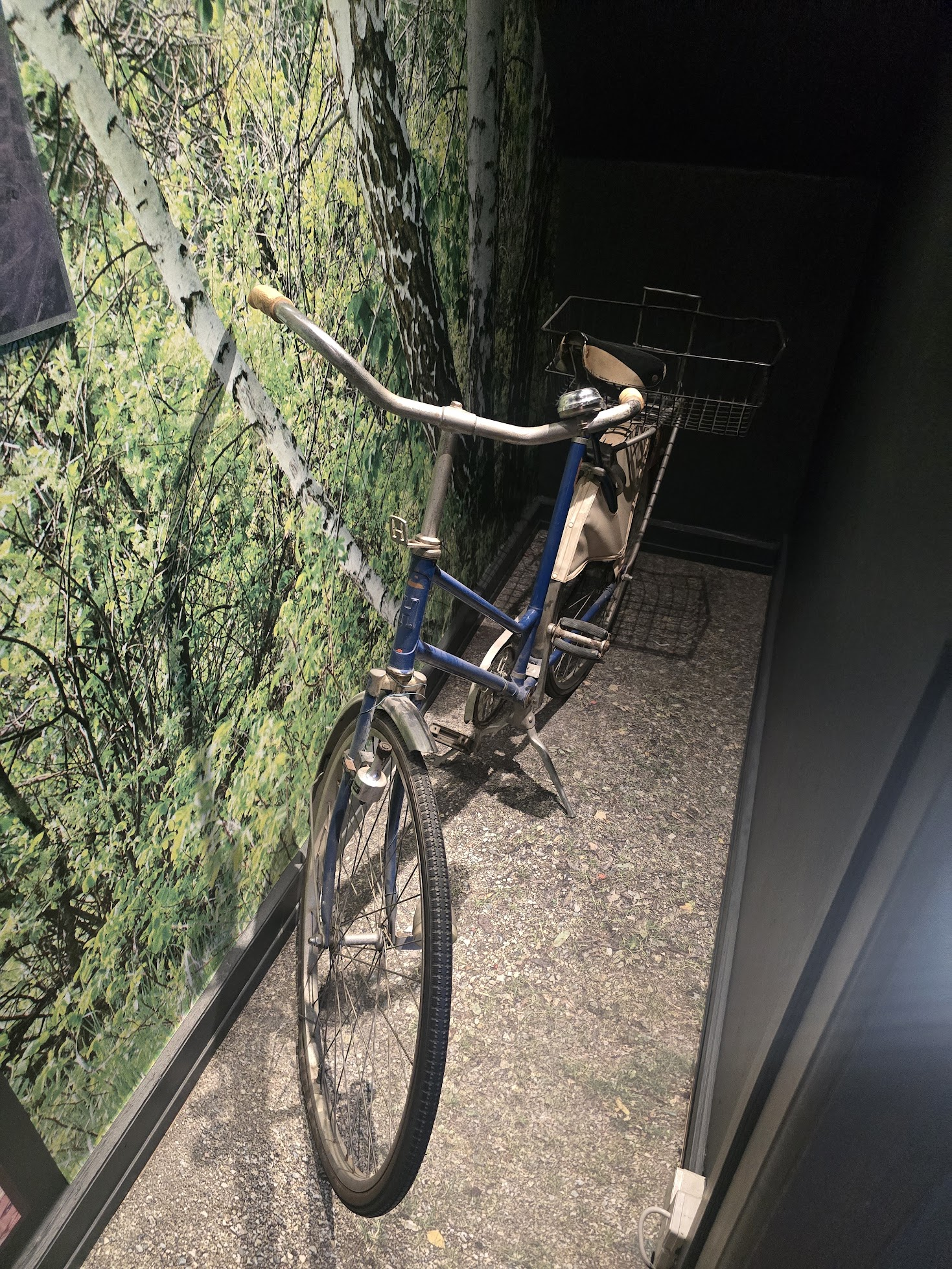
The bicyle of Lene Buchardt Rasmussen, exhibited at the Danish Police Museum in Copenhagen.

On February 16, 1987, Hansen broke into the Valby apartment of 73-year-old widow Edith Louise Andrup. He knocked her out using ether, before proceeding to strangle her with his bare hands. After the murder, he stole her jewelry and money, leaving behind a lit candle as well as four open gas taps in the kitchen, in an attempt to blow up the apartment. Marcel Lychau Hansen was employed to help her move furniture about a month before her killing. He was questioned several times by police in 1987, but only charged with her murder in 2010. At the Copenhagen City Court on December 22, 2011, he was convicted of the murder, and also of attempted arson that could endanger other people's lives.

=== Lene Rasmussen ===
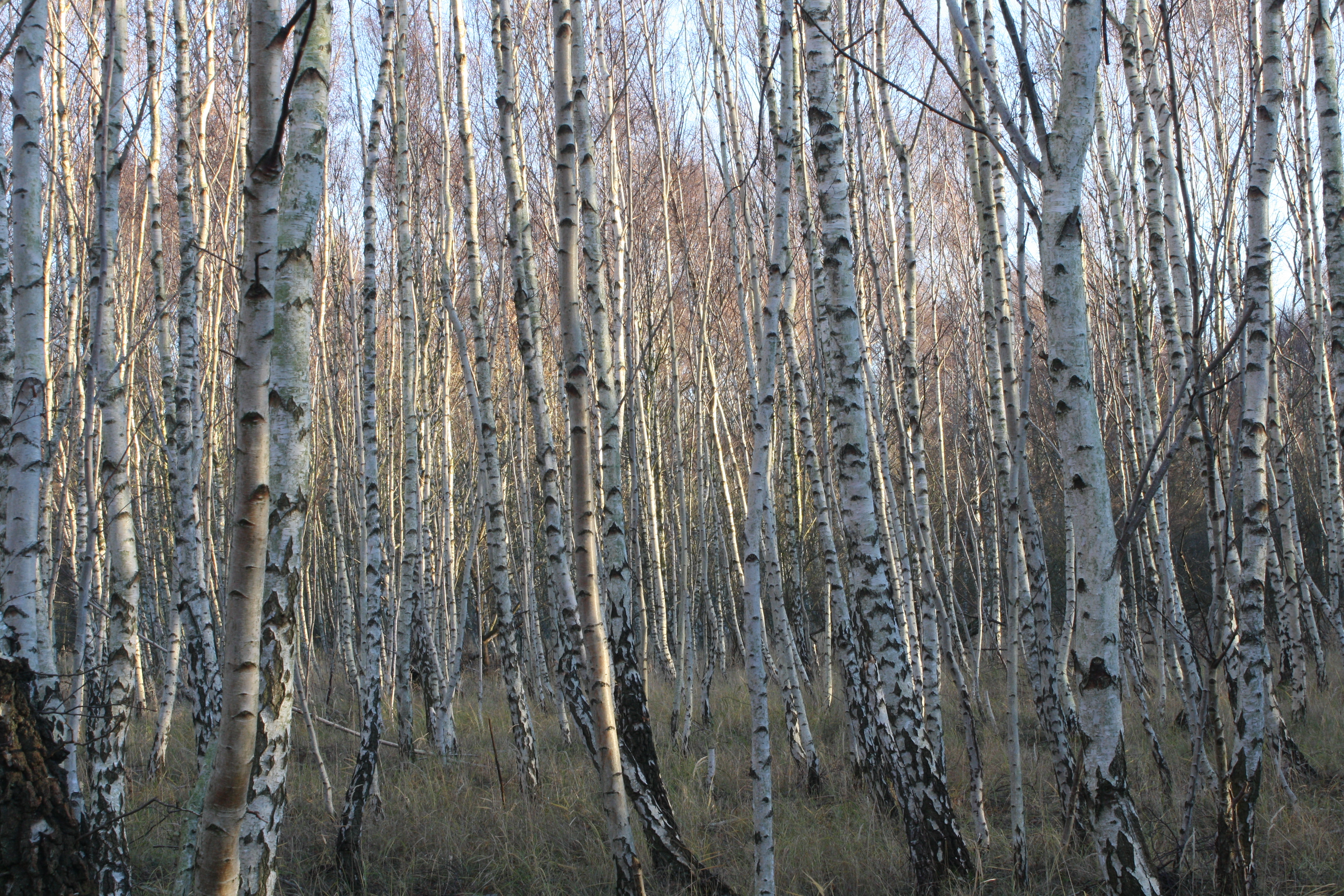
Here you can see the Kalvebod Fælled, which, like the Fasanskoven only a few kilometers away, is a densely populated birch forest.

On August 29, 1990, the 40-year-old schoolteacher Lene Buchardt Rasmussen was riding home to her apartment in Peter Sabroesgade, in Copenhagen's southwest quarter. She had brought a pair of binoculars, as she wanted to study birds at the Kalvebod Fælled. But when she did not return home that evening, her husband notified police. The following day, a police search was initiated, aided by helicopters and cadaver dogs. On September 3, the police helicopter found her bicycle, left by a tree in Fasanskoven, and later that day, Rasmussen's body was found. She had been raped and subsequently strangled, with her killer having stolen her silver ring and watch, probably as trophies. The case had stalled for a long time, as DNA evidence from semen found on the victim couldn't be matched to a perpetrator. On November 1, 2010, police reported that the man who had murdered Lene Rasmussen is the same person who committed two rapes in 2005 and 2010, as the DNA from the three crime scenes matched. At the Copenhagen City Court on December 22, 2011, Hansen was convicted of this murder.

== Rapes ==
Marcel Lychau Hansen was additionally indicted for seven rapes.

=== 1995 quadruple rape ===
On October 19, 1995, he broke into a villa in Amager, where he raped two 14-year-old girls, another 15-year-old and a 23-year-old woman. After the rapes, he stole silver and jewelry, worth about 65,000 kroner at the time. He also stole a Dankort card, from which he withdrew 2,000 kroner at various ATMs in the area. Some of the jewelry was later found to be in possession of Hansen's elder son, during a December 2011 search and seizure.

=== 2005 college rape ===
On May 3, 2005, he broke into a dorm room at the Amager College near Ørestad, where he raped a 24-year-old woman for two hours, forcing the victim to wear a blindfold under the threat of a knife. He had also drank milk from the woman's refrigerator. Lychau Hansen was indicted for the rape after DNA traces were found on the milk carton, as well as handprints on the right doorlock of the victim's bathroom door.

=== 2007 rape ===
On July 22, 2007, a 47-year-old woman was pulled into a green area at the Vangede Church, near Gentofte, during which Hansen took off her belt and wrapped it around her neck, while forcing her into oral sex. During the assault, he continuously strangled her with the belt. Lychau Hansen was charged with the rape, but due to a lack of DNA evidence and material, he was acquitted of this charge by the Copenhagen City Court.

=== 2010 allotment garden rape ===
On September 25, 2010, a 17-year-old was threatened with a knife, assaulted and raped orally at an allotment garden in Amager. While fleeing the scene, the perpetrator dropped a condom a few meters from the victim. Police later found that the DNA was identical to the one found on the milk carton in the 2005 rape, as well as that on the Lene Rasmussen's body in 1990.

== Prosecution ==
=== Arrest ===
Marcel Hansen was arrested on November 12, 2010, at 3:23 PM at his Valby residence, charged with the two rapes and the Rasmussen murder. The next day, he was given a constitutional hearing in the Copenhagen City Court, where he remanded in custody until December 8. Hansen was transferred to Vestre Prison, where he put in solitary confinement. Subsequently, his stay was extended after he was charged with the other murder and six more rapes.

On the day of his arrest, Marcel's home was thoroughly searched, with police finding a package of "Thin" brand condoms, manufactured by the Swedish company RFSU. The same brand was on the condom found at the 2010 rape.

=== Trial ===
Marcel Lychau Hansen's trial began in the Copenhagen City Court on November 2, 2011, lasting until December 22nd. He pled not guilty to all charges. The prosecutor demanded life imprisonment, while the defendant asked for a suspended sentence. Hansen was convicted of the two killings and six rapes on December 19, as well as attempted arson. Three days later, a sentence was announced - life imprisonment, which Hansen did not appeal.

=== Prison ===
Marcel Hansen remained in Vestre Prison for some time, before being transferred to Herstedvester Prison in June 2012, but on July 23 of that year, he was forcefully moved to the State Prison of East Jutland. The reason for this was the belief that he would escape, and his refusal of some of the prison's offers, such as therapy, psychologists and psychiatric assistance.

=== 'Semen plan' ===
On December 15, 2011, it became known to police that Hansen had smuggled letters with his own semen from Vestre Prison, where he was being held in custody. His son's girlfriend delivered four letters, as well as a clipped tip from a rubber glove with the son's own semen, to the Northwest Zealand Police in Frederikssund. Marcel had sent a total of eight letters to his son with semen, salive and hair wrapped in rubber nappies, instructing the son to assault a random woman and put the delivered material on the body. That way, the police would find his DNA, while he was in prison. According to him, this would apparently prove that there was another person with the corresponding DNA to his own, making his sentence invalid. In one of the letters, he had written the following instructions: "Do not kill anyone for me, at most knock someone out and plant the DNA".

The Hansens were both charged, but the authorities subsequently abandoned the charges in court. Marcel admitted that the DNA was his, and he was convicted of complicity to commit rape. He was not given an additional sentence, as he is already serving the highest possible sentence in Danish law, but the ruling may become relevant if he is ever to be put on parole. Hansen did not appeal the verdict.

== Bibliography ==
- The case of the Amager Man - The hunt for a serial offender (ed.: Claus Buhr and Vicki Therkildsen – Gyldendal (2012). ISBN 87-02-13018-1
