= Life imprisonment in Denmark =

In Denmark, a life sentence (Danish: Livsvarigt fængsel) is the most severe punishment available under the Penal Code, and is reserved for the most serious crimes. The sentence is of indeterminate length. Those under a life sentence in Denmark can request a pardon hearing after 12 years. If the petition is granted, the Justice Minister or his designee issues a pardon, subject to a parole period of up to 5 years.

Prisoners sentenced to life imprisonment serve an average of 17 years. A person with a life sentence will not be released if it is considered likely that he/she will recidivate. This means some offenders have served a considerably longer time than the average. In recent times, there have been four convicts who have served greater than 30 years: Naum Conevski (34 years as of 2018, still incarcerated in the closed unit of Sankt Hans Hospital), Palle Sørensen (33 years, released in 1998), Seth Sethsen (32 years as of 2018, still incarcerated) and William Brorson (32 years, released in 1978).

Murderers may receive a life sentence, but such a sentence is handed down only when the person has a previous history of committing serious crimes, or if a murder is considered particularly horrendous. Otherwise, a murderer will typically receive a time-limited sentence, which can be up to 20 years in Denmark. In recent times, all receiving a life sentence have been murderers; however, a person who commits treason, uses force against the Danish Parliament, commits espionage during wartime, engages in terrorism, commits arson under circumstances that are life-threatening, hijacks a vehicle under aggravated circumstances, or willfully releases nuclear substances is eligible for a life sentence.

On average, slightly more than one person receives a life sentence each year in Denmark (14 from 2006 to 2018), and in 2015 there were a total of 21 people serving life.

== "Custody sentence" and "placement sentence" ==
Criminals considered dangerous may receive a "custody sentence" (Danish: forvaringsdom) instead of a life sentence. This can also be handed down for certain crimes where a life sentence is not possible, such as rape and aggravated robbery. It is often used for people with deviant personalities (for example, antisocial personality disorder), and is typically served in the Herstedvester Prison. It differs from a "placement sentence" (Danish: anbringelsesdom), which is reserved for mentally ill people who are ineligible for a normal prison sentence. These inmates serve their sentence in the closed unit of a psychiatric hospital. A custody sentence always lacks a time limit, and a placement sentence often does, but both are subject to periodic pardon hearings. A review covering 1990–2011 showed that, on average, a person with a custody sentence was released after 14 years and 7 months.

== Minors ==
A person 15 to 18 years old at the time of their crime can not receive a life sentence, but is eligible for all other penalties in the Penal Code. Until 2010, these persons' maximum sentence was 8 years, or consisted of a "custody sentence". A person under the age of 15 is below the age of accountability, and cannot receive a prison sentence.

== See also ==
- Capital punishment in Denmark, abolished in 1930 but briefly restored for a period after World War II
