= Capital punishment in Denmark =

Europe holds the greatest concentration of abolitionist states (blue). Map current as of 2022 Abolished for all offences Abolished in practice Retains capital punishment

Capital punishment in Denmark (Danish: Dødsstraf - "death penalty") was abolished in 1933 (except for military law), with no death sentences having been carried out since 1892, but restored from 1945 to 1950 in order to execute Nazi collaborators. Capital punishment for most instances of war crimes was abolished in 1978 (and in all cases since 1 January 1994). The last execution was carried out in June 1950.

Currently reinstitution of capital punishment is not supported by any political party in Parliament. According to an opinion poll from 2006, one fifth of Danes supported capital punishment for certain crimes. The number was unchanged since another poll in 1999.

== History to 1945 ==
For the most part, Denmark followed the style of other European nations, with government-employed executioners, called skarpretter (headsman) in Denmark. The headsman had the status of a Royal government employee.

In 1751, the last known execution for bestiality in Denmark happened.

The last public execution was in Lolland of Anders "Sjællænder" Nielsen, by decapitation in 1882. The spectacle generated called for the abolishment of the death penalty, particularly since the headsman, Theodor Seistrup, had to swing his axe several times in order to complete the job.

The last execution prior to 1946 was on 8 November 1892, in the courtyard of the State Prison of Horsens. Jens Nielsen, sentenced to a long prison term for arson, allegedly wished to commit suicide by provoking his execution and accordingly made three attempts to murder a guard over the years. His decapitation by Seistrup's axe followed the third attempt.

The last headsman in office was Carl Christensen who held the position from 27 August 1906 until 1 April 1926, but never performed any executions.

Starting during the first decade of the 1800s, death penalties were increasingly commuted to life imprisonment by the Crown. After 1892, death sentences were handed down but not carried out. This also applied to the last death sentence prior to 1945 which was handed down in a civil court on 13 June 1928.

On 15 April 1930, Denmark legislated for a new Danish Penal Code, to replace the older code from 10 February 1866. When the new code came into force on 1 January 1933, capital punishment was abolished except for capital punishment under military law.

== 1945–1950 ==
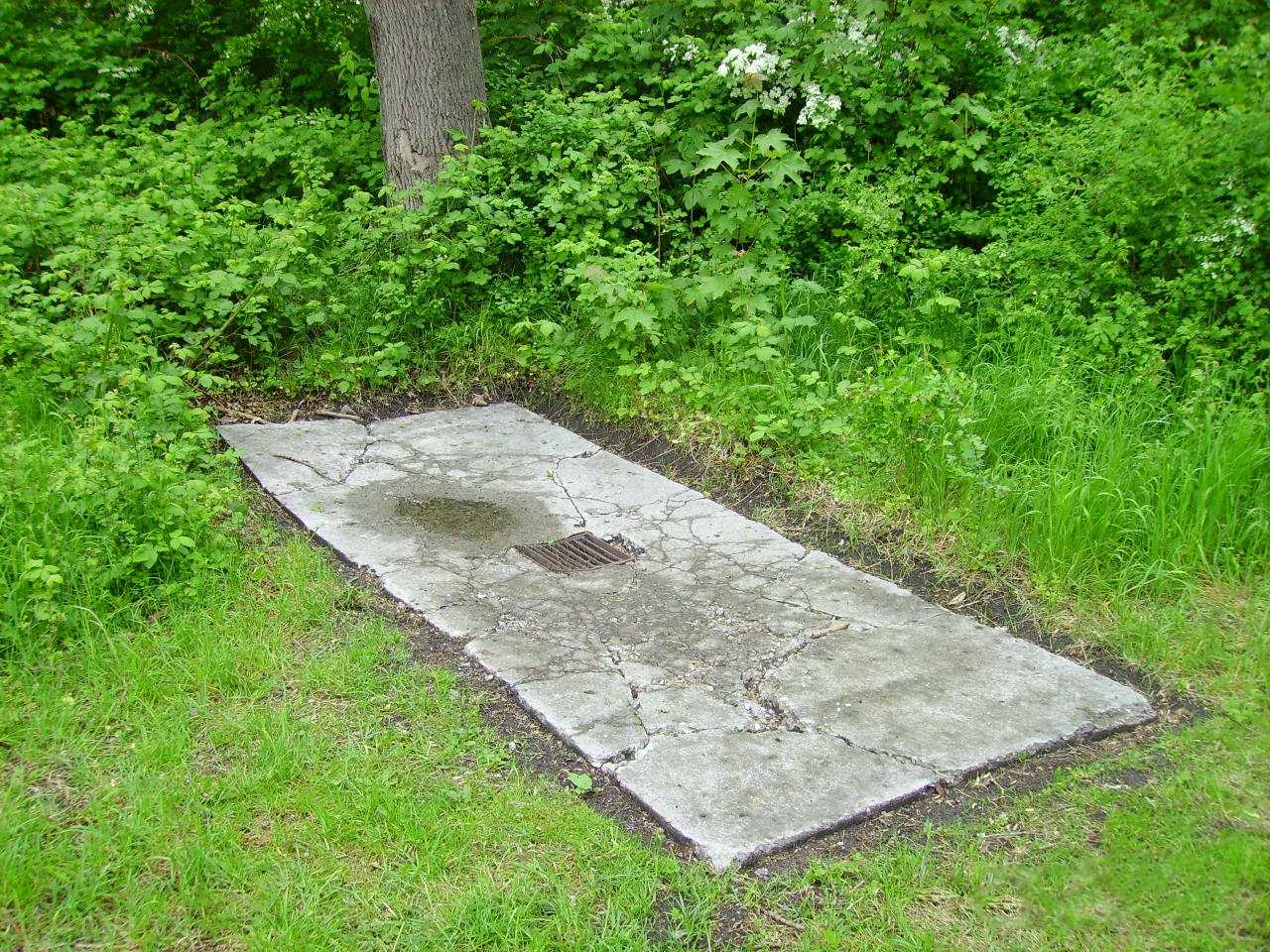
Remnants of the Christianshavn execution shed used from 1946 to 1950

Between 1945 and 1947, three special laws were enacted to bring capital punishment back into the penal code, to address crimes committed during the occupation of Denmark. These were ex post facto laws and were part of the purges (Danish: Retsopgøret) attempting to meet public opinion demanding severe punishment for wartime offenders, in particular certain informants and those HIPO and Gestapo officers responsible for brutal murders or torture.

About 13,500 people were sentenced as collaborators, denouncers or traitors under these laws. About 400 were killed, mostly in extralegal reprisals, with 76 formally sentenced to death and 46 of the capital sentences carried out. The 30 remaining were pardoned. The sentences were carried out by firing squads of 10 voluntary police officers, either in Undallslund Plantage (17), close to Viborg or on the military training grounds at Margreteholm, Christianshavn, Copenhagen (29). The latter execution area is today inside Christiania, on the Second Redan of the outer rampart, Enveloppen (in Christiania called Aircondition, Dyssen area) where a concrete floor and drain can still be seen at coordinates 55.679871°N 12.61363°E. (See: Freetown Christiania#Barracks and ramparts)

The last person to be executed in Denmark was Ib Birkedal Hansen, shot by firing squad on 20 July 1950.

=== Political background to the post-World War II purges ===
In 1943, the clandestine Danish Freedom Council first issued their thoughts about Denmark's return to democracy after the war. Among their demands was prosecution of war criminals and of those responsible for the violation of Denmark's legal system and independence. They endorsed retroactive legislation but were then opposed to the death penalty.

Shortly before the German surrender, however, the Freedom Council worked with a clandestine committee of lawyers to elaborate a proposal for a war crimes Act that included the death penalty. The Prime Minister appointed another committee, consisting of civil servants and judges. These two proposals were merged in a subsequent bill. A major point of difference was whether the law would be retroactive to only 29 August 1943, when the Danish government resigned, or all the way back to 9 April 1940 when the occupation had begun. The resistance movement got its way and the latter was decided.

The first penal code appendix bill came before Parliament from 26 to 30 May 1945, just three weeks after the liberation on 5 May. 127 members of the Folketing voted for the law, 5 members of the Justice Party abstained because of opposition to the death penalty, and 19 were absent. On 31 May it was confirmed by the Landsting by 67 votes for, 1 against and 8 were absent. Among the opponents were J.K. Jensen of the Radical Liberal Party and Oluf Pedersen of the Justice Party. Pedersen proposed an amendment which would postpone any executions until a referendum had confirmed the new law. Subsequently, he received threats from former resistance fighters. The only politician who actually ventured to cast a 'no' vote was Ingeborg Hansen, speaker of the Landsting.

K.K. Steincke of the Social Democrats, himself a lawyer, expressed the general viewpoint in this way:

If anyone in 1939 had claimed that in six years from then I would be endorsing a bill about the death penalty, with retroactive force no less, I would not have regarded him as sane. But since then, barbary and lawlessness have occurred, the normal state of law has been violated deeply, and I feel then more tied to a deeply violated public conscience than to normal conditions. We must deal with these criminals, not of a lust for revenge, but so that we soon may return to normal conditions.

The purge after World War II has been widely debated, partially because small offences were sentenced quicker and generally more severely than trials for greater offences which lasted longer, while moods were cooling down after the end of the war. Another point of critique was the retroactivity of the law. Contrarily, proponents in the 1945 debate argued that if the death penalty was not re-applied, war criminals would be subject to mob justice or lynchings. According to a 1945 opinion poll, about 90 percent of the population were in favour of a death penalty for certain war criminals.

The background been documented in depth by historian Ditlev Tamm.

== After 1950 ==
In 1952, the post-war penal code provisions were amended in order to avoid again amending the law on a retroactive basis should Denmark again come under foreign occupation. The amendments reserved capital punishment for crimes committed with particular malice during wartime (murder, treason and denunciation, limited to offenders over the age of 21). This legal basis for civil executions was abolished in 1978 and capital punishment was abolished in military law at the same time. There were no capital sentences after 1950. Capital punishment was still mentioned in the preamble of the law text, however, a new amendment confirming the removal of the death penalty from all Danish law was approved in Parliament on 22 December 1993, effective from 1 January 1994. Subsequent polls have shown varying levels of support for reintroducing capital punishment, generally amounting to one fifth or one fourth of the population. No major political actors support the reintroduction of capital punishment.
