= Seth Sethsen =

Danish-Greenlandic murderer (born 1955)

- Born: Helge Seth Nielsen; 26 May 1955 (age 71); Albertslund, Denmark
- Conviction: Murder
- Penalty: Life imprisonment

Seth Sethsen (born 26 May 1955 as Helge Seth Nielsen) is a Danish-Greenlandic murderer, who was sentenced to life imprisonment in 1986 by the Østre Landsret for the murder of 49-year-old taxi driver Kurt Gaarn-Larsen on 19 October 1985 on Gamle Landevej in Albertslund.
