= Ib Birkedal Hansen =

Executed Danish Nazi colloborator

Niels Rasmus Ib Birkedal Hansen
- Born: October 17, 1909; Århus, Denmark
- Died: July 20, 1950 (aged 40); Christianshavn, Denmark
- Cause of death: Execution by firing squad
- Spouse: Mette Kirstine Nielsine (m. 1934)
- Children: 1
- Military career
- Allegiance: Germany
- Branch: Wehrmacht
- Service years: 1940-1945
- Unit: Birkedal Group (Gestapo)

Niels Rasmus Ib Birkedal Hansen (17 October 1909 – 20 July 1950) was a high-ranking Danish Nazi who acted as a chief in the Gestapo during the Second World War. Notorious for his interrogation techniques, which involved torture and murder, he became a feared and reviled figure among members of the Danish resistance movement.

Hansen was born on 17 October 1909 in Århus, the only child of wholesaler Johannes Frederik Birkedal Hansen and his wife Anna Asta Eliesa. After graduating from high school in 1924, he worked as a sailor for some time before trying his hand at a number of professions, most of which ended in failure. On his 25th birthday, he married Mette Kirstine Nielsine in Åby Parish, with whom he had a daughter the following year. In 1939, he was given a three months' suspended sentence on a fraud conviction.

In the summer of 1940, Hansen left for Germany to look for work. He eventually began working for the Gestapo in Hamburg, remaining there until 1943, whereupon he returned to Denmark and settled in Copenhagen, where he became an interpreter for the local Gestapo branch. He quickly rose through the ranks and eventually had a permanent group of employees serving under him, named The Birkedal Group (Danish: Birkedalgruppen), whose main task was to hunt down, interrogate and subsequently kill members of the Danish resistance. During interrogations, Hansen made systematic and violent use of torture, which, coupled with the group's efficiency and brutality, made him notorious among the population. After the war, it was estimated that the Birkedal Group was involved in about 60% of arrests of Danish resistance fighters.

After liberation, Hansen was sought throughout Europe and eventually apprehended in Germany in 1947, the last of the Birkedal Group who was still on the run. For their crimes, most of the members were either sentenced to death or given long prison terms. During his trial, Hansen tried to plead insanity, and during observations at the infirmary at Vestre Prison, his actions grew increasingly peculiar. Eventually, most came to agree that he was indeed insane, but it was noted that his insanity was not long-lasting and it was suggested that his acts had brought on his cognitive imbalances. And so, disregarding these mitigating circumstances, Hansen was found sane and sentenced to death for war crimes (28 counts of murder and 133 counts of aggravated assault).

On 20 July 1950, Hansen was executed via firing squad at the execution court in Christianshavn, the last person to be executed in Denmark for either civilian or military crimes.

== See also ==
- Capital punishment in Denmark
- List of most recent executions by jurisdiction

== Literature ==
- Øvig Knudsen, Peter (August 11, 2019). Birkedal (in Danish). Gyldendal. ISBN 9788702291834.
