= Palle Sørensen =

Danish murderer (1927–2018)

- Born: 26 March 1927; Copenhagen, Denmark
- Died: 1 February 2018 (aged 90); Valby, Copenhagen, Denmark
- Occupation: Burglar
- Known for: Murdering four policemen
- Status: Deceased
- Motive: Escaping arrest
- Conviction: Murder (4 counts)
- Penalty: Life imprisonment (served 32 years, 8 months)
- Accomplice: Norman Lee Bune
- Time at large: Two days

Details
- Victims: Four: Elmer Gert Jeppesen, 24; Aksel Dybdahl Andersen, 28; Gert Søndergaard Harkjær, 24; Henning Skov Hansen, 24
- Date: 17 September 1965
- Country: Denmark
- Weapon: Browning P-35
- Date apprehended: 20 September 1965

Palle Mogens Fogde Sørensen (26 March 1927 – 1 February 2018) was a Danish convicted mass murderer who, in 1965, shot and killed four police officers. The police officers were shot as they pulled him over while he was returning home from a burglary.

== Early life ==
In 1949, shortly after his release from juvenile detention, Sørensen broke into the headquarters of Danish labor union Dansk Arbejdsmands Forbund (today, 3F), where he blew open a safe with explosives stolen from a quarry and stole 130,000 kr., all of which he had spent shortly after.

He later committed several burglaries and instances of insurance fraud, but was eventually caught and received a 5-year prison sentence.

After his release from prison, Sørensen was hired to produce aerials for the army, and managed to bring his criminal lifestyle to a halt. However, in 1964, Sørensen encountered his former cellmate Norman Lee Bune, and resumed his former criminal activities of mainly burglaries.

Sørensen was known for his engineer-like prowess with technology and mechanics, and a 1958 article from the tabloid Ekstra Bladet described Sørensen as a man with a skill for cracking safes. He had a gun collection in his mother's basement.

== Shootings ==
On 17 September 1965 Sørensen and Bune were caught by the owner of a house they had broken into, who subsequently called the police. The men fled the scene and where pursued by police officers. During the chase, Sørensen was pulled over twice, each time reaching for his Browning P-35. In total four policemen where shot, all of whom died from the sustained injuries.

The incident resulted in a major search operation, lasting for 48 hours, ending with Sørensen turning himself in, commenting "[I] made the mistake of [my] life."

== Sentence ==
Sørensen was sentenced to life imprisonment on 24 August 1966. Despite being a peaceful prisoner, he was considered the most dangerous convict in Denmark for many years, and police unions pressured the authorities to grant him neither parole nor pardon.

He was granted parole after 32 years and eight months in prison – at the time the longest period anyone had served in a Danish prison in modern history.

== Life after prison ==
Sørensen went to live in Valby for the remainder of his life, confessing to a journalist he was still fascinated with safes. He died on 1 February 2018.

== Legacy ==
Palle Sørensen's crime eventually led to the arming of Danish police officers. The four murdered officers were given State funerals.
