= 2008 Greenlandic self-government referendum =

- 25 November 2008
- Do you want self-government to be introduced in Greenland with the content and conditions outlined in the Greenlandic-Danish Self-Government Commission's draft self-government law?

Results
| Choice | Votes | % |
|---|---|---|
| Yes | 21,355 | 76.22% |
| No | 6,663 | 23.78% |
| Valid votes | 28,018 | 99.12% |
| Invalid or blank votes | 250 | 0.88% |
| Total votes | 28,268 | 100.00% |
| Registered voters/turnout | 39,285 | 71.96% |

A non-binding referendum on Greenland's autonomy was held on 25 November 2008 to support or oppose the draft Greenland Self-Government Act. It was passed with 76% approval and a 72% turnout. The non-binding referendum was on expanded home rule in 30 areas, including police, courts, and the coast guard; gave Greenland a say in foreign policy; provided a more definite split of future oil revenue; and made the Greenlandic language the sole official language.

The referendum was announced by Prime Minister Hans Enoksen on 2 January 2008. Enoksen also announced the launch of an information and discussion campaign on the issue of self-government. This included town hall meetings throughout the country.

== Background ==
Greenland became a Denmark–Norway colony in 1775 and was made a province of Denmark in 1953. In 1979, it was made an autonomous country within the Kingdom of Denmark, with a parliament and local control of health care, schools, and social services. In 1985, it withdrew from the then European Economic Community (now known as the European Union) to maintain control of fishing in its waters. There has been some movement towards independence, encouraged by Denmark but held back by Greenland's need for economic subsidies.

A 2003 report from the Commission on Self-Governance outlined six possibilities for the future of Greenland. These were:

- Independence
- Union with another country, or otherwise known as a personal union with Denmark, similar to the former Kingdom of Iceland (1918–44)
- Free association, similar to the relationship between the United States and Palau, New Zealand and the Cook Islands, or the United Kingdom and its Dominions such as Canada and Australia at the beginning of the 20th century.
- Federation
- Increased self-government beyond the then-existing home rule.
- Complete integration

== Proposal and expansion of home rule ==
Although it was a non-binding referendum, the Danish parliament supported it and promised to honour its results. The expansion of home rule took effect on 21 June 2009, the 30th anniversary of the establishment of home rule, when the Act on Greenland Self-Government took effect.

Greenland gained greater control of the police, coast guard, and courts. In addition, the Greenlandic language became the sole official language.

Oil revenues will be divided differently, with the first 75 million Danish kroner (US$13.1 million) going to Greenland, and the remaining revenue split evenly with Denmark.

Greenland's subsidies from Copenhagen will be phased out. In 2008 the subsidy was 3.5 billion kroner ($588 million) per year, which accounted for about one-third of the island's gross domestic product of 10.5 billion kroner and almost two-thirds of the total income of the home rule government of 6.1 billion kroner.

Greenlanders are also recognized as a separate group of people under international law.

The changes were met with skepticism from some Danish politicians. Per Ørum Jørgensen, who helped negotiate the agreement, said that it may be "30–40 years" before Greenland is ready to take charge of itself. MP Søren Espersen from the Danish People's Party controversially claimed that Greenlanders had been "brainwashed with unprecedented propaganda" and that he believed "huge problems are waiting in the future".

== Results ==
The referendum passed. The Greenlandic government was pursuing future independence, and the result was seen by some observers as a "major step" in that direction.

| Choice | Votes | % |
|---|---|---|
| For | 21,355 | 76.22 |
| Against | 6,663 | 23.78 |
| Total | 28,018 | 100.00 |
| Valid votes | 28,018 | 99.12 |
| Invalid/blank votes | 250 | 0.88 |
| Total votes | 28,268 | 100.00 |
| Registered voters/turnout | 39,285 | 71.96 |
Source: Valg

== See also ==
- Greenlandic independence
- Politics of Greenland
- Law enforcement in Greenland
- Military of Greenland
