= Danish Penal Code =

Criminal law of Denmark

The Danish Penal Code, also known as the Danish Criminal Code (Danish: Straffeloven), is the codification of and the foundation of criminal law in Denmark. The updated official full text covers 29 chapters and is also available online (in Danish).

The Penal Code contains "the most serious and most of the most well-known crimes" while more specialized crimes can be found in subject-specific laws such as the Traffic Act or the Weapons Act. However, serious violations of the rules in subject-specific laws might be independently criminalized in the Penal Code. Certain low-level nuisance crimes are listed in the Public Order Decree.

The Penal Code consists of two parts. The first, consisting of chapters 1–11 (§§ 1–97 c) contains what is generally known as the general part of the criminal law, i.e. the conditions for criminal responsibility, possible punishments and guidelines for metering them out and other rules common to all crimes. The second, consisting of chapters 12–29 (§§ 98–306) contains the crimes themselves.

== Penalties ==
Possible penalties for violating the Danish penal code are:

- Between 1 and 60 day-fines (§ 51),
- Time-limited prison sentences of between 7 days and 20 days (§ 33), with the possibility of parole after half the time (but at least two months) served (§ 38),
- Imprisonment for life (§ 33), with the possibility of parole after 12 years (§ 41),
- Suspended prison sentence, possibly with up to 6 months not suspended (§ 58), and subject to up to five years of probation (§ 56) and up to 300 hours of community service (§ 63).

Children under the age of 15 are ineligible for punishment (§ 15), and children under the age of 18 cannot be sentenced to life imprisonment (§ 33.2).

Offenders found to be acting irrationally due to a severe mental illness or handicap are always ineligible for punishment, while offenders with diminished responsibility may be ruled ineligible for punishment on a case-by-case basis (§ 16). Such offenders may, however, be subject to other measures, such as monitoring, psychiatric treatment, or a "placement sentence" of indeterminate length (§ 68).

Particularly dangerous offenders may be given a "custody sentence" of indeterminate length (§ 70).

== History ==
Before the Penal Code of 1866 Denmark used Danish Code.

After the introduction of the Penal Code of 1866, there had been a growing sentiment in the late 19th century and early 20th century for a new penal code. After the Judicial Reform of 1916 (Danish: Retsplejeloven/Retsplejereformen af 1916), the sense of urgency surrounding the need for a new penal code increased further. The sentiment had already risen as it became clear that the Penal Code of 1866 was built on old principles which, over time, had become outdated and were seen as less compatible with the modern society of the period. Conversely, the Judicial Reform strengthened the feeling and need for a new penal code, because the Penal Code of 1866 had been constructed for a fundamentally different legal system, which had been significantly altered by the reform.

Already in 1905, the first commission was appointed by a Venstre government and led by the conservative politician Carl Goos, with the purpose of reviewing the general civil criminal legislation and drafting a proposal to replace the Penal Code of 1866. Goos was a prominent figure within Danish law in the late 19th century. He belonged to the classical school within criminal law, the same school that had led to the progressive changes in the Penal Code of 1866, but by this time he could be seen as having a decidedly conservative standpoint within Danish criminal law. Goos himself was skeptical of the modern legal science schools that had begun to emerge in the late 1800s, which was also reflected in the commission’s 1912 report. It contained few new elements in the field of criminal law, and the proposal was set aside by the Zahle government in 1917.

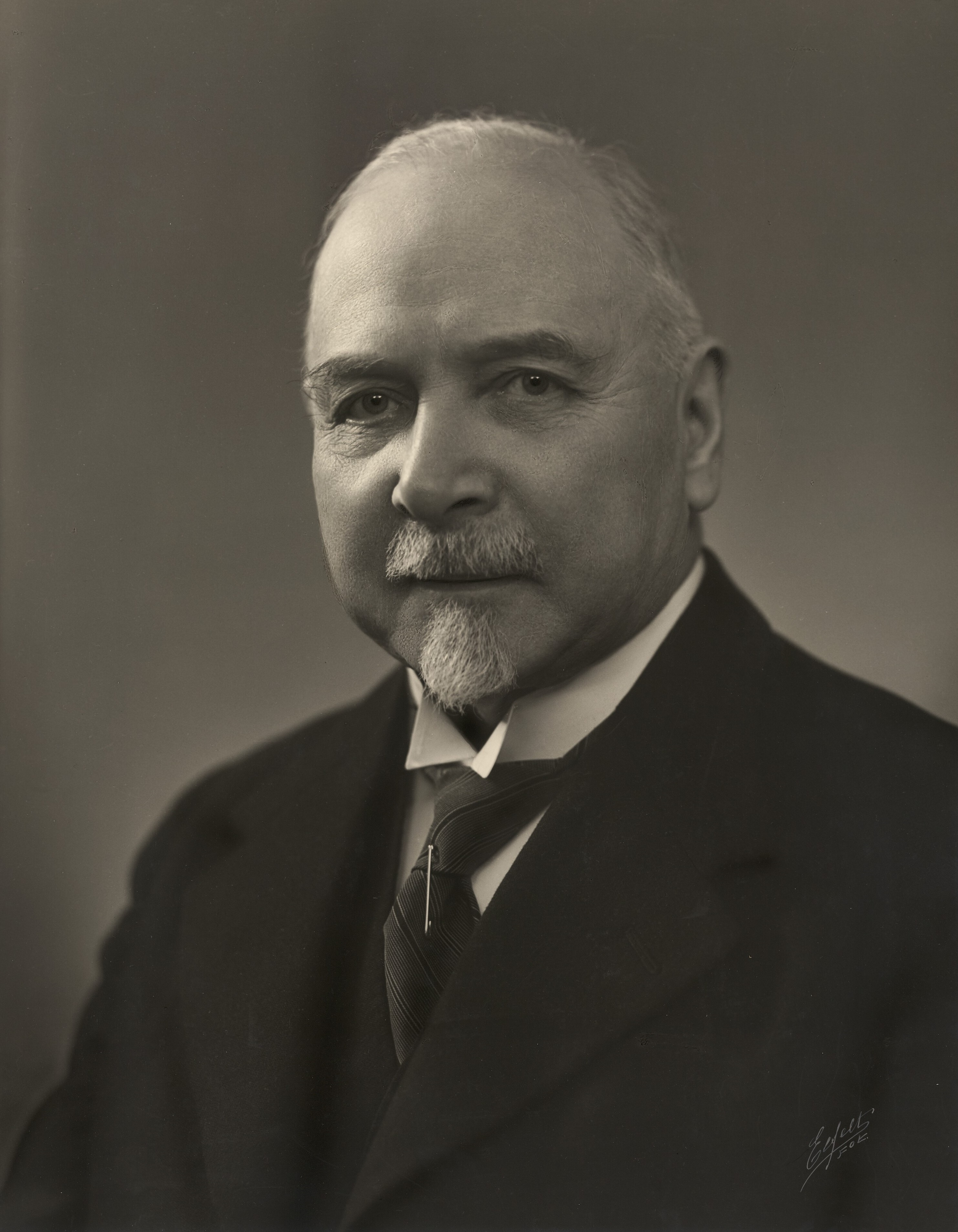
Carl Theodor Zahle

In 1913, a Social Liberal government under Carl Theodor Zahle took office, and in 1914 the Ministry of Justice asked Carl Torp to submit an opinion on the Criminal Law Commission’s 1912 report. Unlike Goos, Torp was more familiar with the new legal schools and principles. Torp chose not to submit an opinion on the 1912 report, but instead to produce an entirely new report with new draft legislation in 1917. In his draft, Torp emphasized the need for a commission that also included representatives of practical criminal law. That same year, the Criminal Law Commission was established on Torp’s recommendation, and in 1923 it submitted its report. The report did not contain any radical breaks with the existing penal code, but it did include the introduction of special treatment for different types of offenders, allowing greater emphasis on the offender’s subjective characteristics rather than solely on the committed crime.

In July 1924, the newly appointed Social Democratic Minister of Justice Karl Kristian Steincke presented his outline for a “completely new Penal Code based on modern principles and on the experts’ commission report” at a meeting in Copenhagen. That same year, a bill for a new penal code was introduced, and again in 1925 and 1926, but the proposal was not completed. In 1928, the new Liberal government introduced a partially revised proposal, but again it was not completed. In 1929, the government changed to the Social Democratic–Social Liberal coalition under Thorvald Stauning, which again introduced a partially revised proposal, leading to some changes being implemented as the current Danish Penal Code.

In the proposal for the new Penal Code of 1930, emphasis was placed on treating different types of offenders differently. This meant that attention was no longer directed solely at the crime itself, but also at the offender’s particular circumstances and character. This approach became a central part of the Penal Code of 1930, which came into force in 1933. With the new law, the death penalty was abolished, even though it had not been used in practice since 1892. At the same time, special rules were introduced for certain groups of offenders, such as young people, the mentally ill, and dangerous or habitual criminals.

Another important change was the reduction in the number of different types of punishment. Whereas the old penal code operated with seven forms of deprivation of liberty—including simple imprisonment, imprisonment on water and bread, workhouse labor, and forced labor—the system was simplified to only two: "hæfte" (the mildest form of deprivation of liberty) and imprisonment. The Penal Code of 1866 had very narrow frameworks for how punishment should be determined, but with the 1930 law, the sentencing ranges were significantly expanded. This gave judges greater opportunity to tailor the punishment to the specific case. The descriptions of individual crimes were not changed to any great extent, but the general part of the law was made more clear and modern.

The current Penal Code is law number 126 of April 15, 1930, with later amendments. It came automatically into effect on January 1, 1933, replacing a wide range of previous laws, including the general penalty law of February 10, 1866. Law number 127 of April 15, 1930, describes all previous laws invalidated. It has since been changed or amended a large number of times, especially in the last 15 years, with between 5 and 10 changes each year.

The 1930 Penal Code is based on a series of official reports from 1912, 1917 and 1923.

- (1912) "Betænkning afgiven af Kommissionen nedsat til at foretage et Gennemsyn af den almindelige borgerlige Straffelovgivning" ("Report of the commission that was appointed to perform a review of the ordinary civil penal legislation").
- (1917) "Betænkning angaaende de af den ... nedsatte Straffelovkommission udarbejdede Forslag ... ", udarbejdet af Carl Torp ("Report regarding the proposals drafted by the ... appointed penal code commission ... ", prepared by Carl Torp).
- (1923) "Betænkning afgiven af Straffelovskommissionen af 9. November 1917" ("Report from the penal code commission of November 9, 1917").
