= Herstedvester Prison =

Prison in Denmark

Coordinates: 55.6603°N 12.3478°E

- Interactive map of Herstedvester Prison
- Location: Herstedvester, Capital Region of Denmark, Denmark.
- Status: Operational
- Population: 166
- Opened: 1935
- Managed by: The Danish Prison and Probation Service

Herstedvester Prison (Danish: Herstedvester Fængsel) is a prison in Herstedvester, Greater Copenhagen, Denmark, for treatment by the Danish Prison and Probation Service. It houses convicted felons and occasionally people with custody rulings in need of psychiatric assistance and observation.

Herstedvester was built in 1935 for the detention and imprisonment of psychopaths. Upon establishment, they were the first European prison to use a treatment method known as democratic therapeutic community. The institution has a capacity of 143 people in the closed section and 23 in the semi-open section.

Greenlandic prisoners considered too high risk for the open-style prisons in Greenland all used to serve in Herstedvester. In 2019, Greenland's first fully closed prison opened in the capital Nuuk and Greenlandic prisoners in Herstedvester were offered a transfer. However, a large proportion have wished to continue serving their sentence in Herstedvester instead of Nuuk.

Several notable inmates have for periods stayed at Herstedvester, including Abel Klemmensen, Peter Lundin and Peter Madsen.
