= Closed prison =

Prison with extensive supervision of inmates

Closed prisons are prisons with the high level of supervision of the inmates. The opposite is an open prison. Closed prisons may have further categorization in terms of security.

== Finland ==
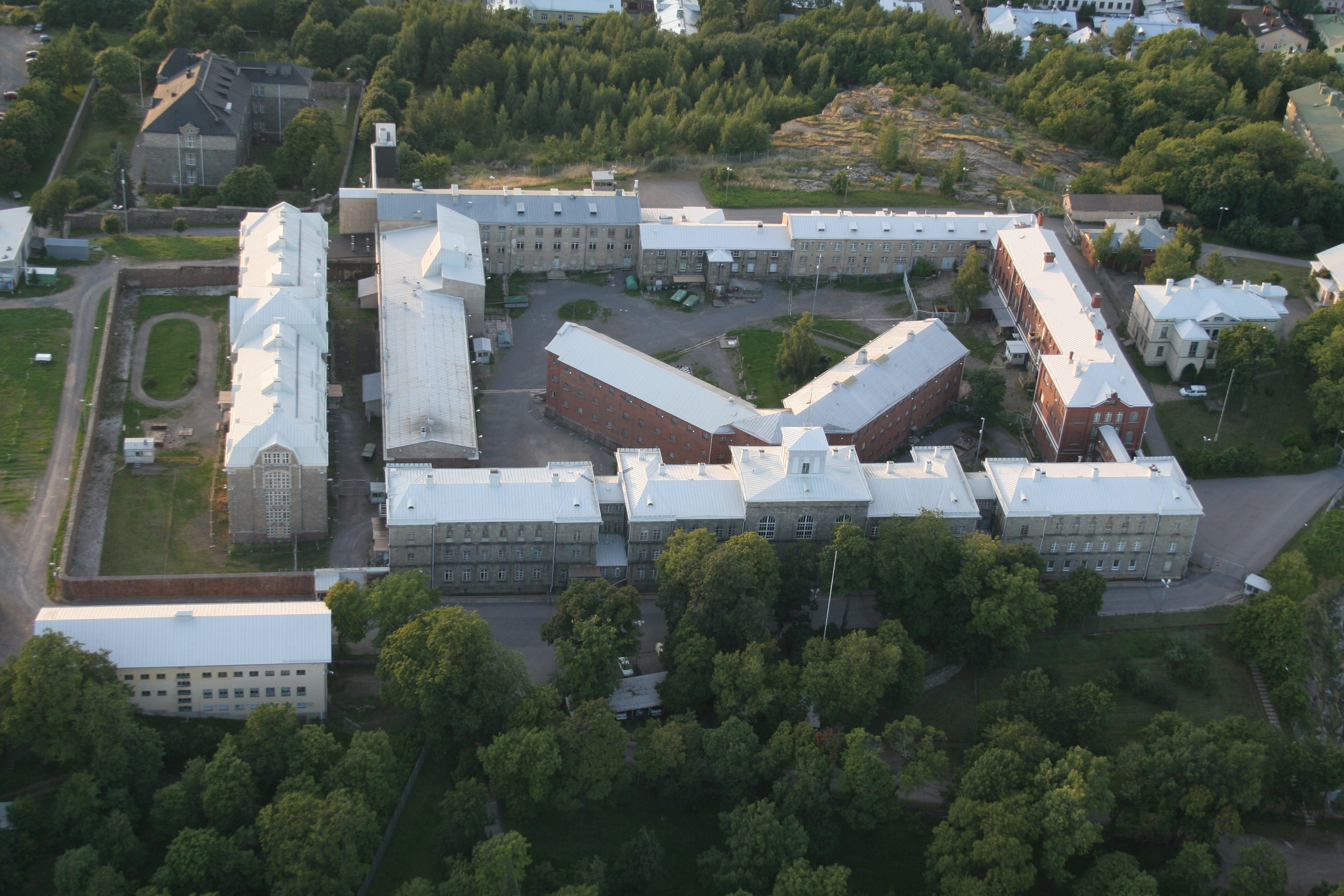
Aerial view of Turku Prison

As of 2023, of the 28 prisons in Finland, 70% of inmates are in closed prisons and 30% in open prisons or units. In 2021, an average cost for an inmate in a closed prison was 82,500 euros a year, 225 euros a day. In an open prison the cost is 168 euros a day. Supervised probation costs 63 euros per prisoner per day. The Prison and Probation Service of Finland declared that their goal is to gradually move from closed to open prison environment.

In 2017 there were 57 males and 16 females in closed prisons and 5 males and 1 female in open prisons.

== Denmark ==
In Denmark, state prisons may be closed, semi-open, and open. In local prisons and in the Western Prison in Copenhagen many rules are the same as in closed state prisons. A closed prison has more staff and control than an open prison and has stricter rules about money, telephone calls, visits, etc. For example, inmate's letters from closed state prisons are usually checked before being posted, with the exception of letters from and to certain higher authorities. In open state prisons, letters are usually not checked. It is illegal for visitors to bring a cell phone to a closed prison.

== Turkey ==
In Turkey, there are three types of prisons: closed, semi-open (currently abolished), and open. Closed prisons have a further subcategory of high-security prisons (F-type prison). There are closed prisons for adult men, adult women, children (Turkish: çocuk tutukluların ("child detainees"), ages between 12 and 18) and minors (Turkish: gençlik, ages 18–21).

Per Article 8 of the Turkish prison law, closed penal institutions (Turkish: kapalı ceza infaz kurumları) are ones in which there are internal and external security guards, equipped with technical, mechanical, electronic or physical barriers against escape, room and corridor doors are generally kept closed. External contacts with inmates are possible only under adequate security provisions. Closed institutions for children and minors provide for education and training under adequate security measures against escape, including internal and external security guards.

== United Kingdom ==
Of four categories for adult categories (A, B, C, D) in England and Wales, the first three are of closed type.

== United States ==
In the United States, prisons have the following levels of security: supermax, maximum security (called high security in the federal system), close security, medium security, and minimum security.
