= TM65 =

Rocket engine

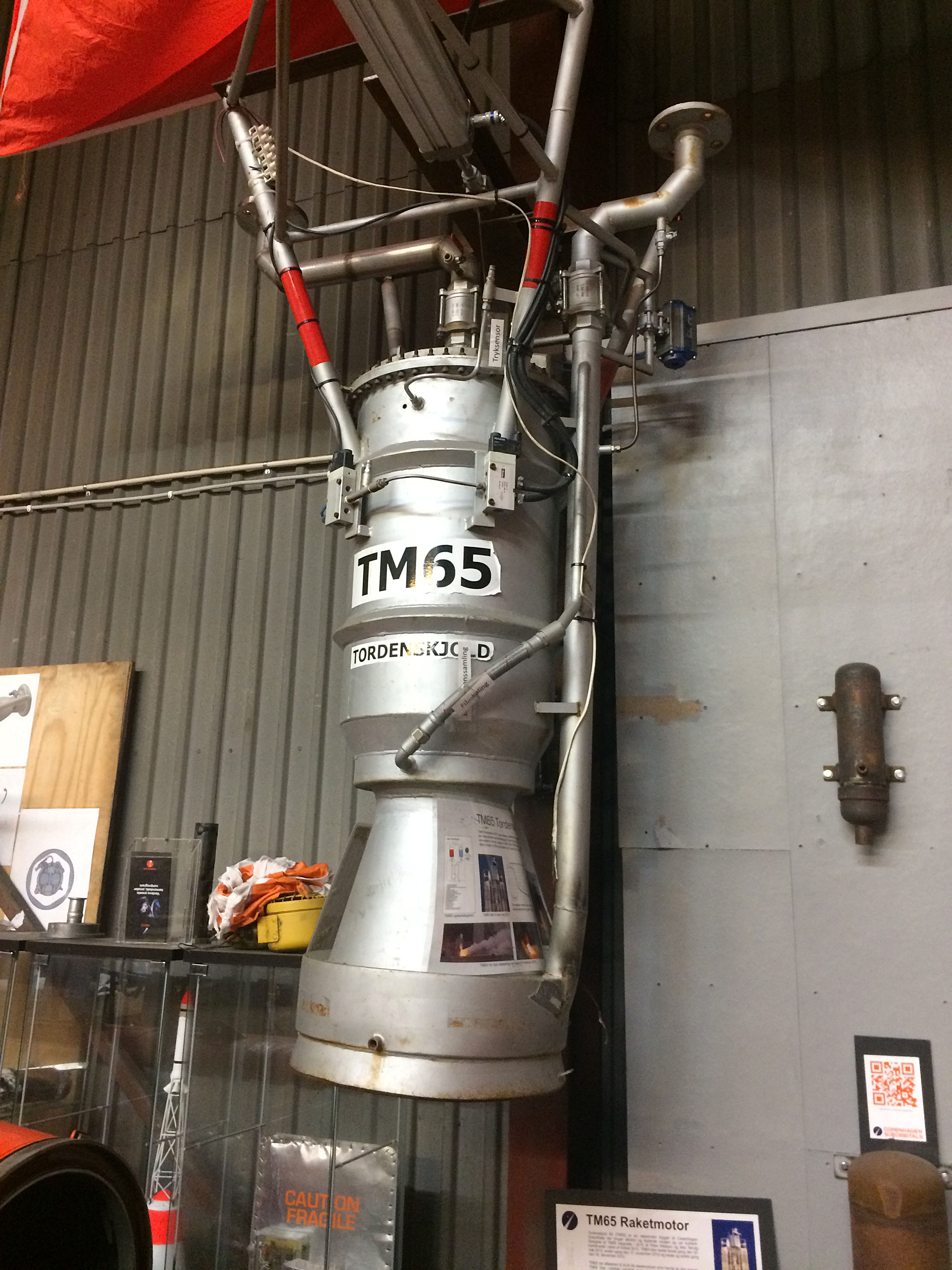
- Country of origin: Denmark
- Designer: Copenhagen Suborbitals
- Manufacturer: Copenhagen Suborbitals
- Application: lower stage booster
- Predecessor: XLR-3A, XLR-3B
- Status: In development

Liquid-fuel engine
- Propellant: LOX / Ethanol
- Mixture ratio: 75 % vol Ethanol / 25 % water
- Cycle: Gas-generator

Configuration
- Chamber: L* = 200 cm
- Nozzle ratio: 1:4.5

Performance
- Thrust, vacuum: 85 kN (19,000 lb_{f})
- Thrust, sea-level: 65 kN (15,000 lb_{f})
- Thrust-to-weight ratio: 75:1
- Chamber pressure: 1.2 MPa (12 bar)
- Specific impulse, vacuum: 230 seconds (2.3 km/s)
- Specific impulse, sea-level: 200 seconds (2.0 km/s)
- Burn time: 100 sec as used in HEAT 2X launch vehicle

Dimensions
- Length: total 1700 mm
- Diameter: chamber 400 mm
- Dry mass: 75 kg

Used in
- Planned use in HEAT 2X launch vehicle

TM65 is a rocket engine developed by Copenhagen Suborbitals. TM65 uses Ethanol and liquid oxygen as propellants in a pressure-fed power cycle.

== Development ==
Construction of the prototype rocket engine TM65 was started in 2010, completed in the spring of 2012 and test fired in May and November 2012. It is planned to change the engine to be fed by a turbine pump.

== Description ==
The TM65 uses a 75% ethanol/water mixture for fuel and liquid oxygen (LOX) for oxidizer. It has a regeneratively cooled nozzle. Nitrogen was used in the first tests to pressurize the propellant tanks, heated in a heat exchanger in the nozzle.

=== TM65 Engine Specifications ===
- Power Cycle: Gas-generator (initially pressure-fed)

Propellants

- Oxidizer: Liquid Oxygen
- Fuel (by volume): 75% Alcohol, 25% Water
- Fuel (by mass): 63% Ethyl alcohol, 7% Isopropyl alcohol, 30% Water
- O/F Ratio: 1.3

Cooling

- Combustion Chamber: Regenerative
- Nozzle: Regenerative & Film cooling
- 15% of fuel flow is directed to nozzle film cooling via 2 x 7.3 mm tubes, injected via 56 x 2.0 mm orifices

Injector

- Impingement Type: Like-on-like
- Fuel Ports: 100 x 2.5 mm holes; 50 pairs
- Oxidizer Ports: 132 x 2.5 mm holes; 66 pairs

Cooling Jacket

- Type: Annular
- Nozzle Flowspeed: 5.4 m/s
- Chamber Flowspeed: 2.5 m/s

Combustion Chamber

- Specific Length (L*): 2.0 m
- Nozzle Throat Area: 450 cm^{2}
- Nozzle Exit Area: 1963 cm^{2}
- Nozzle Expansion Ratio: 4.36

Nominal Operating Data

- Chamber Pressure at 100% Rated Thrust: 12.0 bars
- Nominal Sea Level Thrust: 65 kN @ Cf 1.2
- Nominal Sea Level ISP: 200 s
- Nominal Vacuum ISP: 235 s

=== TM65 Turbopump Specifications ===
Liquid Oxygen Pump

- Type: Centrifugal
- Power Method: Single stage impulse turbine
- Rotation Frequency: 4300 rpm
- Inlet Pressure: 2 bars
- Outlet Pressure: 20 bars
- Flow: 20 kg/s
- Power Consumption: 50 kW

Fuel Pump

- Type: Centrifugal
- Power Method: Single stage impulse turbine
- Rotation Frequency: 6200 rpm
- Inlet Pressure: 2 bars
- Outlet Pressure: 20 bars
- Flow: 15 kg/s
- Power Consumption: 50 kW

Gas Generator

- Propellant: 80% H_{2}O_{2}
- Catalyst: KMnO_{4} solid
- Propellant Mass Flow: 0.45 kg/s
- Gas Components: Steam, Oxygen
- Gas Temperature: 275 °C
- Gas Pressure: 25 bars

The turbopump is controlled by an electronic controller which measures outlet pressure and RPM, adjusting H_{2}O_{2} flow as necessary. Each of the two turbine & pump units have a gas generator, and the units are mounted back to back but rotate in opposite directions and at different speeds.

== History ==
Construction of the prototype rocket engine Tordenskjold 65 (TM65) was started in the fall of 2010 after a range of successful tests with its predecessor XLR-3A. The project was run parallel to Copenhagen Suborbitals hybrid rocket engine project that was used to power the HEAT-1X rocket and its payload Tycho Brahe.

After a few months of development the project was halted to focus on the launch of HEAT-1X in the summer of 2011.

The development and testing of TM65 was restarted in 2012 to explore if it was a viable replacement for the hybrid engine that Copenhagen Suborbitals previously had favored. Construction of the first prototype TM65 engine was completed in the spring of 2012 and successfully test fired in May 2012. Tests were planned and executed throughout the fall and winter of 2012 in an attempt to raise chamber pressure to the planned 12 bars, which should produce 65 kN of thrust.

== See also ==
- HEAT 1X Rocket
