= Single-person spacecraft =

Type of spacecraft with one occupant

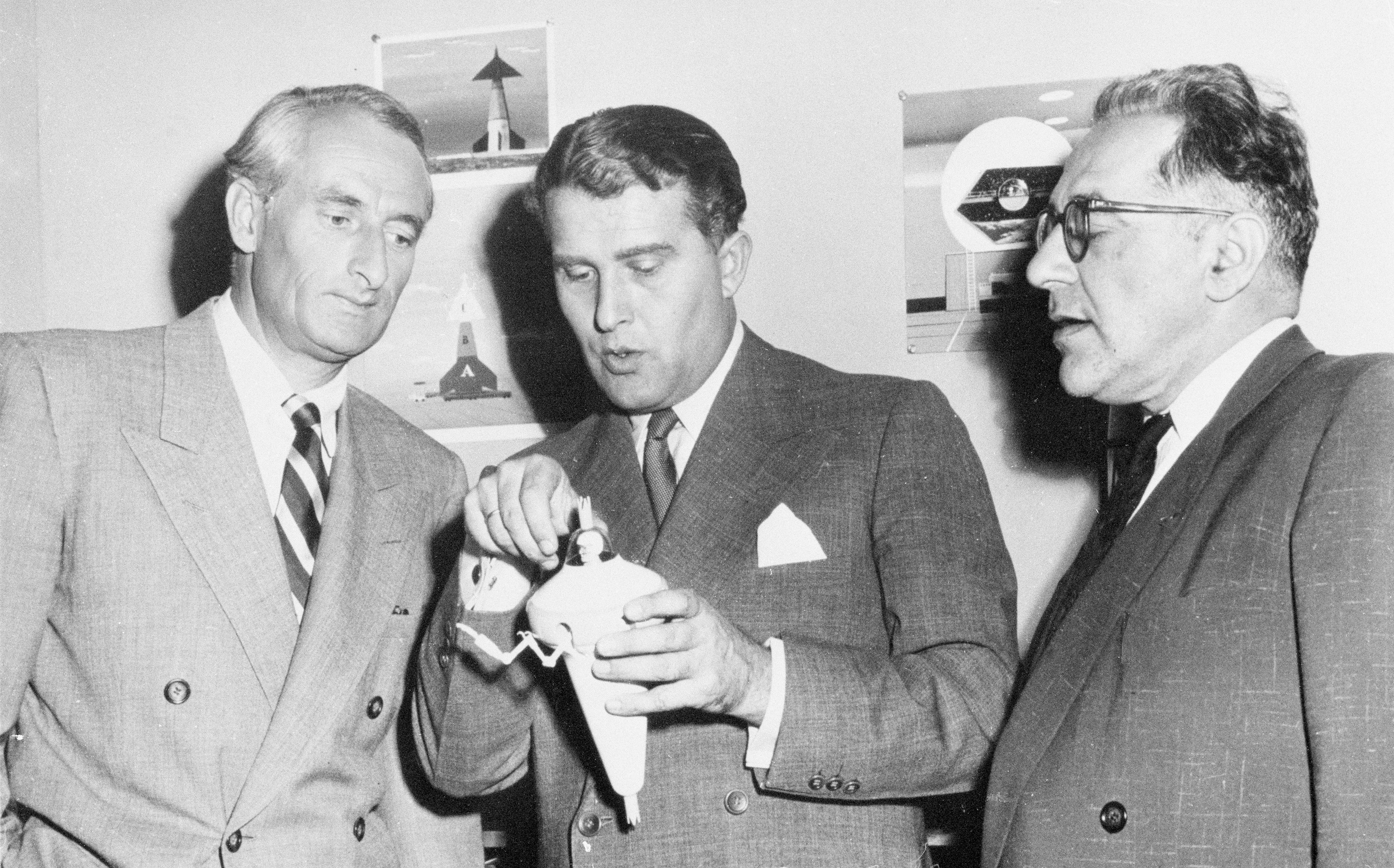
Von Braun holds a model of a bottle-suit also called a single person spacecraft

A single-person spacecraft is a vehicle designed for space travel. The concept has been used in science fiction and actual ships such as the Mercury capsule, Vostok and some suborbital designs. Single-person spacecraft have been envisioned as a supplement or replacement for space suits in certain applications. The Von Braun Bottle suit of the 1950s functions as a hybrid of a space suit and a one-person spacecraft.

== Capsule-suits ==
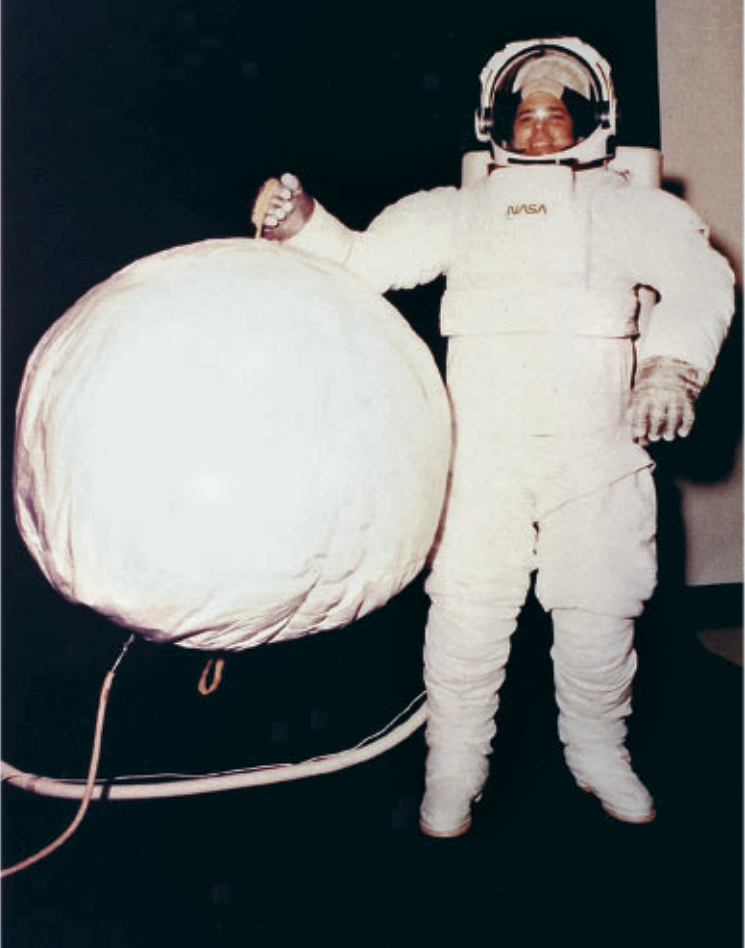
Personal Rescue Enclosure is the ball on the left

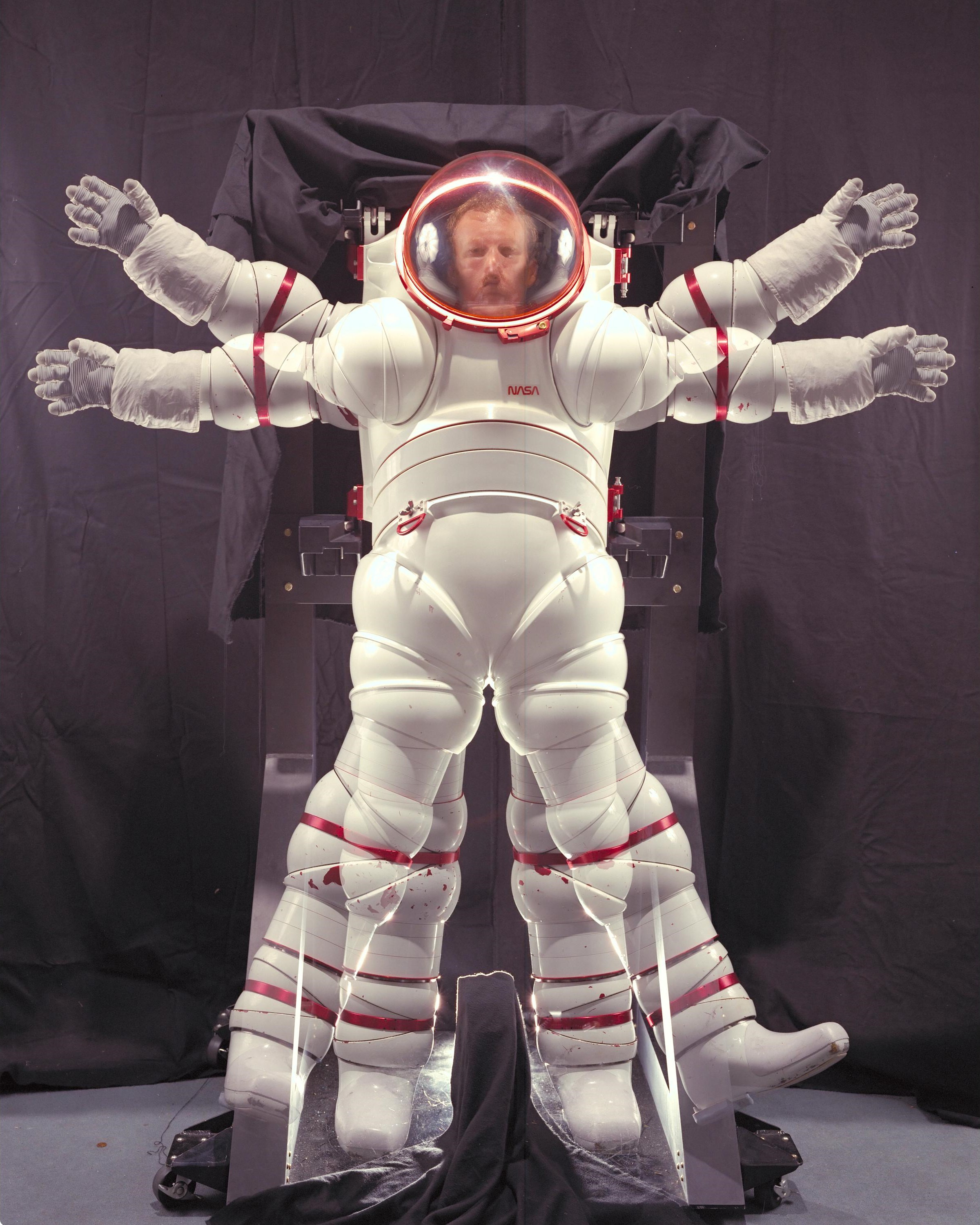
NASA AX-5 hard space suit

The idea of a capsule-suit is that of a man-sized capsule, something beyond form-fitting space suits and rigid suits similar to EVA.

Wernher von Braun, known for the moonshot project, proposed a conical bottle suit in the 1950s. In 1965, the Grumman moon suit had a hard bottle enclosure allowing the user's arms to fully retract into the suit.

In the 1970s, NASA worked on the AX-3 Hardsuit. In the 1980s, NASA Ames center developed the AX-5 hard suit to avoid having to pre-breathe for lower-pressure suits than the host spacecraft. A NASA space suit with some hard elements (named the I-Suit), was developed later.

The Manned Maneuvering Unit is noted in regard to the single-person spacecraft, and it was tested in space in 1984 during a Space Shuttle flight. Highly compact single-person spacecraft have been considered by ISS for EVA work, to avoid having to go through the decompression needed to use the lower-pressure space suits. NASA developed a body-shaped single person spacecraft called FlexCraft, with the idea of allowing more and shorter EVA. The spacecraft would be at the same atmospheric pressure as the ISS, thus removing the medical stress and time needed to decompress and compress, and the danger of the bends. A single-person spacecraft could also enhance protection against micrometeoroid impacts and radiation from cosmic rays.

The Personal Rescue Enclosure was developed for the Space Shuttle. On the ISS the combination of a Space Suit, the Simplified Aid For EVA Rescue (SAFER) and Extravehicular Mobility Unit are used, combined to form a soft-suit spacecraft for emergencies.

A demonstration of single-person spacecraft for ISS, called the FlexCraft, was proposed in the 2010s. In 2018 a single person spacecraft capsule tested in a water pool by NASA. This design has a hatch at the bottom that an astronaut could enter into, but it would be at full pressure thus avoiding the need to purge nitrogen from the body for low-pressure suits. The capsule suit has robotic manipulators, and could be used for some of the tasks currently done in space suits, but the capsule suit would also have enhanced micrometeoroid protection and a higher pressure atmosphere.

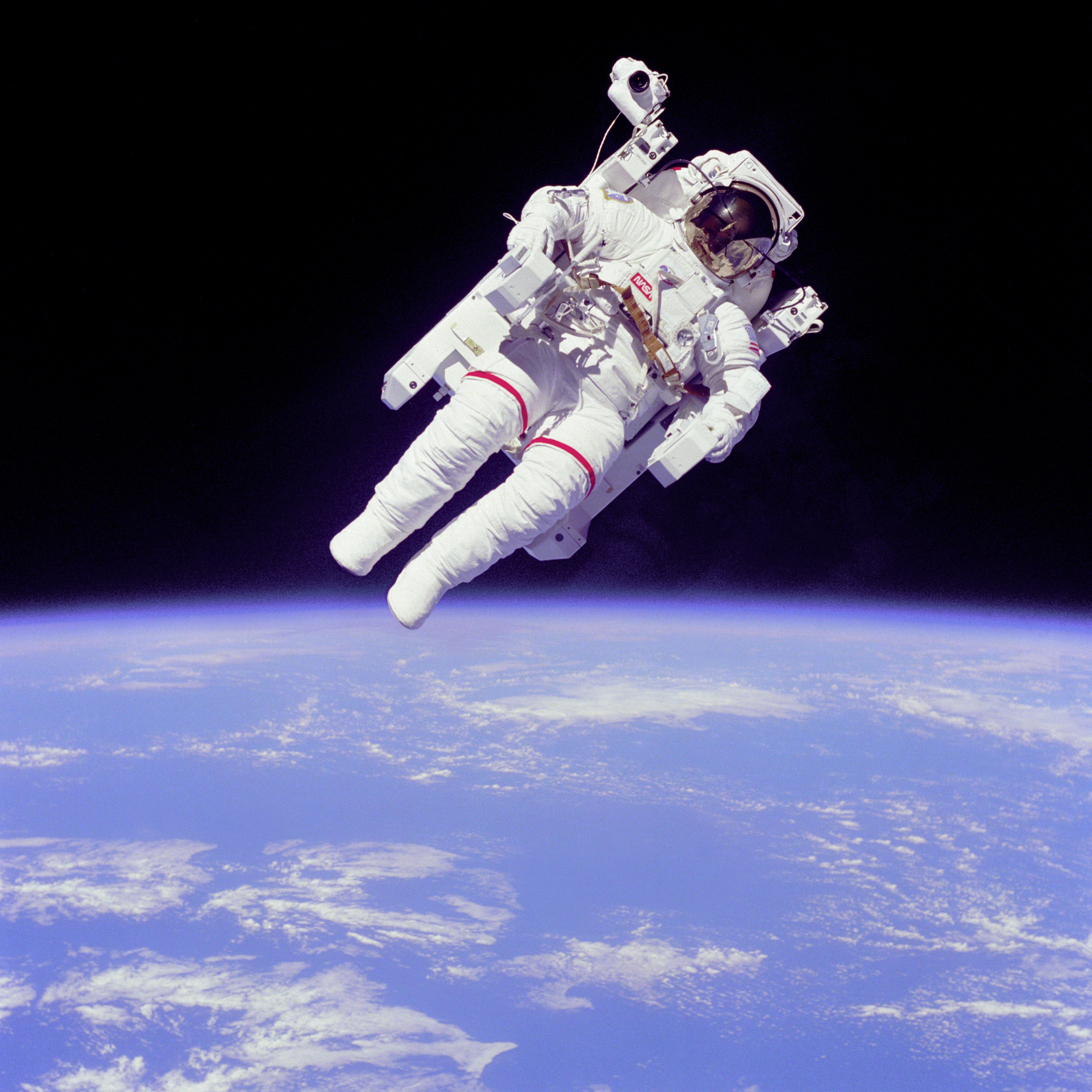
The Shuttle EMU coupled with the manned maneuvering unit enable untethered omnidirectional spaceflight for one

=== List of capsule-suits ===
- NASA FlexCraft
- Von Braun Bottle Suit
- Bell Labs Remora
- University of Maryland Scout
- Manned Autonomous Workstation (MAWS)
- MAWS 2

== Spacecraft for one ==
Historical spacecraft designed for single-person crews:

- North American X-15 (sub-orbital)
- Vostok (spacecraft)
- Mercury Capsule
- Boeing X-20 Dyna-Soar (Would have carried one air force astronaut, proposed never got past the development phase and never flew.)
- Shenzhou (spacecraft) (Shenzhou 5 carried 1 Taikonaut)
- LK (spacecraft)
- Soyuz (spacecraft) (Soyuz 1 & 3 had only 1 Cosmonaut onboard)
- Tycho Brahe

In the early 2010s, a company in Denmark called Copenhagen Suborbitals built a design for a one-man spaceship for sub-orbital flight, powered by the HEAT 1-X rocket. The one-man spacecraft they called Tycho Brahe was not used in space or a crewed sub-orbital flight. One in-atmosphere test flight of the prototype was conducted with a crash test dummy.

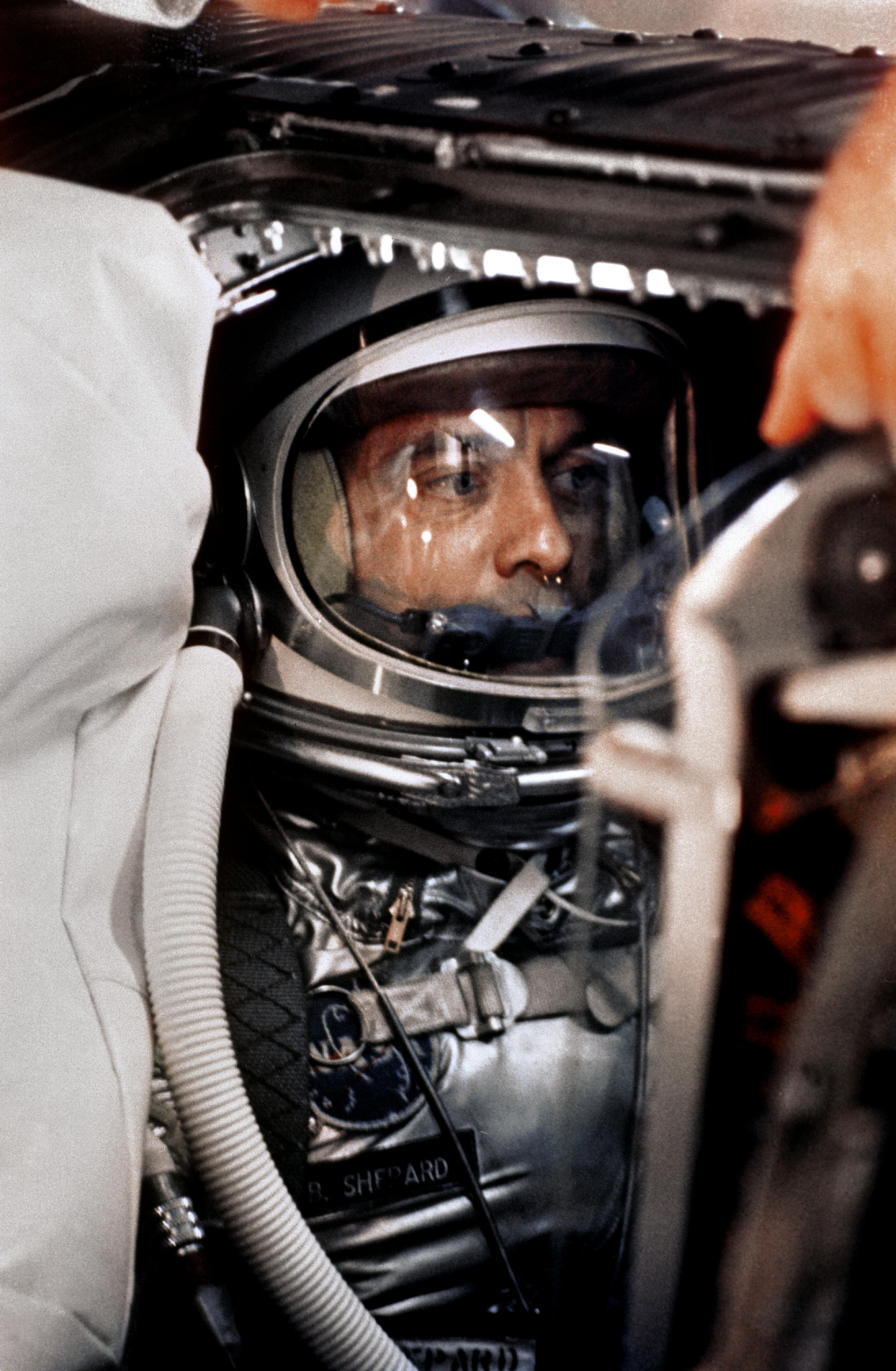
Alan Shepard in the Freedom 7 capsule before launch

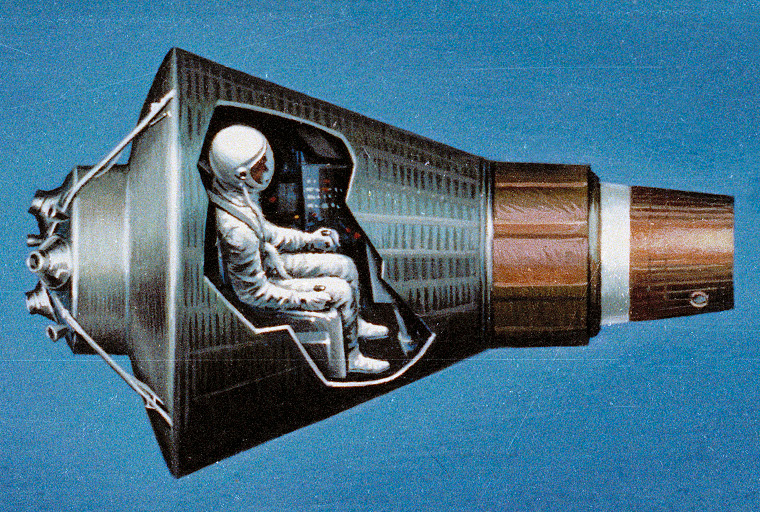
Cutaway diagram-art of the Mercury orbital spacecraft

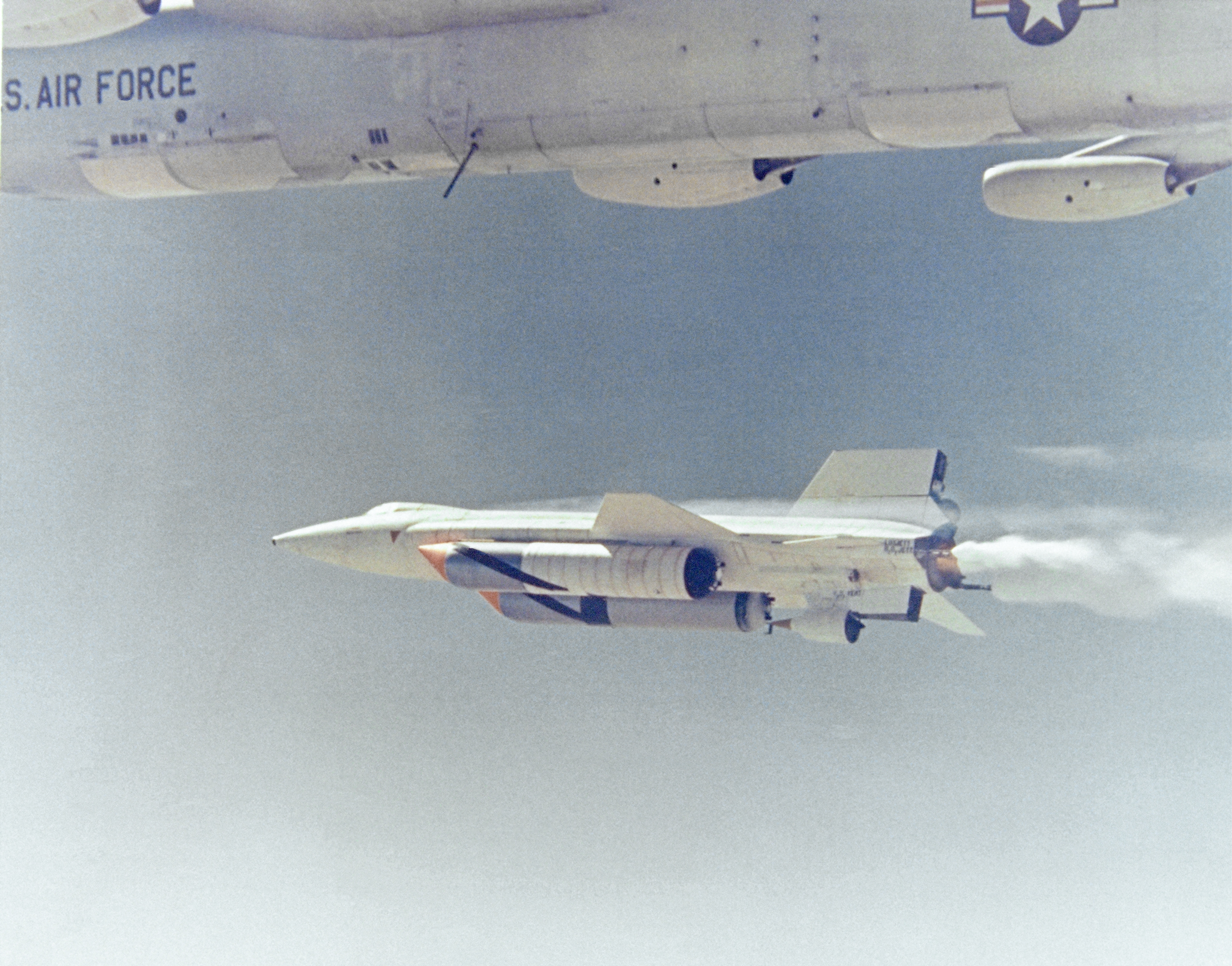
X-15A2, with sealed ablative coating and external fuel tanks for a high-altitude rocket flight

== See also ==
- Space capsule
- Space activity suit
- Suitport
- Mars suit
- MOOSE
