= Lunar escape systems =

Series of proposed emergency spacecraft for the Apollo Program

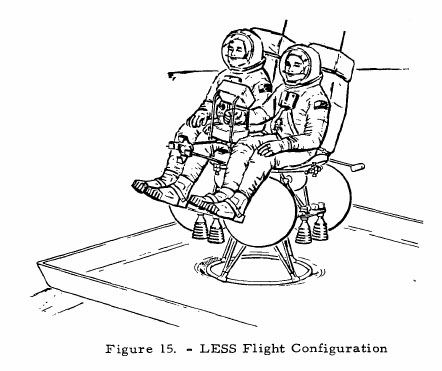
Concept of LESS

Lunar escape systems (LESS) were a series of emergency vehicles designed for never-flown long-duration Apollo missions. Because these missions were more hypothetical than the planned cancelled Apollo missions, the designs were never constructed. This concept was an outgrowth of the Lunar Flying Vehicle by Bell Aerospace (a lunar surface mobility design that was cancelled in favor of the less risky Lunar Rover).

== Details ==
As NASA planned for longer stays on the Moon after the first few Apollo flights, they had to consider new issues, one of which was what to do if the astronauts cannot get back. Typically the longer a spacecraft is idle the less reliable it becomes, so after a stay of two weeks on the Moon the Lunar Module ascent engine or other essential systems might fail to function, leaving the astronauts stranded on the Moon without enough supplies to survive until a rescue mission could arrive from Earth.

For one possible solution, NASA studied a number of low-cost, low-mass lunar escape systems (LESS) which could be carried on the lunar module as a backup, like a lifeboat on a ship.

'KISS' was the order of the day, with a few basic assumptions about any operational LESS system:

1. The LESS would use fuel from the LM ascent stage tanks, so no extra fuel would be carried on the mission.
2. Rather than the multiple redundant systems used elsewhere in the Apollo program, the LESS would be as simple as possible while still achieving its mission.
3. All life support would come from the astronauts' space-suit backpacks. This greatly reduced the mass and complexity of the LESS, but required that the astronauts could rendezvous with the orbiting CSM within the four-hour backpack oxygen supply.
4. The LESS would support stays of up to 14 days on the lunar surface.

Unpacking the LESS from the lunar module

The LESS had to be as light as possible so as not to significantly reduce the cargo capacity of the LEM, and easy to pack into the LM in such a way that it would not interfere with the other cargo. One consequence was that most designs used detachable legs: the legs would be set up on the lunar surface, the LESS assembled on top of them, and the legs then left behind as the LESS launched. This did not directly reduce the mass required, but it did reduce the empty mass of the LESS, which reduced the fuel required to lift it to orbit, which also reduced the thrust required from the engines and the total mass of the design.

The LESS would pack flat in the side of the LM descent stage, and arms and wires would be provided to allow controlled removal of the LESS and ensure it did not harm the astronaut who was removing it. A protective cover also doubled as a sled, so the LESS could be pushed or pulled along the ground to reach a safe launch position prior to assembly. The assembly operations were expected to take at least forty-five minutes, with a further two hours for checkout and fueling before launch. On long-duration missions the crew might assemble the LESS early in the mission as a precaution.

Given the cut-down nature of the LESS compared to a typical spacecraft of its era, the primary differences between designs were in propulsion, guidance, navigation and control.

=== Propulsion ===
Typical LESS designs used flexible fuel tanks so that it could fold flat for storage. When the LESS was connected to the LM ascent stage, the flexible tanks would be filled and expand to their full size ready for flight.

Some LESS designs used a single engine under the center, but many used multiple engines around the edge, typically based on the Apollo reaction control system (RCS) thrusters used for attitude control on the command and service module (CSM) and lunar module (LM). These had a thrust of around 100 pounds-force (440 N) each, so putting eight thrusters in pairs at the corners of a square gave enough thrust to lift two astronauts to orbit.

Another benefit of the RCS-based designs was that the RCS thrusters could be fired in bursts as short as ten milliseconds, so instead of complex throttling hardware they could be pulsed to adjust the average thrust over time. They could also be used to provide attitude control by varying the firing rate of different thrusters around the edge of the LESS.

=== Guidance ===
Guidance in typical LESS designs was simple: an 'eight-ball' to show spacecraft attitude, a clock to show time since liftoff, and a planned pitch program. The Apollo Guidance Computer used as an autopilot for the CSM and LM had a mass of around a hundred pounds and consumed a significant amount of power, so computer controlled flight was out of the question. This would be one of the few cases where an astronaut flew a rocket manually all the way to orbit, and with far less instrumentation than normal.

The astronauts would wait until the appropriate liftoff time that would put them into an orbit close to the CSM, then launch. The pilot would attempt to hold a constant heading, and at predetermined times during the burn he would adjust the pitch to predetermined angles. This controlled the vertical and horizontal velocity of the LESS and consequently the orbit that it would enter: the engine would be shut down at a predetermined time when they should have reached the correct orbit.

Even if the pilot made a few errors on the way to space, that was not necessarily fatal. The CSM had a fuel reserve, and plans would allow it to change velocity by a maximum of around 250 meters per second in order to rendezvous with the LESS after orbit insertion. While that did not allow much change in orbital inclination, the CSM could significantly change orbital altitude to match the LESS. The biggest threat from piloting errors was that the crew would run out of oxygen before the CSM could reach them.

The LESS would be equipped with a flashing light and VHF radio beacon to simplify tracking from the CSM. On reaching the rendezvous point the CSM pilot would dock with the LESS using the same docking probe that was used to dock with the LM, and a special attachment on the front of the LESS. This would require some skilled flying on the part of the pilot, as any use of the front-facing RCS jets could present a serious hazard to the astronauts on the LESS if the hot exhaust gases hit them.

Once docked the CSM pilot would depressurize the Command Module and open the hatch to space, so the astronauts on the LESS could use the external hand-holds on the Command Module to crawl to the hatch and climb inside. The crew would then separate the CSM from the LESS and leave it in lunar orbit when they returned to Earth.

=== Navigation ===
There was no mass or power available in the LESS for an Inertial Measurement Unit to measure acceleration and tell the astronauts where they were, where they were going or how fast they would be getting there, or even for a radar altimeter to show altitude above the lunar surface.

In deep space this would have made navigation difficult, but the astronauts were close to the lunar surface, so other options were available. Most plans called for the astronauts to use landmarks on the lunar surface to control their heading while the pitch program took care of altitude and velocity. By keeping the landmark in the correct position relative to the LESS, they would know they were on the right course. Some designs included a graduated screen in front of the pilot showing relative angle to lunar landmarks.

=== Control ===
LESS attitude control varied widely among designs. Some used the main engine for attitude control by gimballing the engine nozzle to alter the direction of thrust. Others had multiple engines and could use relative throttling or pulse-rate to vary the thrust from the different engines and control attitude that way. A few used cold gas RCS thrusters where high-pressure gas (typically nitrogen) was released from nozzles to provide a small amount of thrust without endangering the crew with hot gas from a rocket thruster. Most provided the pilot with a simple control stick arrangement which would automatically adjust attitude based on pilot input.

The simplest designs had no attitude control system at all. Instead the pilot would stand during the flight, and simply lean backwards, forwards or side-to-side to move the center of gravity relative to the center of thrust of the fixed engine. As a result, the offset thrust would cause the LESS to rotate until the astronaut returned to a neutral position and the center of gravity was again aligned with the engine thrust. Ultimately this was considered to be less desirable than hardware control, particularly as it imposed significant constraints on vehicle thrust level and inertia.

== Long-range flyer ==
While the LESS was designed primarily as a 'lifeboat' for the LM crew, a simple rocket which could carry two astronauts would be beneficial in other areas too. The Lunar Roving Vehicle allowed the astronauts to travel fairly quickly over a few miles, but an improved version of the LESS could allow rapid travel over much longer distances on rocket thrust.

By adding fixed legs, increasing structural strength to support landing stresses, supporting engine throttling or using a cluster of RCS engines that could be pulsed, and adding a long-range radio relay, the LESS design could be extended to become a long-range flyer (LRF). With around 1600 pounds of propellant from the LM, the astronauts could travel forty to sixty nautical miles from the LM to explore a wider area around the landing site. This would, for example, allow reconnaissance trips to potential future landing sites, and the LRF could also be used for orbital flight to return the crew to the CSM in an emergency.

=== Lunar Flying Unit ===
There were also studies for a Lunar Flying Unit (LFU). Bell Aerosystems Company and North American Rockwell (NAR) were both awarded NASA contracts in 1969. Bell's LFU had the pilot standing, NAR's LFU had a seat for the pilot. North American called it the Lunar Flying Vehicle, with a gross mass of 618 kg.

== See also ==
- Bell Pogo, a lunar flyer prototype, different than the long range flyer/Lunar Flying Unit
- MOOSE – Emergency bail out system to return astronaut from Earth orbit
- Paracone – Inflatable cone-shaped reentry vehicle.
- Personal Rescue Enclosure – Inflatable ball-shaped space suit

== Bibliography ==
- J.O. Mazenauer, Lunar Escape Systems (LESS) Feasibility Study — Summary Report, June 1970
- J.O. Mazenauer, Lunar Escape Systems (LESS) Feasibility Study — Final Technical Report, North American Rockwell, September 1970, 597 pages.
- George J. Hurt Jr, David B. Middleton, and Marion A. Wise, Development Of A Simulator For Studying Simplified Lunar Escape Systems, April 1971
- George J. Hurt Jr and David B. Middleton, Fixed-base Simulator Investigation Of Lightweight Vehicles For Lunar Escape To Orbit With Kinesthetic Attitude Control And Simplified Manual Guidance, June 1971
- David B. Middleton and George J. Hurt Jr, A Simulation Study Of Emergency Lunar Escape To Orbit Using Several Simplified Manual Guidance And Control Techniques, October 1971
