= HEAT 1X Tycho Brahe =

Danish suborbital rocket

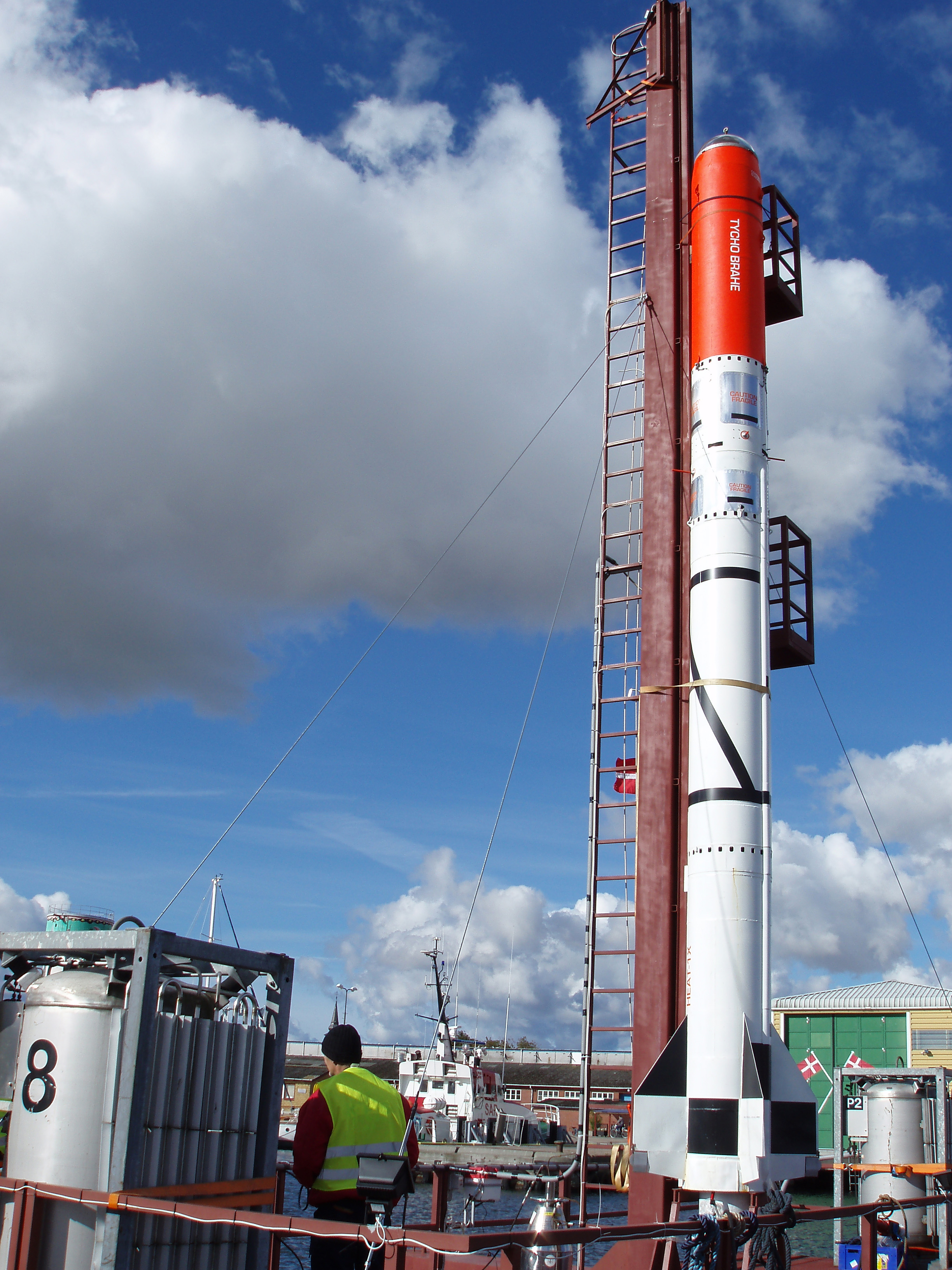
- HEAT 1X Tycho Brahe on the floating launchpad.
- Manufacturer: Copenhagen Suborbitals
- Country of origin: Denmark

Size
- Height: 9.38 metres (30.8 ft)
- Diameter: 64 centimetres (25 in)
- Stages: 1

Capacity

Payload to Suborbital
- Mass: One passenger/Crash test dummy

Launch history
- Status: Cancelled
- Launch sites: Nexø spaceport
- Total launches: 1
- Failure: 1

Boosters – HEAT 1X
- Propellant: LOX/Polyurethane

HEAT 1X Tycho Brahe was the first rocket and spacecraft combination built by Copenhagen Suborbitals, a Danish organization attempting to perform the first amateur suborbital human spaceflight.

The vehicle consisted of a booster named HEAT(Hybrid Exo Atmospheric Transporter)-1X and a spacecraft Tycho Brahe. Its launch location was a floating platform named Sputnik.

== Crew capsule ==
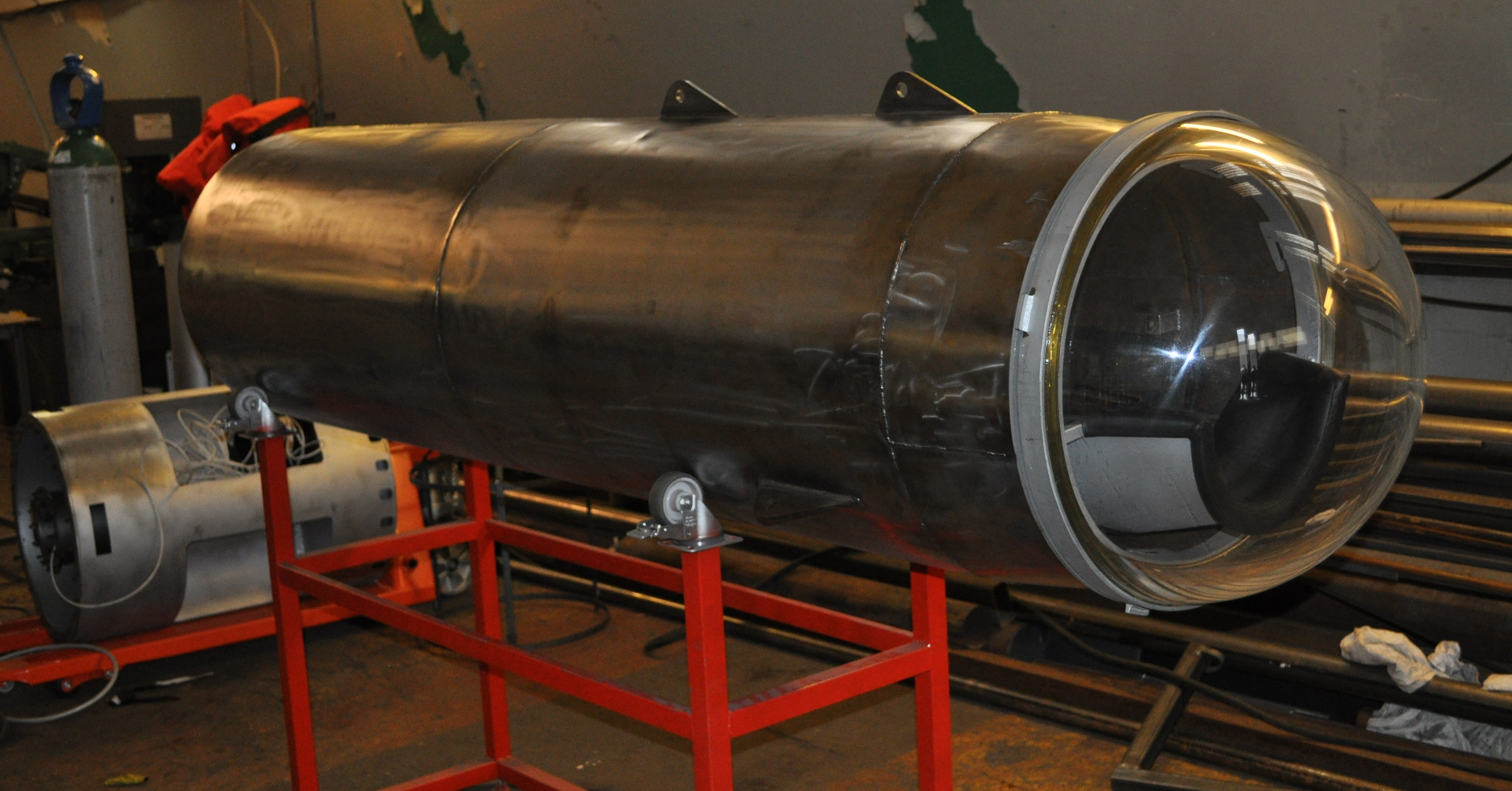
Tycho Brahe

The Micro Spacecraft (MSC) had a steel pressure hull, and room for one passenger designed and built by Kristian von Bengtson who co-founded Copenhagen Suborbitals.

The passenger was able to view the outside through a perspex dome. The occupant flew in a half-standing/half-sitting position, in order to decrease the diameter of the spacecraft. The passenger sat in a specially designed seat, and would have worn anti-G trousers to avoid blackout. The heat shield was made of floor cork. Life support would have consisted of CO_{2} scrubber derived from a diving rebreather and an O_{2} system.

Another compartment contained both the high-speed drogue parachute and the low-speed main parachutes for deceleration. The sheer volume of the MSC provided the buoyancy in the water. Pressurized nitrogen would have been used for attitude control. The attitude thrusters were part of the non-pressurized volume of the spacecraft.

The first MSC was christened "Tycho Brahe 1" and its first flight was uncrewed using a crash test dummy. The human-rated Tycho Brahe would have maintained the 640-mm diameter.

It was named after Tycho Brahe, a Danish nobleman known for his comprehensive planetary and astronomical observations.

== Rocket ==
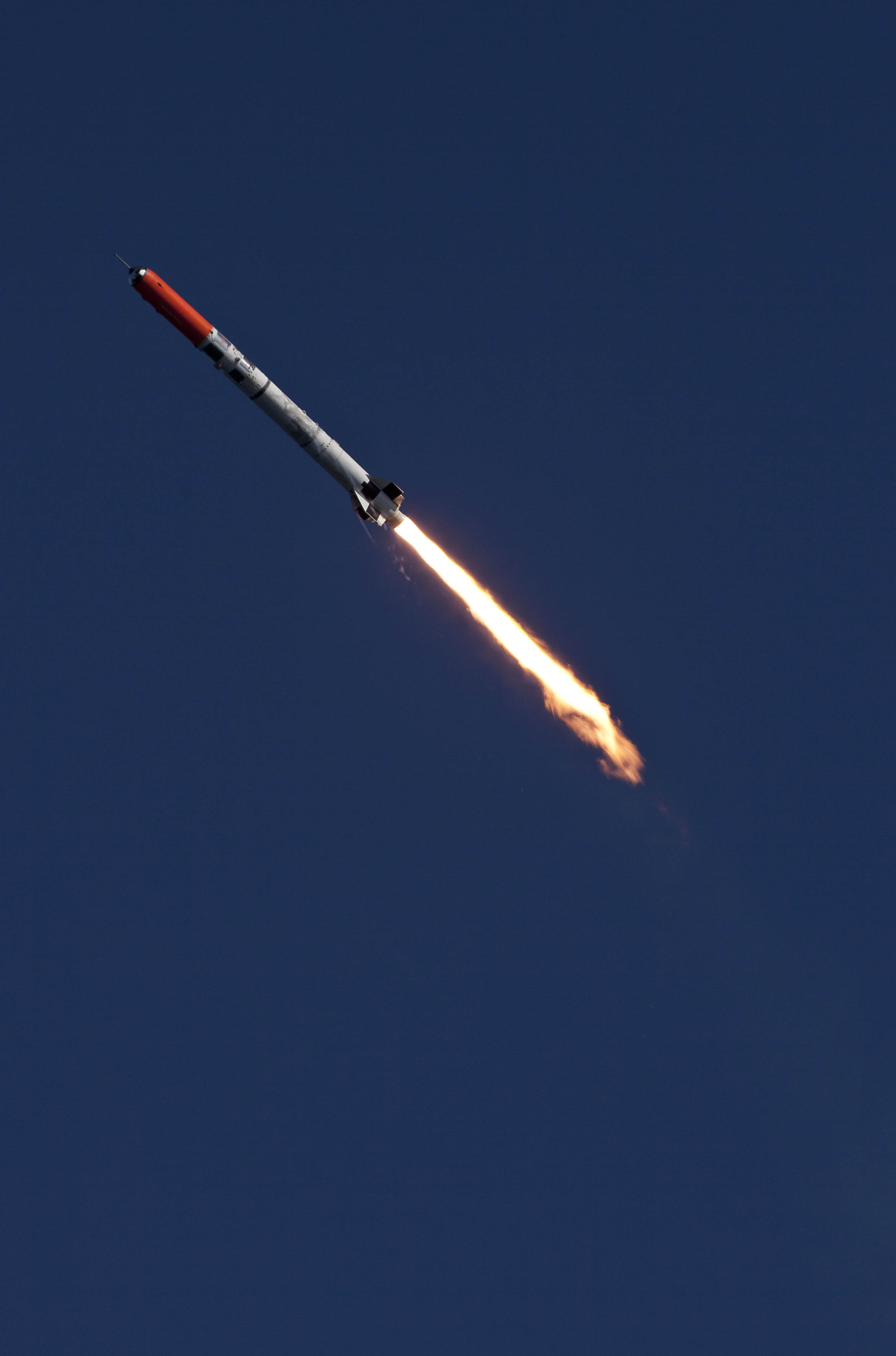
Tycho Brahe HEAT-1X-P in flight after first launch on 3 June 2011

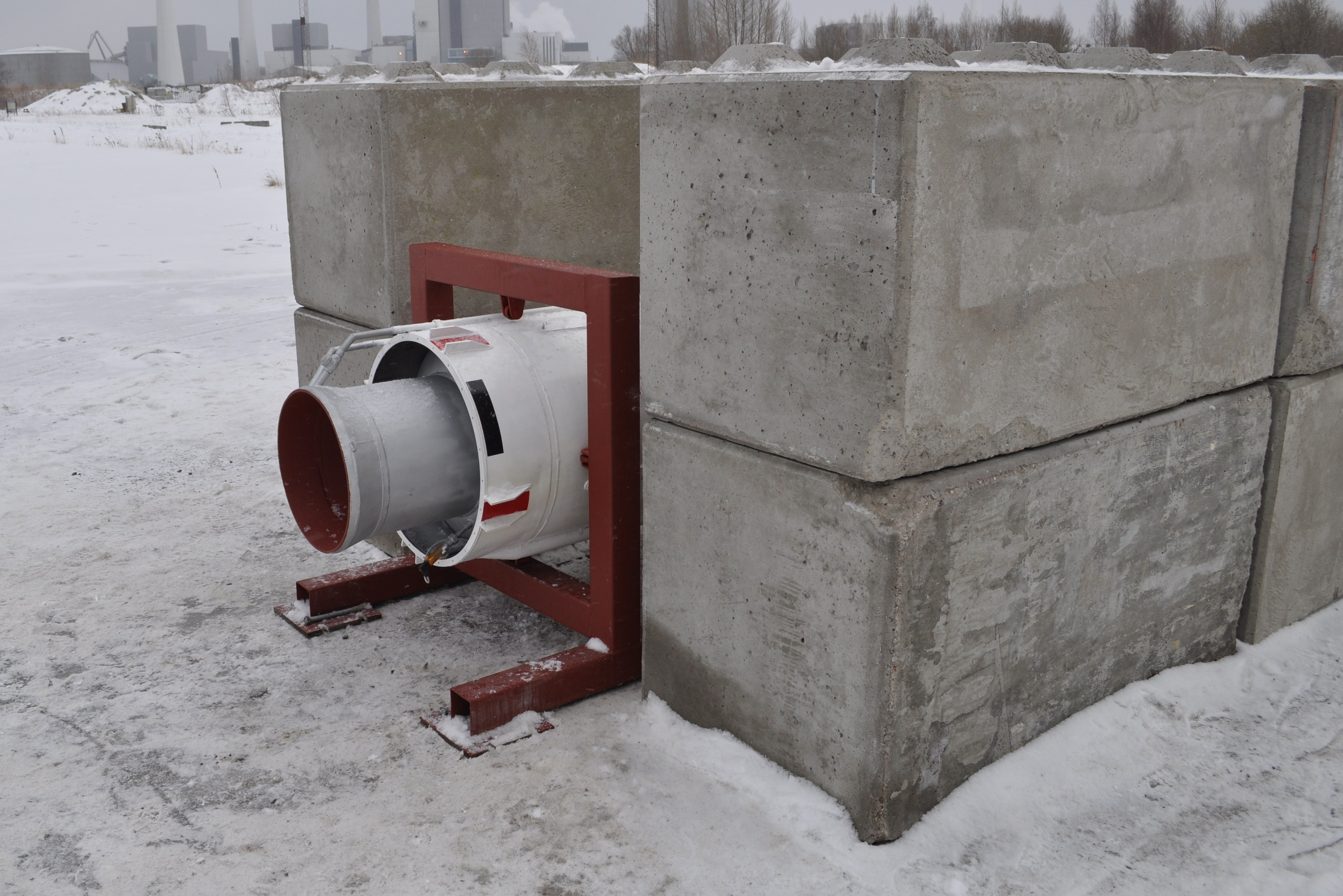
The engine nozzle of the HEAT-1X booster before a static fire test 28 February 2010.

HEAT (Hybrid Exo Atmospheric Transporter) with liquid oxygen and polyurethane, would carry the crew capsule above the 100 km boundary and into space.

The rocket development resulted in numerous booster tests resulting in epoxy as solid fuel and nitrous oxide as oxidizer, which was used in HEAT's Predecessor, HATV(Hybrid Atmospheric Test Vehicle). HATV was only 1/3 size of HEAT.

Gravity would then pull the crew capsule back to the atmosphere, where the capsule landed on water using parachutes. The first HATV rocket was tested on a stand on 8 March 2009.

Originally HEAT was to have been fueled with paraffin wax but a ground test 28 February 2010 revealed that some of the paraffin wax only melted, instead of evaporating. The result was that HEAT-1X had less power than expected.

A ground test firing of the Polyurethane-fueled version of HEAT, HEAT-1X-P (P for polyurethane) was conducted 16 May 2010.

The first version of the HEAT hybrid rocket booster, was built from ordinary construction steel, with the exception of the cryogenic liquid oxygen tank, which was made of AISI 304 stainless steel. The fuel was a polyurethane synthetic rubber, and the oxidizer was liquid oxygen. The oxygen was pressurized with helium gas. The booster was shut down by radio signal from earth. Total cost was around $50,000.

The heavy Lead-acid batteries that were used during Launch were not an issue, since the reliability of Lead-acid batteries was deemed more important than the lower weight of LiPo batteries. Four 12V 7Ah batteries were divided into two banks; two in parallel supplying 12V circuits redundantly, and two in series to supply the 24V Weibel radar transponder sending to a Continuous Wave radar on the deck of Hjortø. The combination of transmitter and radar meant that several objects could be tracked in motion as well as being stationary. The budget did not allow for an inertial measurement unit to compensate for ship movement, but an infrared camera on the radar allowed operators to track the rocket.

== Static rocket engine tests ==
Date	Engine type	Oxidizer	Fuel
2008-10-19	XLR-2	LN2O	Epoxy
2008-11-16	XLR-2	LN2O	Epoxy
2009-02-07	XLR-2	LN2O	Epoxy
2009-03-08	HATV	LN2O	Epoxy
2009-06-14	HATV	LN2O	Epoxy
2009-08-07	BabyHEAT	LOX	Paraffin wax
2009-09-04	BabyHEAT	LOX	Paraffin wax
2009-09-05	BabyHEAT	LOX	Paraffin wax
2009-09-05	BabyHEAT	LOX	Paraffin wax
2009-09-11	BabyHEAT	LOX	Paraffin wax
2009-09-11	BabyHEAT	LOX	Paraffin wax
2009-09-20	BabyHEAT	LOX	Paraffin wax
2009-10-17	HATV	LOX	Paraffin wax
2009-12-13	HATV	LOX	Paraffin wax
2010-02-28	HEAT-1X	LOX	Paraffin wax
2010-03-05	HATV	LOX (blowdown)
2010-03-20	HATV	LOX	Polyurethane
2010-05-16	HEAT-1XP	LOX	Polyurethane

== Offshore launch attempts ==
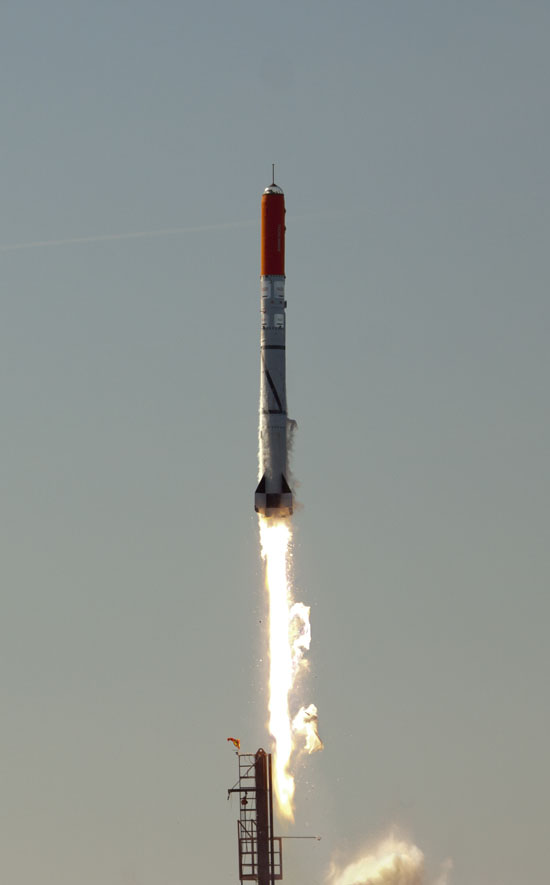
Testing on 3rd of June

The permission to launch was given by Danish authorities, but the first option, the North Sea, was a possibility that the Danish Civil Aviation Administration (Statens Luftfartsvæsen) opened, but it was rejected in 2009 by the Danish Maritime Authority (Søfartsstyrelsen). They preferred another area and then gave a formal and written permission to launch from a firing range in the Baltic Sea. Launches have been performed from a platform built for the purpose.

=== 2010 ===
The first full-scale test-launch to 30 kilometres (19 mi) was planned to be off the coast of Bornholm sometime between 30 August and 13 September 2010 depending on the weather. The launch carried a crash test dummy "Rescue Randy" instead of a human pilot, since crewed flight is still some years away. Success criterion was stated to be completing the sea voyage and counting down - launch and recovery being bonuses. On Tuesday 31 August 2010, the UC3 Nautilus pushed the launch platform Sputnik carrying the rocket and spacecraft from Copenhagen towards the launch area near Nexø, Bornholm. A launch attempt was made on Sunday 5 September 2010 14:43 CET, 12 UTC+02:00, but this was a failure due to a stuck LOX valve.

A test flight was attempted on 5 September 2010, using the HEAT-1X rocket. The vehicle on board launch platform Sputnik, sometimes pushed by homebuilt submarine UC3 Nautilus and sometimes towed by M/V Flora, moved from Copenhagen on Tuesday 31 August 2010 to Nexø on Wednesday 1 September 2010.

Launch was initiated Sunday 5 September 2010 from Home Guard vessel Hjortø at co-ordinates: 55°02′57″N 15°36′11″E

The oxygen tank was filled, and the rocket was nearing launch.

First attempt did not fire, attention was focused around oxygen valve and electronics. The oxygen valve jammed. It had not been tested, the previous one was stolen along with the oxygen tank at the construction yard in June 2010. The next launch attempt was pushed to June 2011, beyond the launch window ending 17 September 2010, because the rocket might have needed to be taken apart to check the LOX valve, and ignition rods and LOX needed to be replaced. Power to the hairdryer was supplied by Nautilus until the platform was evacuated, but the 20 minutes from then to launch drained the batteries and left the LOX valve unheated so it froze.

=== 2011 ===
The new launch attempt was on 3 June 2011. Hjortø was once again used for Mission Control. The submarine was left behind as the Sputnik had been outfitted with its own diesel engines during the winter 2010–11. After again experiencing a technical problem with the auto-sequence, the rocket and spacecraft went up in the air. After lift-off, HEAT 1X Tycho Brahe achieved supersonic speed but its flight path deviated from the vertical, so Mission Control had to shut the engine off after 21 seconds. Maximum altitude was estimated to 2.8 km and the ground track was 8.5 km. Booster and spacecraft separated but a parachute was torn off the booster due to excessive air drag. Tycho Brahe's parachutes didn't unfold correctly either, so the spacecraft received a large bulge at the 26 G impact. It is reported that it was water-filled when it was salvaged. The booster sank to a depth of 80–90 meters in the Baltic Sea A film of the launch from the pilot's point of view has been released.

== Goal ==
A crewed launch was at the time estimated to be 3–5 years away, but if successful, Denmark would be the fourth nation to independently launch humans into space, after the Soviet Union (Russia), the United States, and China.

== Related ==
In November 2010, an experimental liquid rocket engine called XLR-3B exploded during its 12th ground test. A similar liquid rocket named TM-65 Tordenskjold (Thunder Shield), after the Dano–Norwegian naval hero Peter Tordenskjold, with 65 kN thrust was constructed, however this design failed and caused a fire during its final static test in 2014. As of December 2014, work on a third design concept is underway at Copenhagen Suborbitals, while an alternative program more similar to HEAT-1X has been started by the original designer Peter Madsen.

== See also ==
- Single-person spacecraft
