= MOOSE =

Personal Space Ejection Mechanism

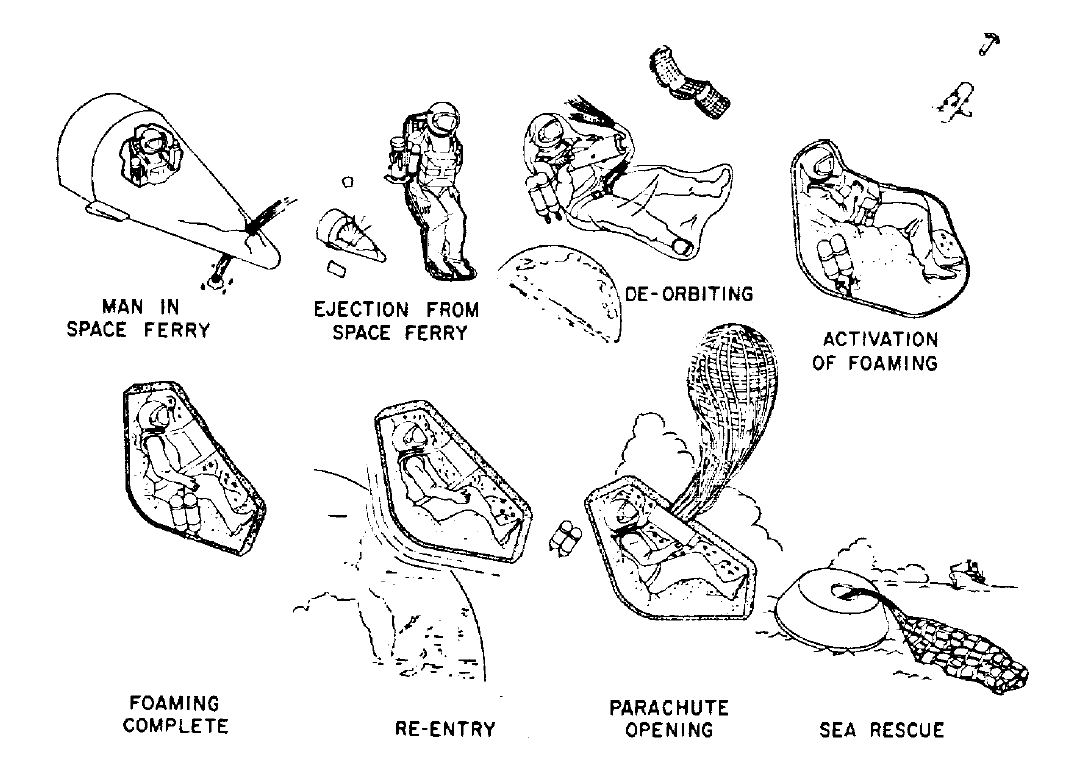
Fig. 110 from Analysis and Design of Space Vehicle Flight Control Systems

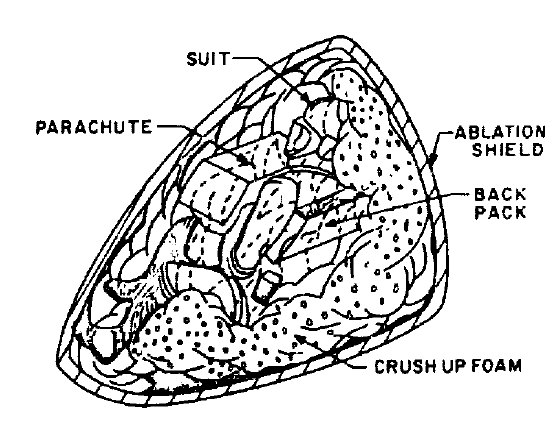
Fig. 111 from Analysis and Design of Space Vehicle Flight Control Systems

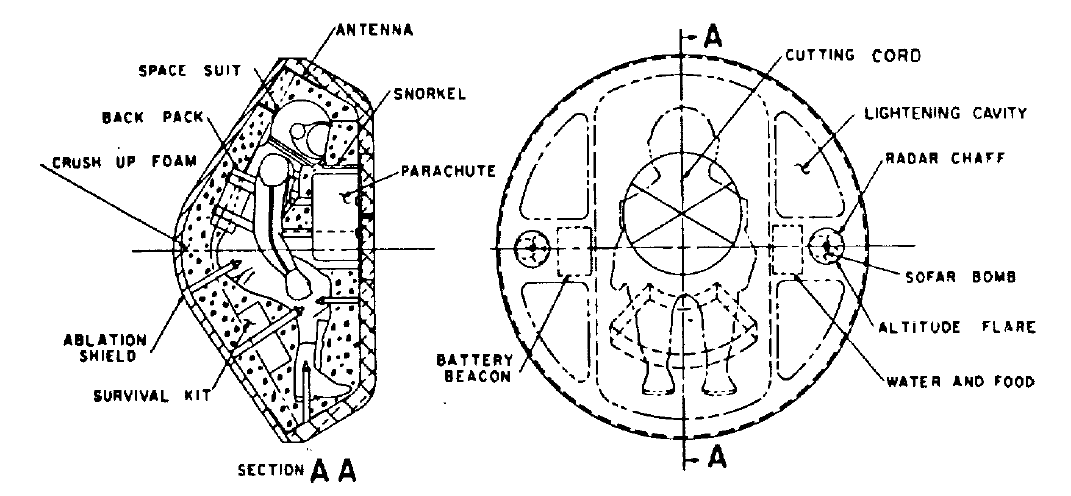
Fig. 112 from Analysis and Design of Space Vehicle Flight Control Systems

MOOSE, originally an acronym for Man Out Of Space Easiest but later changed to the more professional-sounding Manned Orbital Operations Safety Equipment, was a proposed emergency "bail-out" system capable of bringing a single astronaut safely down from Earth orbit to the planet's surface. The design was proposed by General Electric in the early 1960s. The system was quite compact, weighing 200 lb (91 kg) and fitting inside a suitcase-sized container. It consisted of a small twin-nozzle rocket motor sufficient to deorbit the astronaut, a PET film bag 6 ft (1.8 m) long with a flexible 0.25 in (6.4 mm) ablative heat shield on the back, two pressurized canisters to fill it with polyurethane foam, a parachute, radio equipment and a survival kit.

The astronaut would leave the vehicle in a space suit, climb inside the plastic bag, and then fill it with foam. The bag had the shape of a blunt cone, with the astronaut embedded in its base facing away from the apex of the cone. The rocket pack would protrude from the bag and be used to slow the astronaut's orbital speed enough so that they would reenter Earth's atmosphere, and the foam-filled bag would act as insulation during the subsequent aerobraking. Finally, once the astronaut had descended to 30,000 ft (9.1 km) where air was sufficiently dense, the parachute would automatically deploy and slow the astronaut's fall to 17 mph (7.6 m/s). The foam heat shield would serve a final role as cushioning when the astronaut touched down and as a flotation device should they land on water. The radio beacon would guide rescuers.

General Electric performed preliminary testing on some of the components of the MOOSE system, including flying samples of heat shield material on a Mercury mission, inflating a foam-filled bag with a human subject embedded inside, and test-dropping dummies and a human subject in MOOSE foam shields short distances. U.S. Air Force Capt. Joe Kittinger's historic freefall from a balloon at 103,000 ft (31,000 m) in August 1960 also helped demonstrate the feasibility of such extreme parachuting. However, the MOOSE system was nonetheless always intended as an extreme emergency measure when no other option for returning an astronaut to Earth existed; falling from orbit protected by nothing more than a spacesuit and a bag of foam was unlikely to ever become a particularly safe—or enticing—maneuver.

Neither NASA nor the U.S. Air Force expressed an interest in the MOOSE system, and so by the end of the 1960s the program had been quietly shelved.

== See also ==
- Paracone – Inflatable cone-shaped reentry vehicle.
- Personal Rescue Enclosure – Inflatable ball-shaped space suit
- Lunar Escape Systems – Proposed system to rescue Apollo astronauts from lunar surface
