= Simplified Aid For EVA Rescue =

Device used for untethered spacewalks during the Space Shuttle and ISS programs

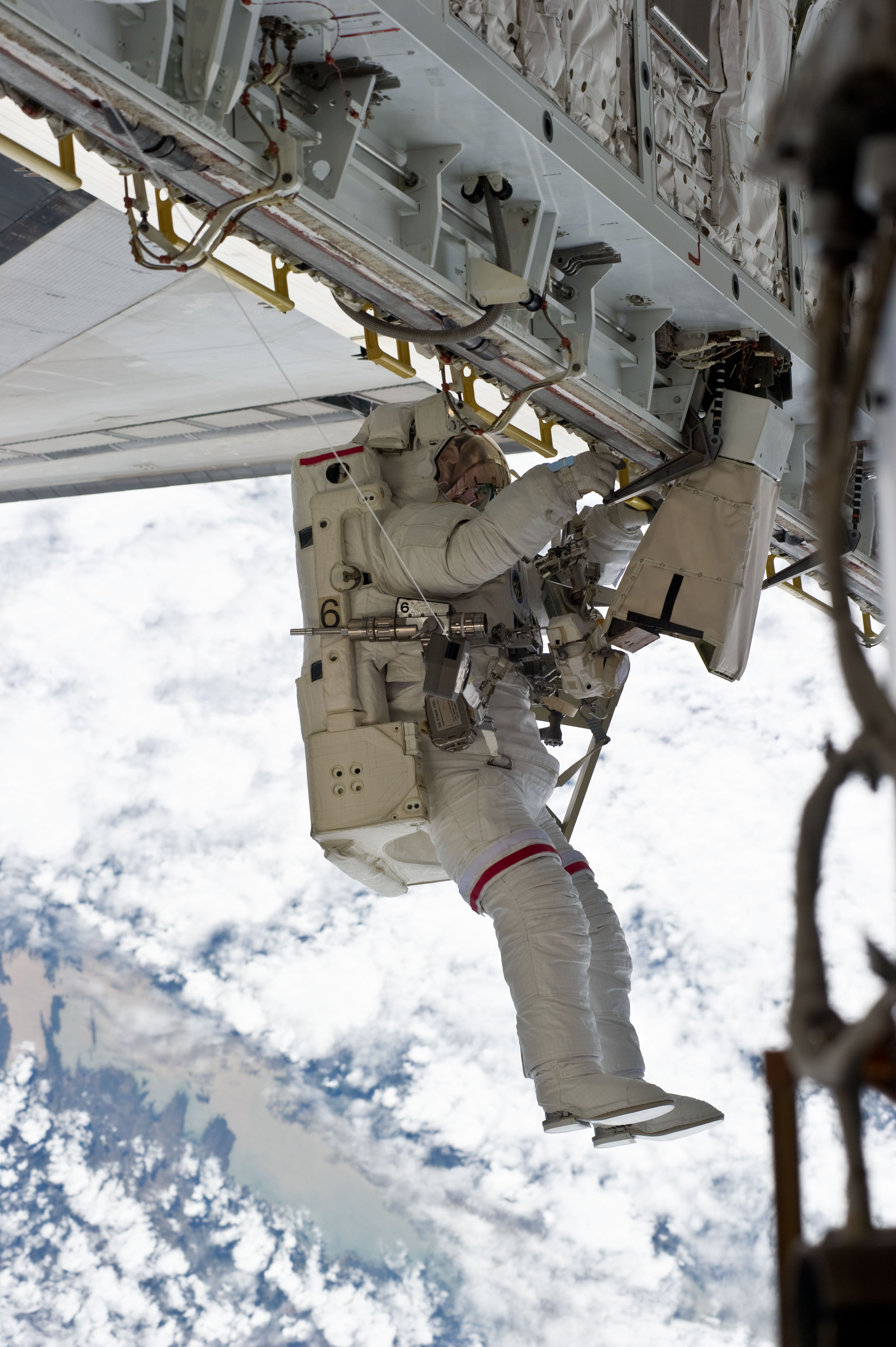
Astronaut Rick Mastracchio working with a SAFER system attached.

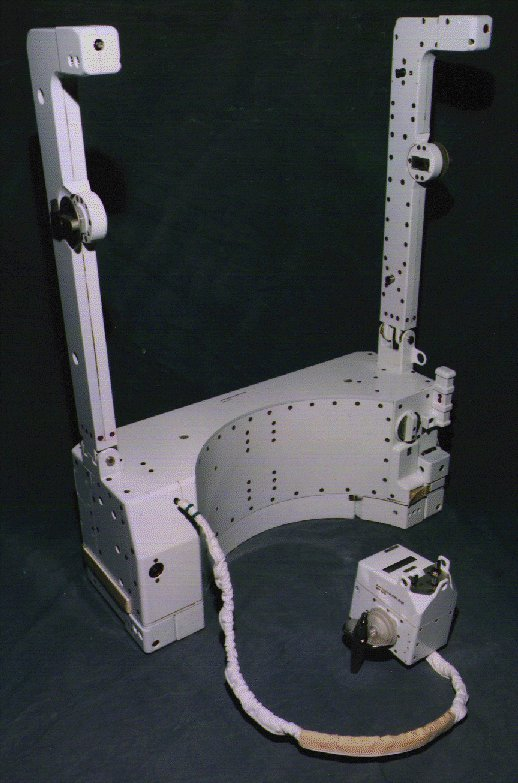
SAFER

Simplified Aid For EVA Rescue (SAFER) is a small, self-contained, propulsive backpack system (jet pack) worn during spacewalks, to be used in case of emergency. If an astronaut were to lose physical contact with their spacecraft during untethered walk, the backpack can provide free-flying movement to facilitate return. It is worn on spacewalks outside the International Space Station (ISS) and was worn on spacewalks outside the Space Shuttle. So far, there has not been an emergency in which it was needed. SAFER is a small, simplified version of the Manned Maneuvering Unit (MMU), which was used for regular maneuvering.

== Description ==
SAFER is fitted around the life support backpack (PLSS) of the space suit (EMU or Extravehicular Mobility Unit) using hardpoints, in the same manner as the MMU unit. SAFER in no way interferes with suit mobility. The flight test unit was fitted with a single hand control module rigidly attached to the Display and Control Module (DCM) in front of the suit. The hand controller provided six degrees-of-freedom (DOF) maneuvering via 24 gaseous-nitrogen (GN2) thrusters. Additionally SAFER is outfitted with an auto-pilot system designed to stop rotation and maintain orientation. The device weight is 37.7 kg (85 pounds), more than 114kg (250 lb) lighter than MMU. The GN2 is stored in four cylindrical tanks, compressed to 224 bar (3250 psi). Total fuel capacity is 1.4 kg (3 pounds), which is sufficient to change the vehicle velocity ΔV 3.05 m/s (10 feet/second). In addition to NASA's EMU space suits, SAFER was developed to be used with Russian Orlan space suits. The unit features very extensive self-test capability.

== Application ==
SAFER is designed to be used as a self-rescue device if in spite of precautions such as tethers, safety grips, and the robot arm, an EVA crewmember gets separated and no vehicles can provide rescue capability. SAFER is worn by every ISS crewmember using an Extravehicular Mobility Unit.

SAFER was co-invented by former astronauts Joseph Kerwin, Paul Cottingham and Ted Christian under a Lockheed contract to NASA for Space Station Freedom. It was later sponsored by the Space Shuttle Program and developed by Lockheed and NASA personnel. SAFER was the design solution to the Shuttle Program's requirement to provide a means of self rescue should an EVA crewmember become untethered during an EVA.

SAFER was first flown on STS-64 September 9, 1994, where an untethered flight test was performed first by astronaut Mark Lee and then Carl Meade. Both astronauts flew the SAFER up and around the Shuttle's Robotic Arm along with a demonstration test of the SAFER's automatic attitude hold feature. This feature arrests uncontrolled rotation of a detached crewmember expected in an accidental separation. SAFER has a mass of approximately 83 lb (38 kg) and can provide a total change in velocity (delta-v) of at least 10 ft/s (3 m/s). It was also tested during flight STS-92 when astronauts Peter Wisoff and Michael López-Alegría performed test maneuvers, flying up to 50 feet (15 m) while remaining tethered to the spacecraft.

== Complications ==
The left side latch on the SAFER unit became unlatched during an EVA by astronaut Piers Sellers on STS-121 while testing shuttle repair techniques. The latch had been inadvertently bumped and moved to the unlatch position. As a precaution, Mike Fossum tethered it to him and the spacewalk continued. In subsequent spacewalks, the latches were secured with Kapton tape, a space-rated form of adhesive tape, to prevent the latches from inadvertently opening.

== See also ==
- Single-person spacecraft
