= Paracone =

A paracone is a 1960s atmospheric reentry or spaceflight mission abort concept using an inflatable ballistic cone.

A notable feature of the paracone concept is that it facilitates an abort throughout the entire flight profile.

== Gallery ==
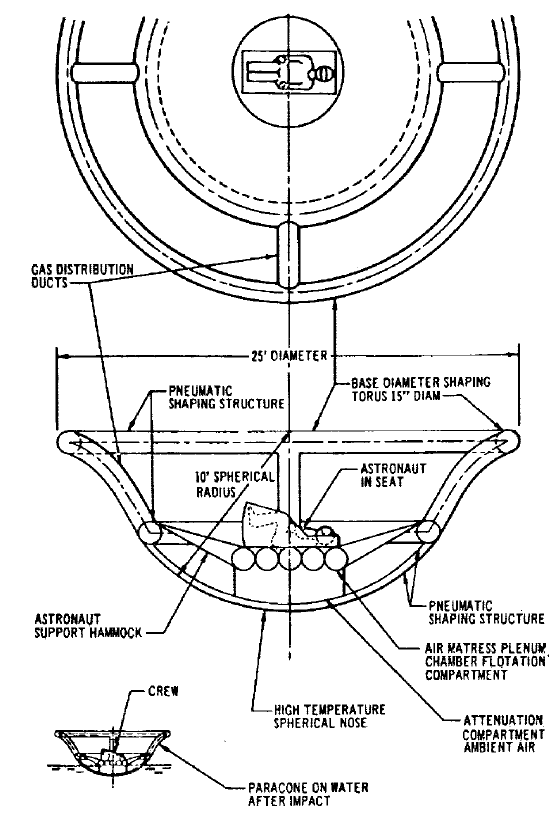
Paracone Configuration

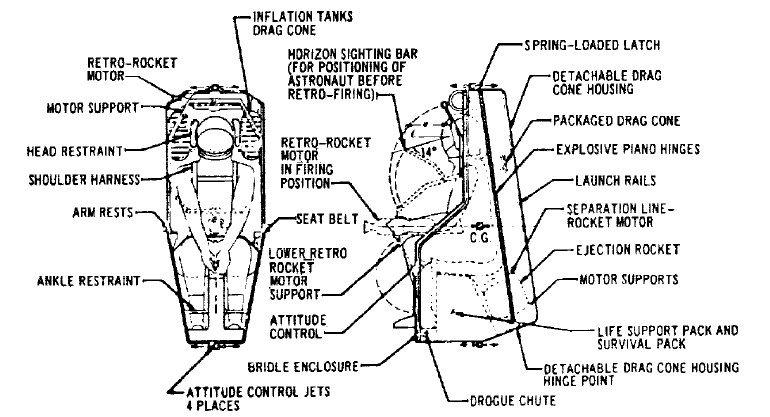
Paracone Survival Pack

== See also ==
- Space Shuttle abort modes, which do not include use of the paracone concept.
- Escape pod
- Escape crew capsule
- MOOSE
