= Kristian von Bengtson =

Danish architect

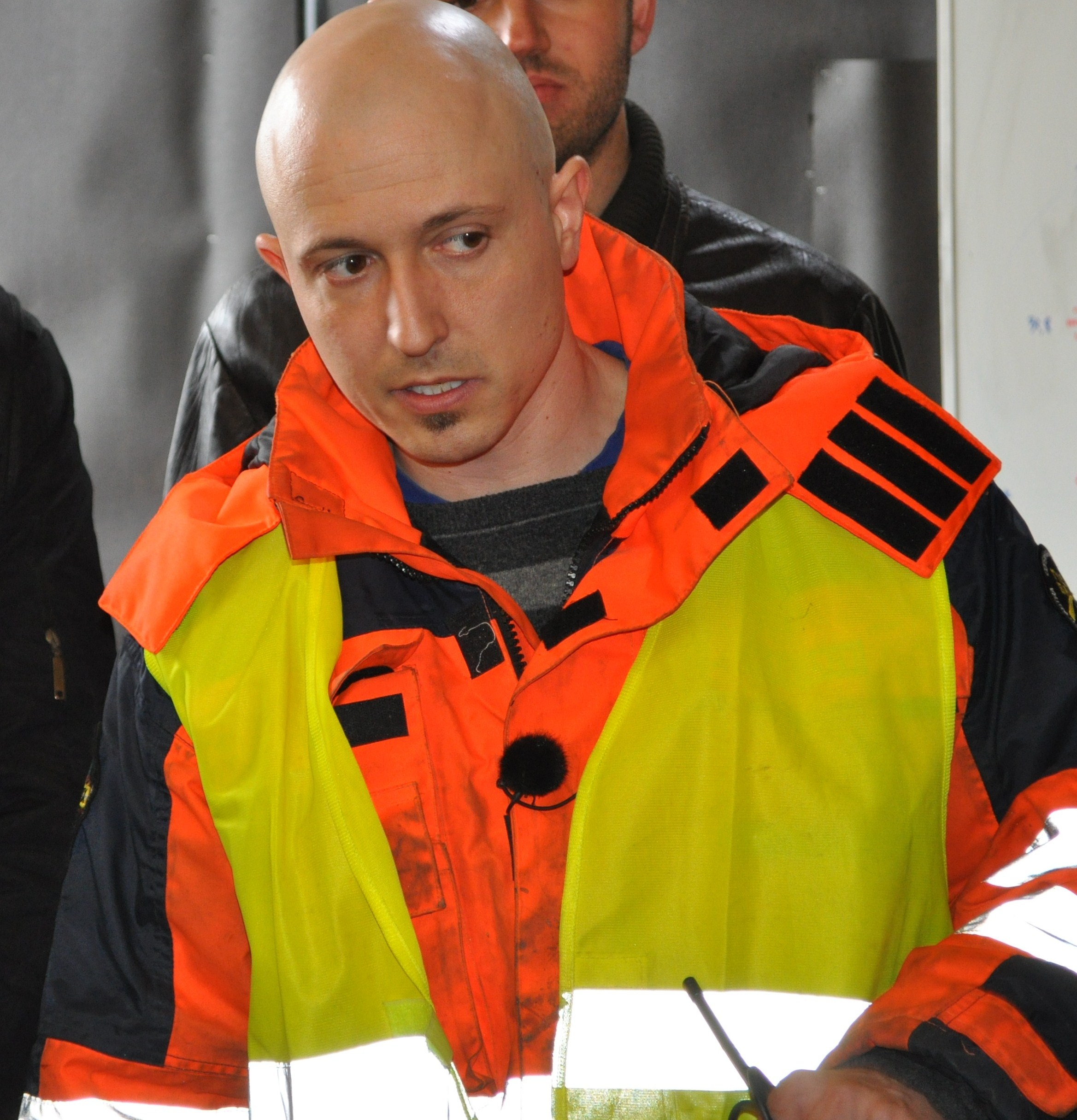
- Kristian von Bengtson sporting a yellow safety vest
- Occupation: Aerospace Engineering
- Years active: 2008–present
- Website: www.vonb.dk

Kristian von Bengtson (born August 1974) is a Danish architect, specializing in crewed spaceflight, a resident of Copenhagen and married to animation director Karla von Bengtson. He is most notable for his involvement in founding Copenhagen Suborbitals and European launcher company Orbex.

Kristian von Bengtson has participated in various space projects, simulated Mars habitation and is a trained architect from School of Architecture in Copenhagen 2001 and also has a master's degree in aerospace science from the International Space University ISU in Strasbourg, France (2006).

== Work on Copenhagen Suborbitals ==
On 1 May 2008 Kristian von Bengtson, along with Peter Madsen, founded Copenhagen Suborbitals. He was the lead spacecraft designer and functioning flight director until his departure in 2014.

== Work for Mars One ==
On 24 March 2014 Kristian von Bengtson joined Mars One as their Outpost and Capsule Project Manager. He resigned in May 2015.
