= Personal Rescue Enclosure =

Device for transporting astronauts between Space Shuttles in an emergency

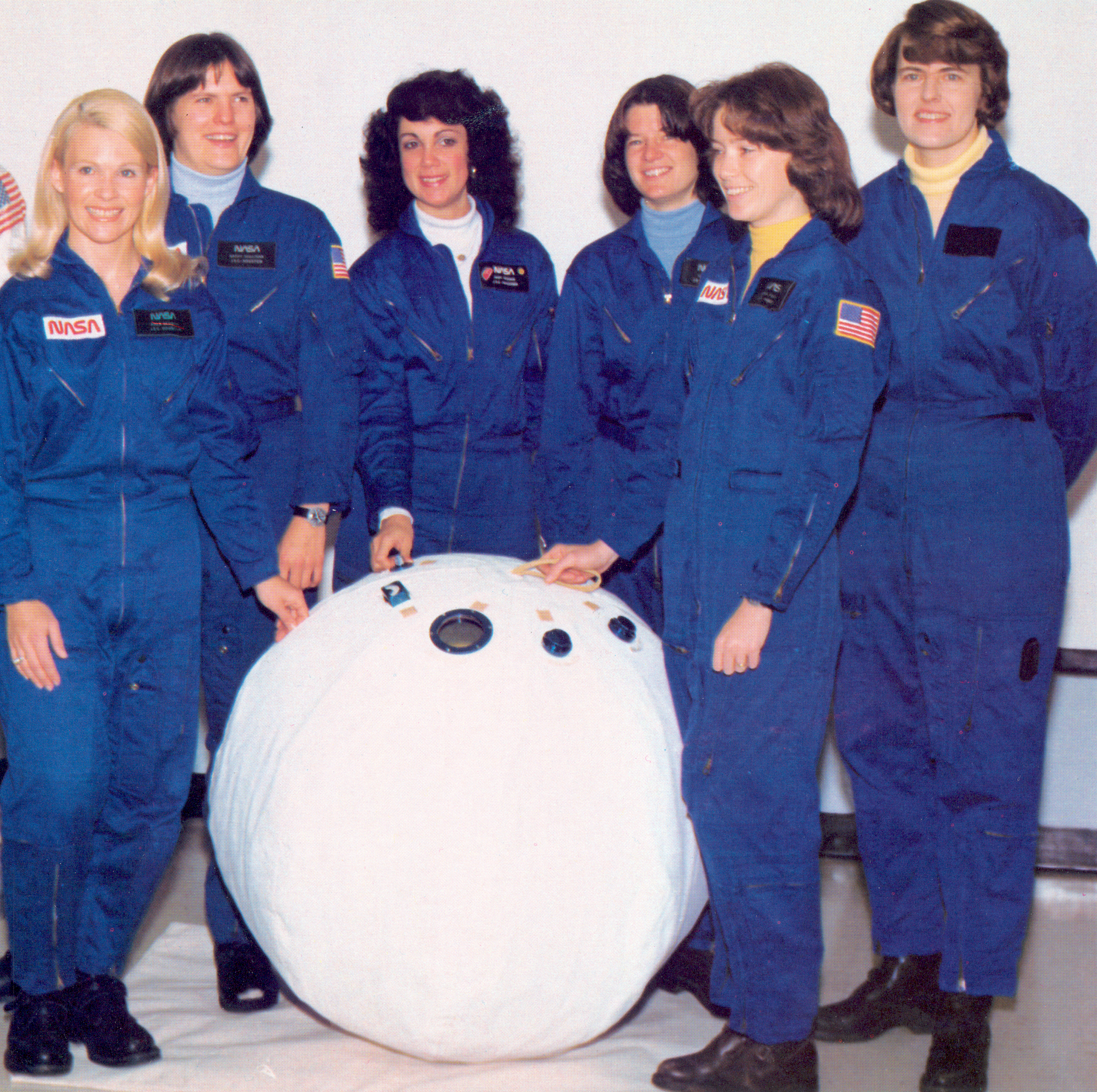
NASA's first women astronauts pose with the prototype personal rescue enclosure (rescue ball)

The personal rescue enclosure (PRE), or "rescue ball", was a device for transporting astronauts from one Space Shuttle to another in case of an emergency. It was produced as a prototype but never flew on any missions.

The ball was 36 inches (91 cm) in diameter and had a volume of 0.33 cubic meters (12 cubic feet). The structure comprised three fabric layers and incorporated a window and a zipper to allow the astronaut to enter and exit the ball. The ball enabled one crew member to curl up inside and don an oxygen mask and hold a carbon dioxide scrubber/oxygen supply device with one hour's worth of oxygen. The ball would have been connected by an umbilical to the shuttle to supply air until the airlock depressurized. The rescue ball containing the crew member would have been carried to the rescue shuttle by a space-suited astronaut.

The PRE was designed to protect humans in space in the event of an emergency where not enough full space suits were available. It was developed in the 1970s and 1980s to support the Space Shuttle program. The PRE was designed to be used in conjunction with a fully suited astronaut that would provide mobility to the person in the ball. The ball's life-support systems consisting of oxygen and a carbon dioxide scrubber could support a person for about an hour.

The life support system that supplied oxygen was called the Personal Oxygen Supply, or, alternatively, it could be supplied with oxygen from an external source after being sealed. The ball was made of fabric, and was sealed by way of zippers, with a small circular window to allow the occupant to see out.

NASA evaluated three methods of transporting the balls:

- By hand, a suited astronaut would haul the balls
- By robotic arm, a robotic manipulator arm would move the balls through space (see Canadarm)
- The balls would be attached to a line between two spaceships and pulled along like a clothesline.

Dimensions:

- 86-centimeter-diameter (2-foot-10-inch) sphere
- As a flexible not rigid item this figure would be subject to some variation, especially if not pressurized.
- Materials/construction methods
  - Fabric consisting of three layers
    - urethane
    - Kevlar
    - Thermal protective layer (outermost)
- Window constructed of Lexan

== See also ==
- Space suit
- Rescue Agreement
- Single-person spacecraft
- The Yes Men § New York Post and SurvivaBall
