= Skovlunde railway station =

Commuter railway station in Greater Copenhagen, Denmark

Skovlunde
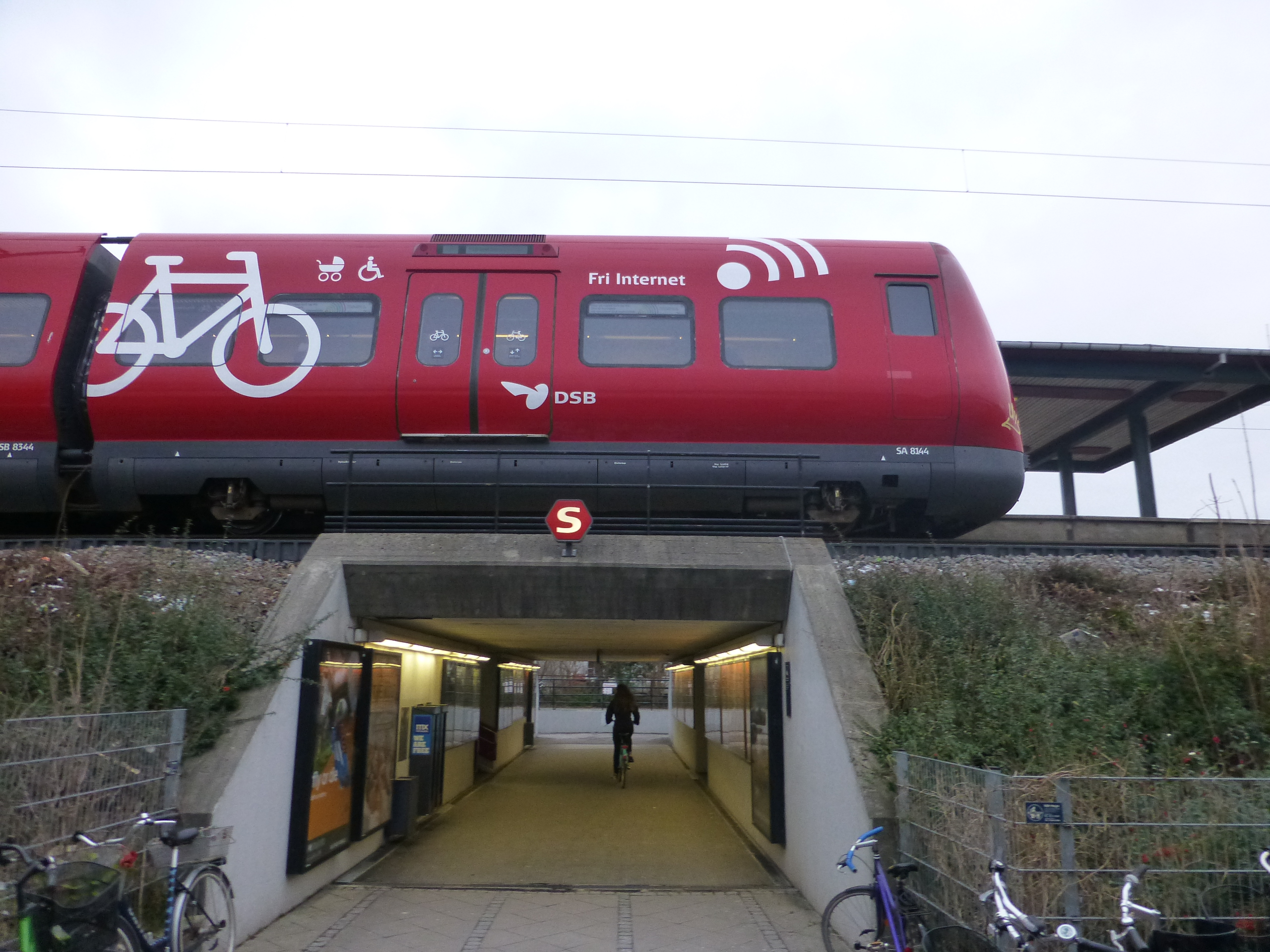
- Skovlunde station in 2014

General information
- Location: 4 Skovlunde Torv, 2740 Skovlunde; Ballerup Municipality; Denmark
- Coordinates: 55°43′23″N 12°24′11″E
- Elevation: 24.0 metres (78.7 ft)
- Owner: DSB (station infrastructure); Banedanmark (rail infrastructure)
- Platforms: 1 island platform
- Tracks: 2
- Train operators: DSB
- Bus routes: 142, 145, 834

Other information
- Station code: Sko
- Fare zone: 42

History
- Opened: 1882
- Rebuilt: 15 May 1949 (S-train)
- Electrified: 1949 (S-train)

Services
Preceding station	S-train	Following station
Herlev towards Klampenborg	C	Malmparken towards Frederikssund
Herlev towards Østerport	H Mon–Fri	Malmparken towards Ballerup
Location

Skovlunde station is a commuter railway station serving the suburb of Skovlunde west of Copenhagen, Denmark. It is located on the Frederikssund radial of Copenhagen's S-train network.

== See also ==
- List of Copenhagen S-train stations
- List of railway stations in Denmark
