= Islev railway station =

Railway station in Copenhagen, Denmark

Islev
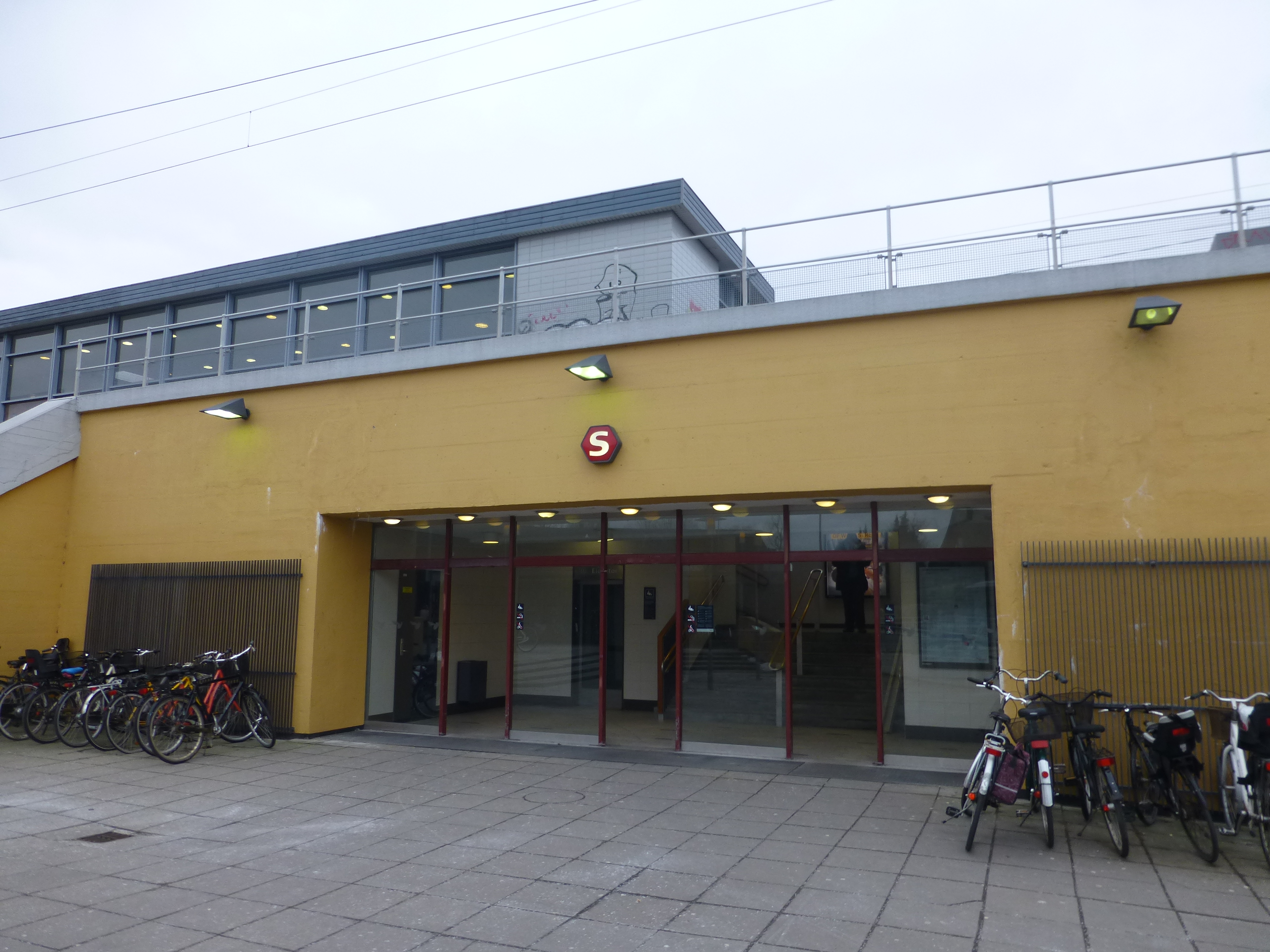
- Islev station in 2014

General information
- Location: Slotsherrensvej 137; 2720 Vanløse; Copenhagen Municipality; Denmark
- Coordinates: 55°41′56″N 12°28′09″E
- Elevation: 16.1 metres (53 ft)
- Owner: DSB (station infrastructure); Banedanmark (rail infrastructure)
- Platforms: 1 island platform
- Tracks: 2
- Train operators: DSB
- Bus routes: 12

Construction
- Structure type: Elevated
- Architect: Knud Tanggaard Seest (1965)

Other information
- Station code: Ist
- Fare zone: 2

History
- Opened: 1931
- Rebuilt: 15 May 1949; 77 years ago 1965

Services
Preceding station	S-train	Following station
Jyllingevej towards Østerport	H Mon–Fri	Husum towards Ballerup
Jyllingevej towards Klampenborg	C Sat–Sun	Husum towards Frederikssund
Location

Islev station is a commuter rail railway station serving the area of Islev in Copenhagen, Denmark. The station is located on the Frederikssund radial of Copenhagen's S-train network.

== See also ==
- List of Copenhagen S-train stations
- List of railway stations in Denmark
