= Jyllingevej railway station =

Commuter railway station in Copenhagen, Denmark

Jyllingevej
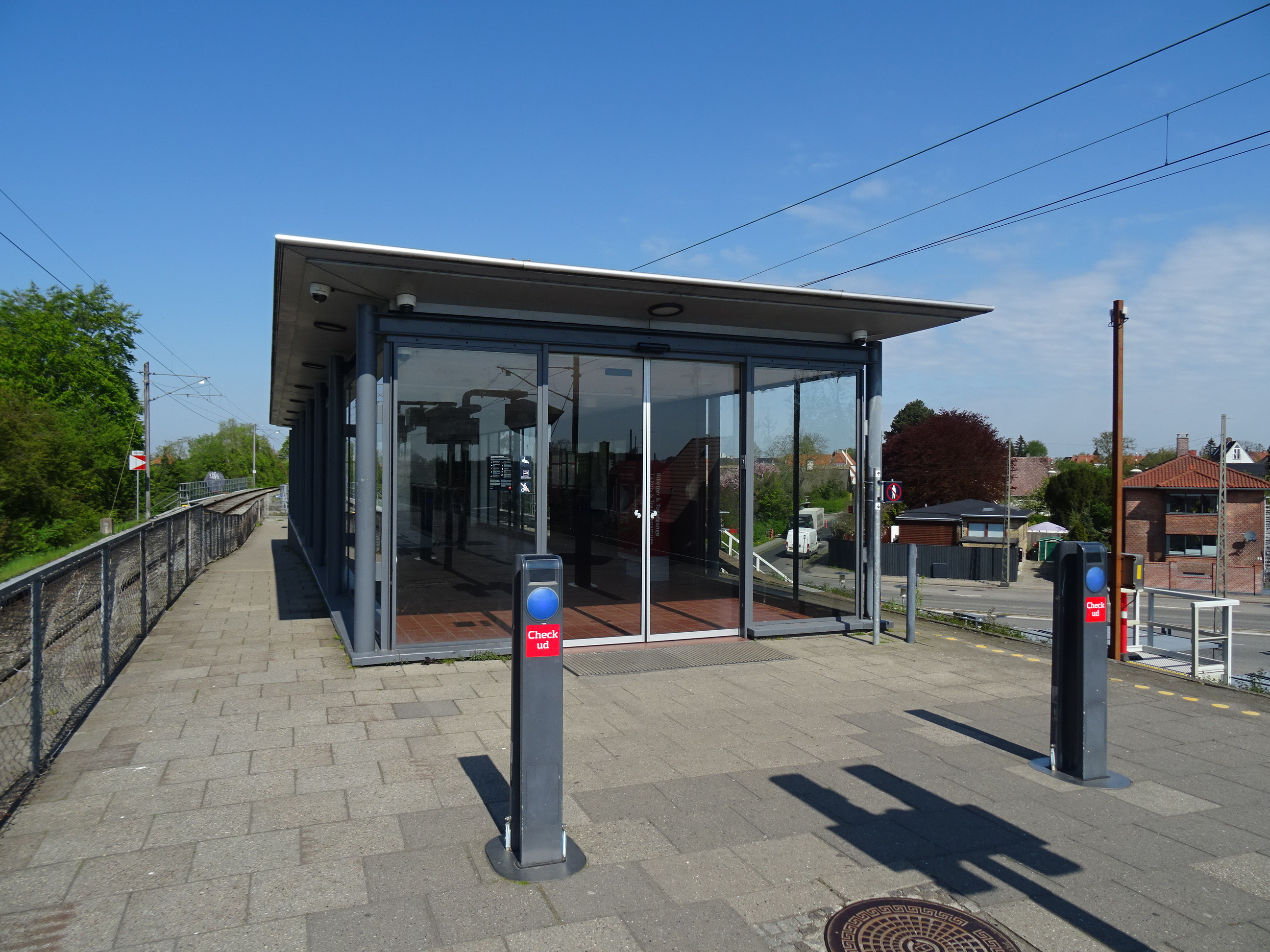

General information
- Location: Jyllingevej 91; 2720 Vanløse; Copenhagen Municipality; Denmark
- Coordinates: 55°41′27″N 12°28′37″E
- Elevation: 14.8 metres (49 ft)
- Owner: DSB (station infrastructure); Banedanmark (rail infrastructure)
- Platforms: 1 island platform
- Tracks: 2
- Train operators: DSB
- Bus routes: 12, 22, 31, 142, 9A

Construction
- Structure type: Elevated

Other information
- Station code: Jyt
- Fare zone: 2

History
- Opened: 15 May 1949; 77 years ago

Services
Preceding station	S-train	Following station
Vanløse towards Østerport	H Mon–Fri	Islev towards Ballerup
Vanløse towards Klampenborg	C Sat–Sun	Islev towards Frederikssund
Location

Jyllingevej station is a suburban rail railway station on the Frederikssund radial of the S-train network in Copenhagen, Denmark. It has its name from the road of the same name.

Jyllingevej Station was for many years one of the more primitively designed of the S-Bahn's stations. The station building was thus just a wooden shed; initially red, but in the late 1970s painted black as part of DSB's new overall design change. In 1995, the manually operated ticket sales closed, and in 2001 the original station building was demolished and replaced by a new and more up-to-date one of its kind, which can be seen below. On the same occasion, Jyllingevej Station - as the last of the S-Bahn's then 84 stations - was made handicap-friendly, as an elevator was installed deep inside the station building.

== See also ==
- List of Copenhagen S-train stations
- List of railway stations in Denmark
