= Husum railway station (Denmark) =

Commuter railway station in Copenhagen, Denmark

Husum
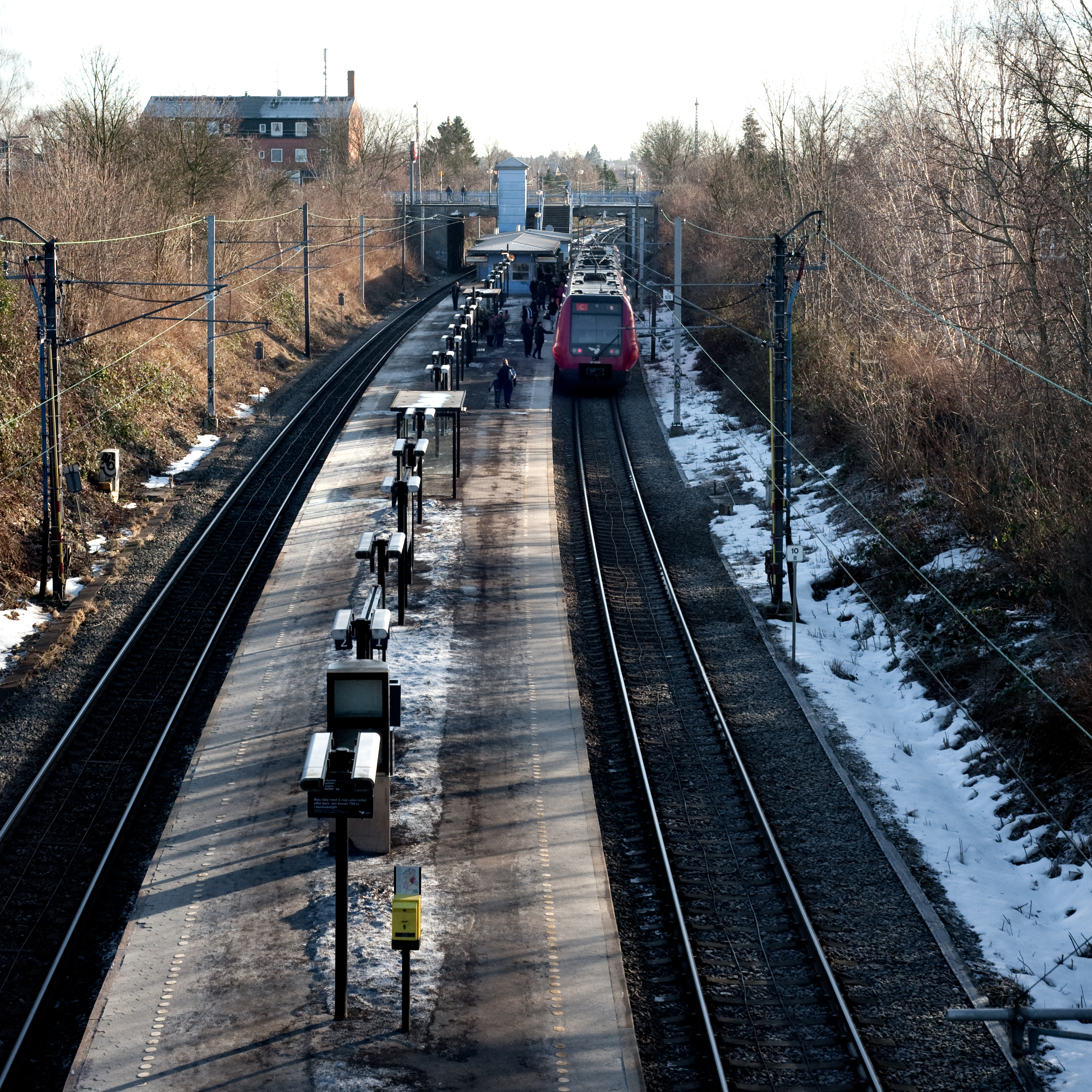
- Husum station in 2011

General information
- Location: Islevhusvej 40; 2700 Brønshøj; Copenhagen Municipality; Denmark
- Coordinates: 55°42′34″N 12°27′50″E
- Elevation: 14.2 metres (47 ft)
- Owner: DSB (station infrastructure); Banedanmark (rail infrastructure)
- Platforms: 1 island platform
- Tracks: 2
- Train operators: DSB
- Bus routes: 132, 166, 200S

Construction
- Accessible: Yes

Other information
- Station code: Hut
- Fare zone: 2

History
- Opened: 1880
- Rebuilt: 15 May 1949; 77 years ago (S-train)
- Electrified: 1949

Services
Preceding station	S-train	Following station
Vanløse towards Klampenborg	C	Herlev towards Frederikssund
Islev towards Klampenborg	C Sat–Sun	Herlev towards Frederikssund
Islev towards Østerport	H Mon–Fri	Herlev towards Ballerup
Location

Husum station is a station on the Frederikssund radial of the S-train network in Copenhagen, Denmark. It serves the area around the former village Husum, and is also the S-train station that is easiest to reach by bus from Mørkhøj in Gladsaxe and parts of northern Rødovre municipality.

== History ==
The station opened in 1880, shortly after the railway to Frederikssund opened. S-train service began on 15 May 1949.

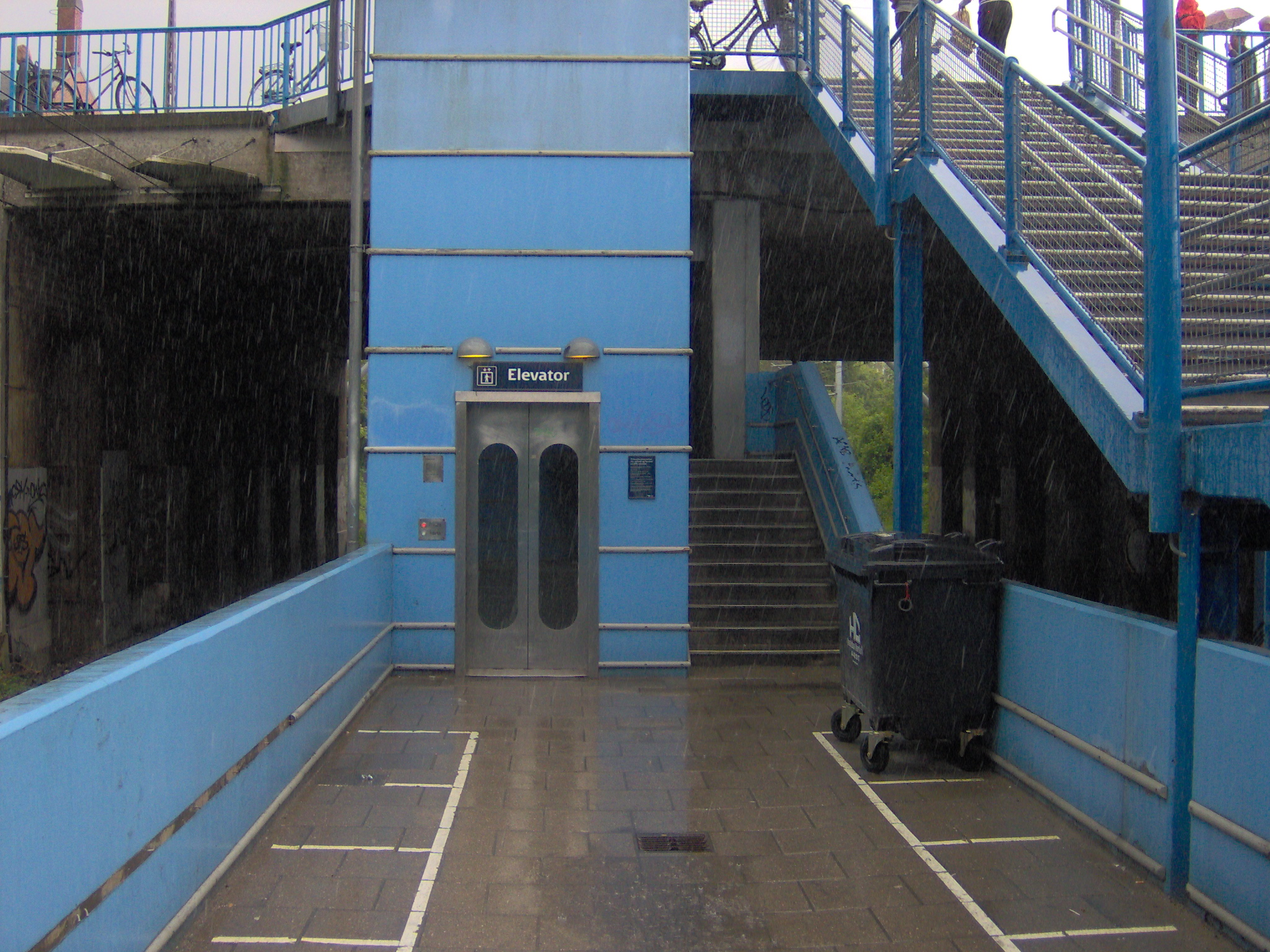
Elevator from the street down to platform level

== See also ==
- List of Copenhagen S-train stations
- List of railway stations in Denmark
- Transport in Copenhagen
