= Malmparken railway station =

Commuter railway station in Greater Copenhagen, Denmark

Malmparken
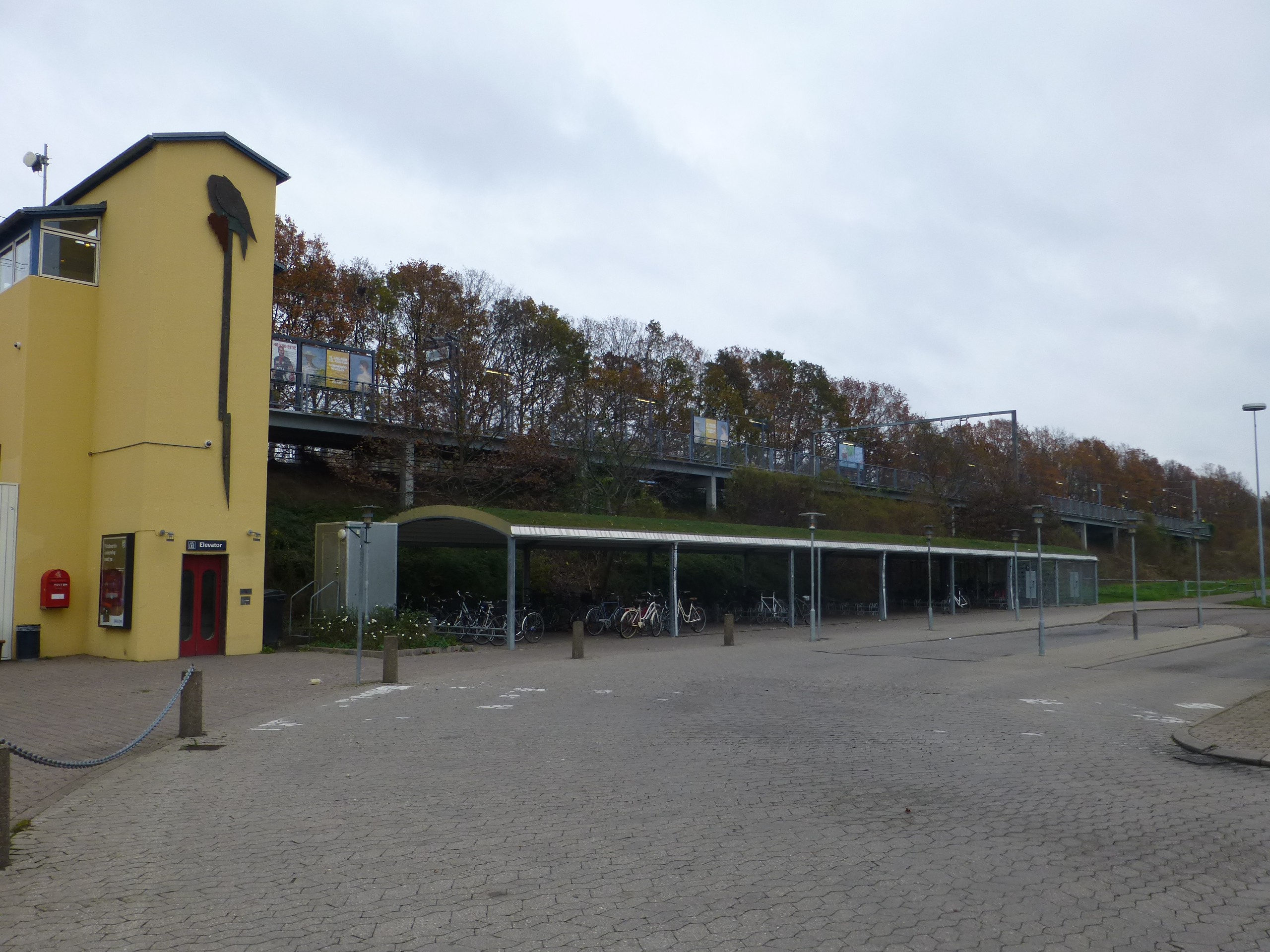
- Malmparken station in 2014

General information
- Location: Malmparken 10; 2750 Ballerup; Ballerup Municipality; Denmark
- Coordinates: 55°43′29″N 12°23′10″E
- Elevation: 24.6 metres (81 ft)
- Owner: DSB (station infrastructure); Banedanmark (rail infrastructure)
- Platforms: 2 side platforms
- Tracks: 2
- Train operators: DSB
- Bus routes: 350S, 40E, 55E, 834

Construction
- Structure type: Elevated

Other information
- Station code: Mpt
- Fare zone: 42

History
- Opened: 27 May 1989; 37 years ago

Services
Preceding station	S-train	Following station
Skovlunde towards Klampenborg	C	Ballerup towards Frederikssund
Skovlunde towards Østerport	H Mon–Fri	Ballerup Terminus
Location

Malmparken station is an S-train railway station serving the eastern part of the suburb of Ballerup northwest of Copenhagen, Denmark. The station is located on the Frederikssund radial of the S-train network in Copenhagen.

== See also ==
- List of Copenhagen S-train stations
- List of railway stations in Denmark
