= Herlev railway station =

Commuter railway station in Greater Copenhagen, Denmark

Herlev
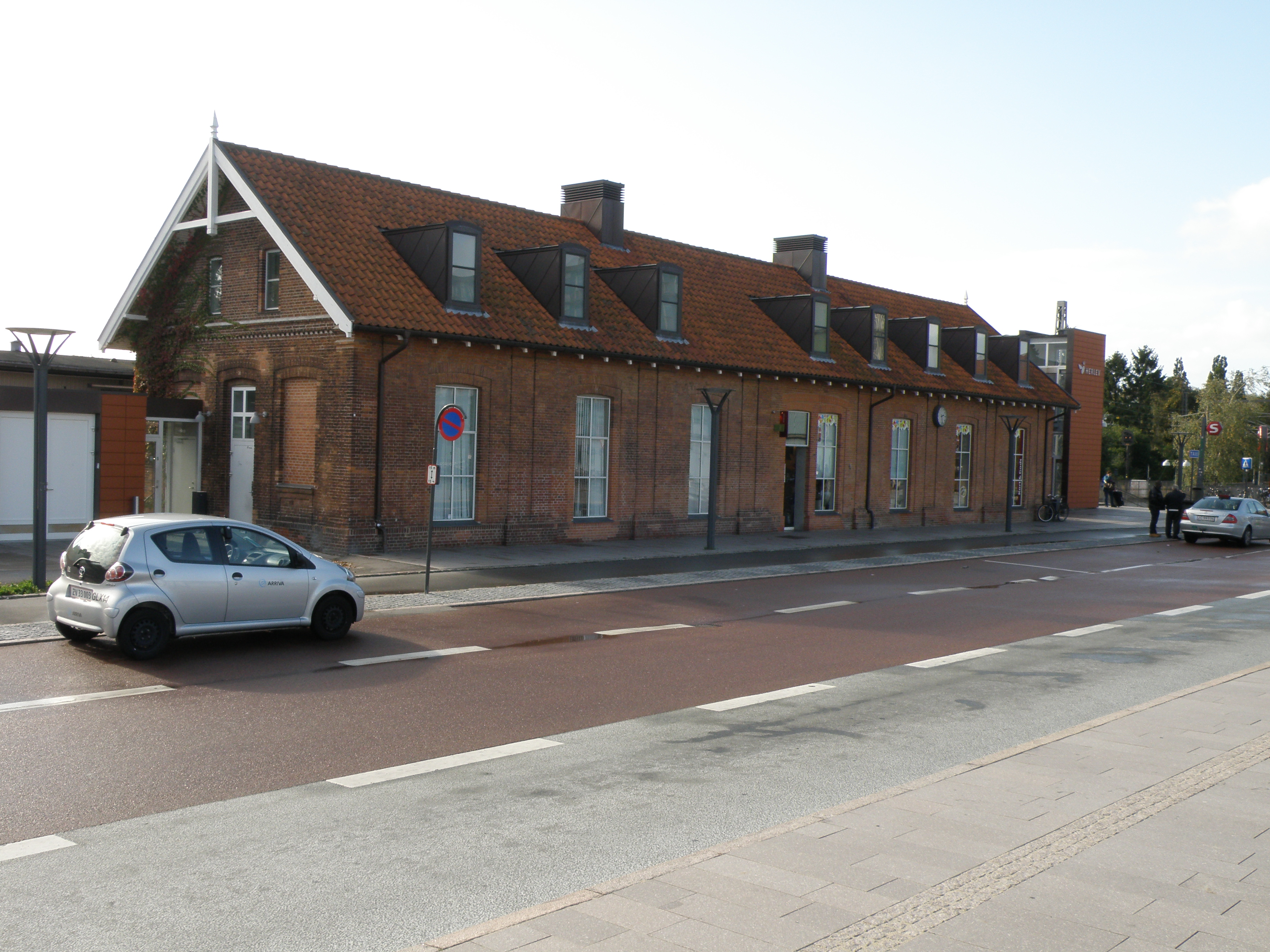
- Herlev station in 2009

General information
- Location: Stationsalleen 9; 2730 Herlev; Herlev Municipality; Denmark
- Coordinates: 55°43′08″N 12°26′37″E
- Elevation: 13.2 metres (43 ft)
- Owner: DSB (station infrastructure); Banedanmark (rail infrastructure)
- Platforms: 1 island platform
- Tracks: 2
- Train operators: DSB
- Bus routes: 165, 167, 168, 300S

Other information
- Station code: HER
- Fare zone: 31
- Website: Official website

History
- Opened: 17 June 1879; 147 years ago
- Rebuilt: 15 May 1949 (S-tog)
- Electrified: 1949

Services
Preceding station	S-train	Following station
Husum towards Klampenborg	C	Skovlunde towards Frederikssund
Husum towards Østerport	H Mon–Fri	Skovlunde towards Ballerup
Future services (2026)
Preceding station	Hovedstadens Letbane	Following station
Herlev Syd towards Ishøj	Greater Copenhagen Light Rail	Herlev Bymidte towards Lundtofte
Location

Herlev station is a suburban rail railway station serving the suburb of Herlev northwest of Copenhagen, Denmark. The station is located on the Frederikssund radial of Copenhagen's S-train network. It serves the central part of Herlev Municipality. Local busses from the bus terminal outside the station provide connections to remoter areas of the municipality.

== Operations ==
Herlev station is served regularly by trains on the C-line which operate between Frederikssund and Klampenborg, via Ballerup and central Copenhagen. On weekdays, the station is also typically served by trains on the H-line, which are in operation between the stations of Ballerup and Østerport in central Copenhagen.

== Bus Terminal ==
- 155 towards Herlev station (ring route)
- 165 towards Gladsaxe Terminal
- 167 towards Herlev station (ring route)
- 168 towards Herlev station (ring route)
- 161 towards Rødovre station

On Herlev Ringvej at the exit to the station, depart the ensuing buses:

- 300S towards Ishøj station/Glostrup station
- 300S towards Gl. Holte, Øverødvej/Lyngby station

On Herlev Hovedgade (Main Street), 400 metres (1,300 ft) from the station, are the following two stops:

- 5C towards Copenhagen Airport/Sundbyvester Plads; 350S towards Nørreport station
- 5C towards Herlev Hospital; 350S towards Ballerup station

== Light Rail station ==
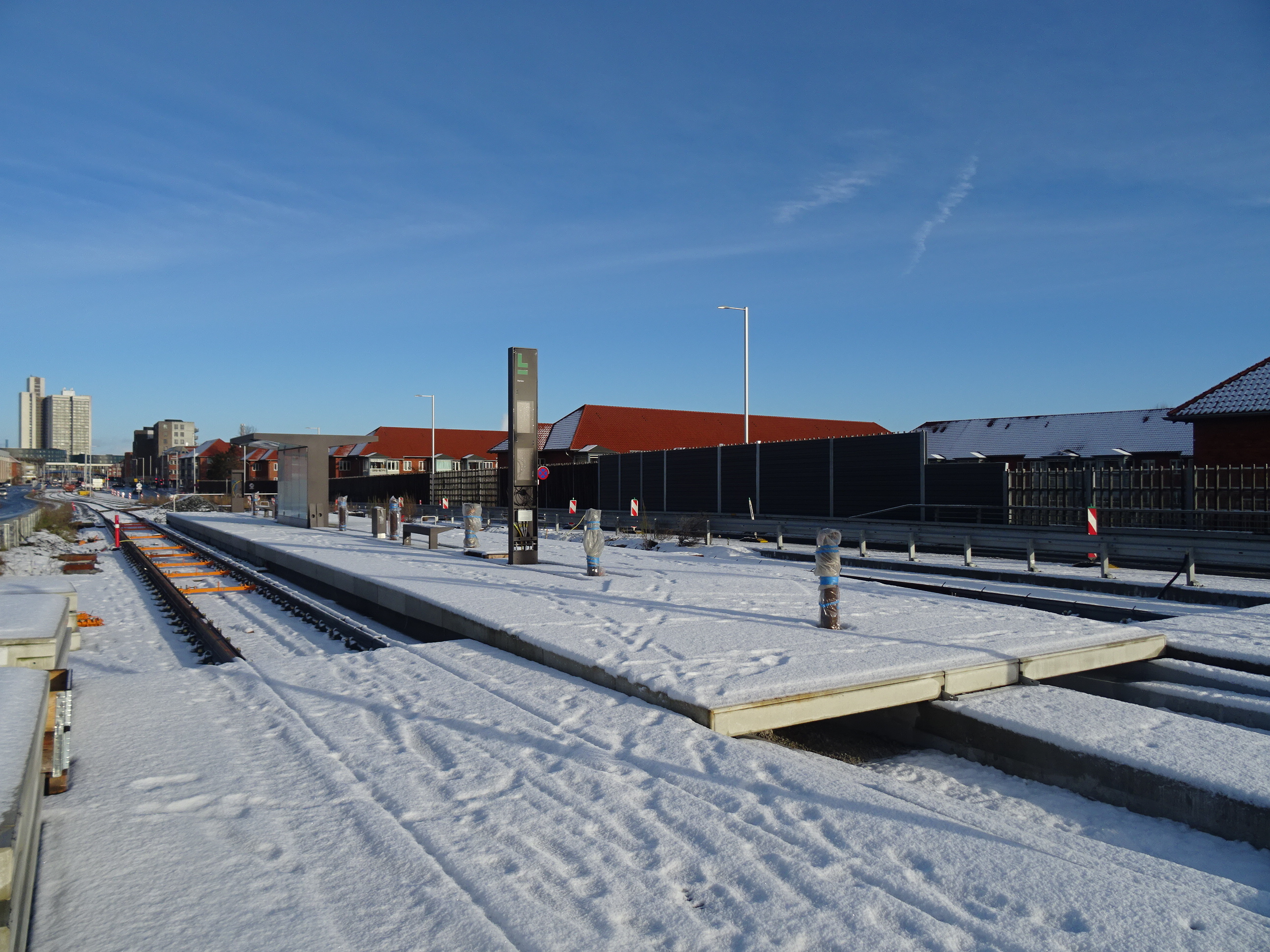
Herlev Light Rail station under construction in late 2024.

The Greater Copenhagen Light Rail will operate throughout the area, serving the station, as well as Downtown Herlev and Herlev Hospital, when construction is consummated in the summer of 2026. All the tracks have been laid, but there is still a lack of welds of rails in certain areas. Traction power will be installed in late autumn 2025; as of an update released in May 2025, only 35% of the traction power system was installed.

== Stations following towards Frederikssund ==
Frederikssundsbanen

- Skovlunde
- Malmparken
- Ballerup
- Måløv
- Kildedal
- Veksø
- Stenløse
- Egedal
- Ølstykke
- Vinge
- Frederikssund

== History ==
Herlev was one of the original stations on the Frederikssundsbane to be built, the station has now seen active (S-tog) train service since the 17th of June 1879.

== See also ==
- List of Copenhagen S-train stations
- List of railway stations in Denmark
