= Frederikssundbanen =

Railway line in Denmark

Coordinates: 55.7417°N 12.3306°E

Frederikssund Line

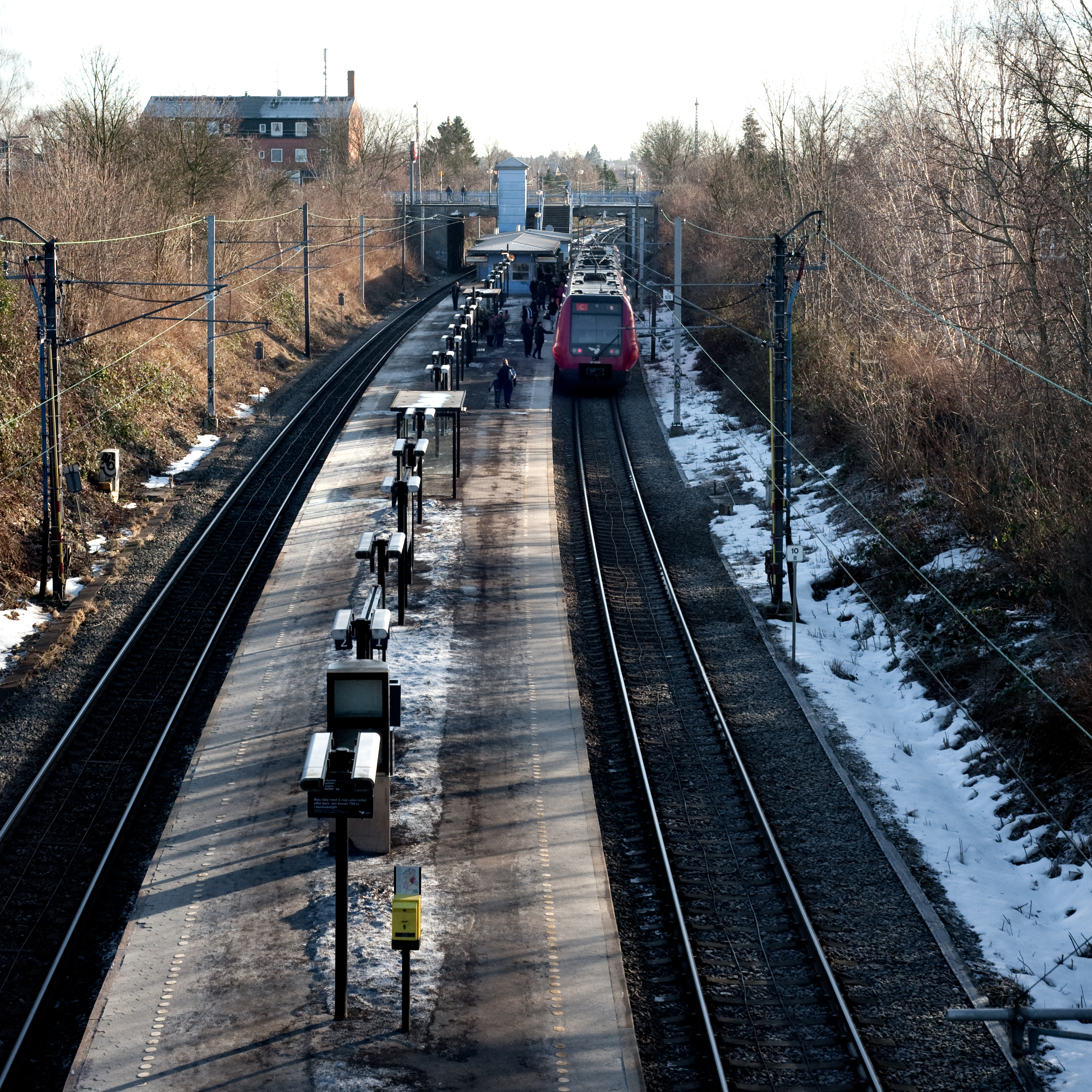
- The Frederikssund Line at Husum station in 2011

Overview
- Native name: Frederikssundbanen
- Owner: Banedanmark
- Line number: 830
- Locale: Greater Copenhagen and North Zealand
- Termini: Valby; Frederikssund
- Website: https://bane.dk

Service
- Type: Suburban rail
- System: Copenhagen S-train
- Operator(s): DSB
- Rolling stock: 4th generation S-train

Technical
- Number of tracks: 2
- Character: Grade-separated
- Track gauge: 1,435 mm (4 ft 8 1/2 in) standard gauge
- Electrification: 1,650 V DC overhead line
- Signalling: CBTC
Route map
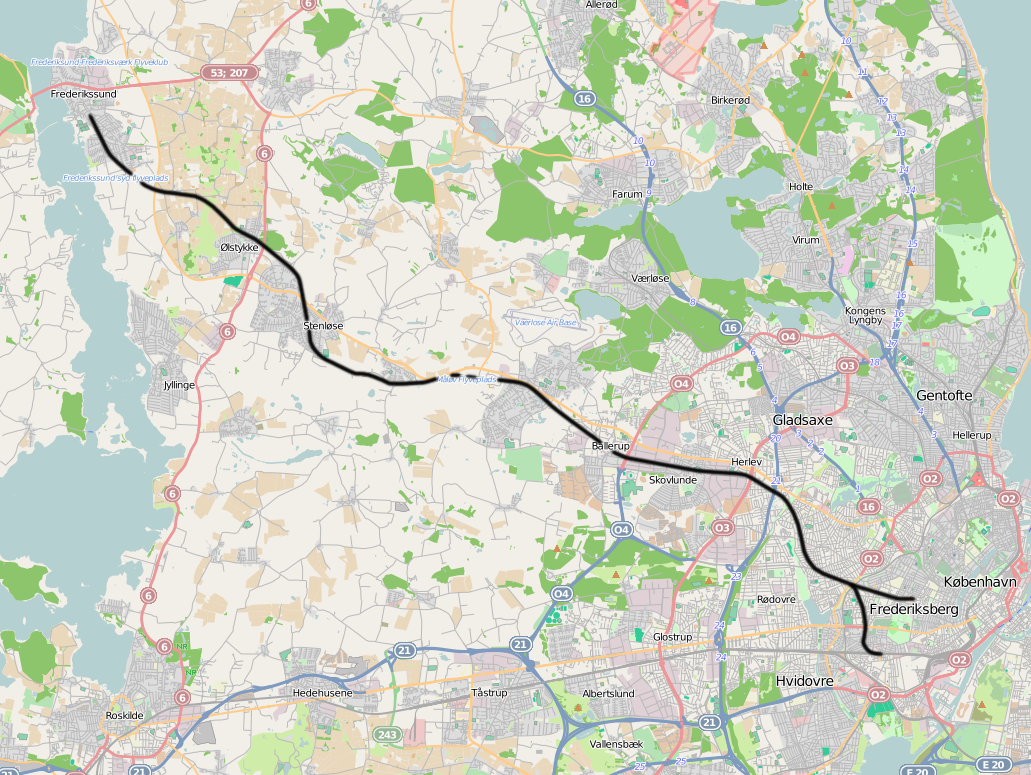
Map of the Frederikssund Line between Valby/Frederiksberg and Frederikssund

Frederikssundbanen is one of six radial S-train lines in Copenhagen; it connects the city center with a number of Northwestern suburbs (notably Herlev and Ballerup) and other townships until Frederikssund on the Western coast of the Nordsjælland peninsula.

== History ==
The Frederikssund line opened in 1879 as a single-track railway to Frederikssund from Frederiksberg, which at that time was a station on the main line between Copenhagen and Roskilde. In 1911 the main line was moved to connect to the new (current) central station, and the Frederikssund line inside Vanløse was replaced with a connecting line to Valby. The old line between Frederiksberg and Vanløse had a quiet existence until April 3, 1934, when it became part of the first S-train line. Much later this piece of railway metamorphosed again and became part of the Copenhagen metro.

Later in 1934 S-train service was extended westwards from København H until Valby, and in 1941 the section Valby-Vanløse was upgraded to double track and S-train service too. Passengers to stations farther out would ride the S-train to Vanløse and change to steam trains (later diesel) there. In 1949 S-train service was extended to Ballerup, and at the same time the line was double-tracked as far as Herlev. A second track between Herlev and Ballerup was built 1966-1970.

The diesel trains at the outer end of the line were finally replaced by S-trains in 1989. At this time, the line's terminus in Frederikssund was restored to its original central location. It had been moved nearer to the harbour in 1928 in order to connect to the short-lived central Zealand railway and kept its new, somewhat remote, location for more than 50 years after the central Zealand railway closed again in 1936.

After the 1989 electrification, the line beyond Ballerup was kept as a single-track line. Uniquely for an S-train line, several level crossings were retained after the electrification of the Ballerup-Frederikssund part. With fixed train crossings in Veksø and Ølstykke the single track could sustain three trains an hour in each direction, which quickly proved inadequate to keep up with the traffic demands. It took several years before funding for an upgrade could be secured, but a second track between Ballerup and Frederikssund was eventually built as far as Veksø in 2000 and all the way to Frederikssund in 2002. As soon as the new track was ready, the service frequency was doubled to six trains an hour. The double track also allowed new stations to be opened at Kildedal and Gammel Toftegård.

== Stations ==
Name	Services	Opened	S-trains	Comments
Østerport	C, H	August 2, 1897	May 15, 1934	Also all other radials; named Østerbro until 1934. Service H terminates.
Nørreport	C, H	July 1, 1918	May 15, 1934	Also all other radials; transfer to metro; bus terminal; cross-link express buses 150S and 350S
Vesterport	C, H	May 15, 1934		Also all other radials
København H	C, H	November 30, 1911	May 15, 1934	Central station; also all other radials; bus terminal; cross-link express bus 250S
Dybbølsbro	C, H	November 1, 1934		Also Køge and Tåstrup radials
Carlsberg	C, H	November 30, 1911	November 1, 1934	Also Tåstrup radial; named Vester Fælledvej until 1923
Valby	C, H	November 30, 1911	November 1, 1934	Also Tåstrup radial; transfer to regional trains
Langgade	C	September 23, 1941		Named Valby Langgade until 1946
Peter Bangs Vej	C	September 23, 1941		
Flintholm	C, H	January 24, 2004		Transfer to ring line; metro
Vanløse	C, H	June 15, 1898	September 23, 1941	Transfer to metro; S-trains on ring line 3 April 1934 – 2002
Jyllingevej	C	May 15, 1949		
Islev	C	1931	May 15, 1949	
Husum	C, H	1880	May 15, 1949	Cross-link express bus 200S
Herlev	C, H	June 17, 1879	May 15, 1949	Bus terminal; cross-link express buses 300S and 350S
Skovlunde	C	1882	May 15, 1949	
Malmparken	C, H	May 27, 1989		Cross-link express bus 350S
Ballerup	C, H	June 17, 1879	May 15, 1949	Basic C service terminates; major bus terminal; cross-link express buses 350S, 400S and 500S
Måløv	(C), H	June 17, 1879	May 28, 1989	
Kildedal	(C)	November 25, 2000		
Veksø	(C), H	June 17, 1879	May 28, 1989	
Stenløse	(C), H	February 18, 1882	May 28, 1989	
Gammel Toftegård	(C), H	September 14, 2002		
Ølstykke	(C), H	June 17, 1879	May 28, 1989	Cross-link express bus 600S
Vinge	H	2020	—	Closed 1989-2020
Frederikssund	(C), H	June 17, 1879	May 28, 1989	Major bus terminal

== Service patterns ==
The service pattern on the inner part of the line is the C service which stops at all stations until Ballerup. On the outer part the basic service is H, which runs partially non-stop until Ballerup. The H service is peculiar in that its frequency is not doubled during daylight hours, as all other basic S-train services are. Instead, in the period where C is doubled, half of its trains continue to Frederikssund, providing 6 trains per hour in total on the outer part of the line, too. This daylight-only extension is indicated as "(C)" in the above table.

Kildedal station is the only officially existing station on the S-train network that is not served for the entire service period, as the only trains that stop there are the daylight C extension. After about 19.00 and on Sundays no trains stop at Kildedal.

== See also ==
- List of Copenhagen S-train lines
- Transportation in Copenhagen
- List of railway lines in Denmark
- Rail transport in Denmark
- Transportation in Denmark
- History of rail transport in Denmark
- S-train (Copenhagen)
- Banedanmark
