= Skovlunde =

Town in Denmark

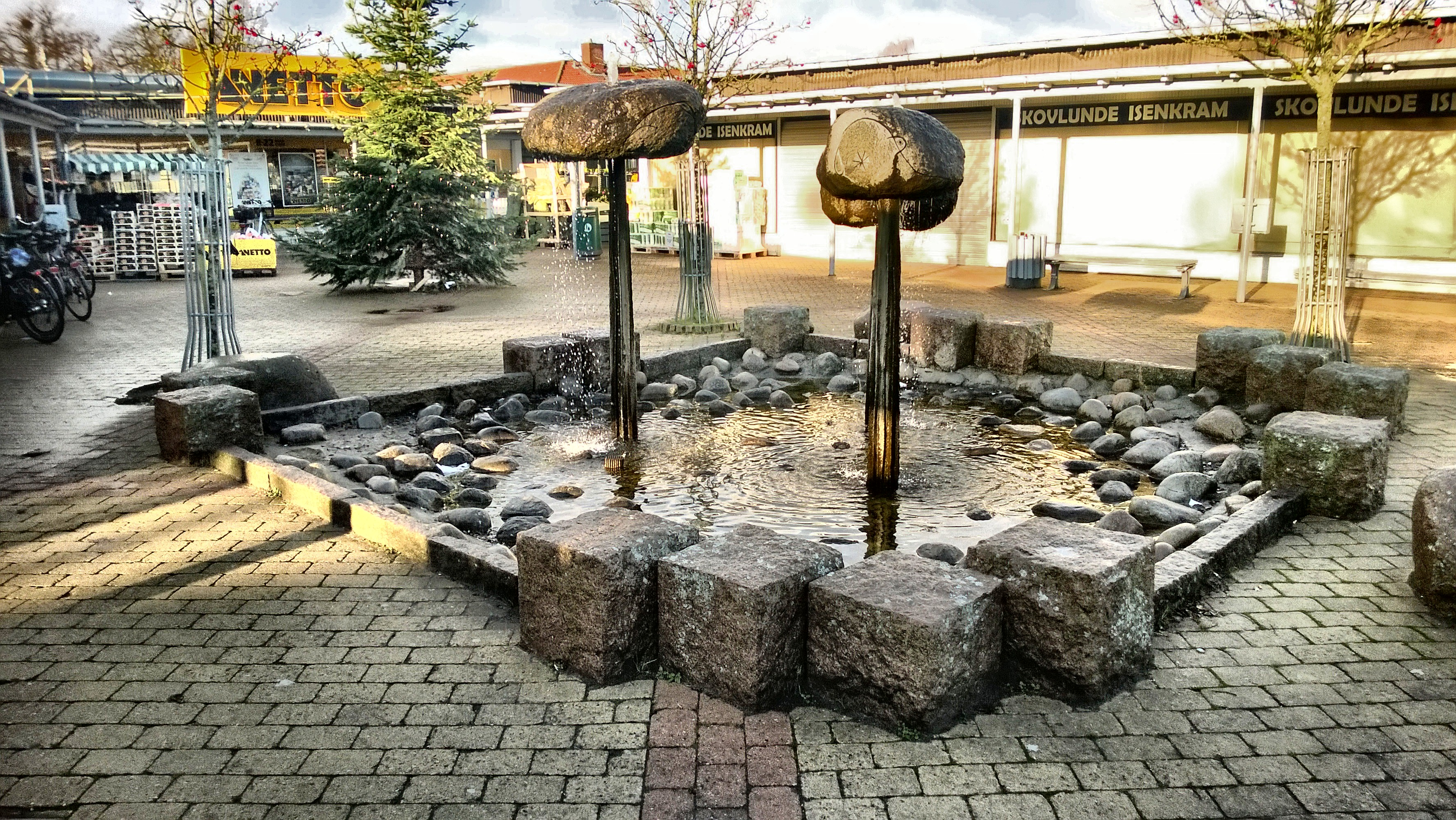
A part of Skovlunde town

Skovlunde is a small Danish town in Ballerup Municipality and is a suburb of Copenhagen (12 km west of downtown Copenhagen). Skovlunde has approximately 12.000 inhabitants and is on the Copenhagen S-train network. Ballerup Municipality has approximately 50.000 inhabitants.

== Overview ==
The town was founded in the Middle Ages and first appears in written material (a letter) dating back to 11 November 1249.

Skovlunde consist of two parts, the older Gammel Skovlunde where you can find housing dating back from the seventeenth century and up to the eighteenth century. The other part of Skovlunde is the product of people relocating from Copenhagen in the 1960s and a lot of newly built residential areas.

== Notable people ==
- Slavko Labović (born 1962) a Serbian-Danish actor, brought up and still lives in Skovlunde
- Jesper Christjansen (born 1987 in Skovlunde) a Danish footballer with nearly 300 club caps, plays for Lyngby BK

== See also ==
- Skovlunde station
