= H (S-train) =

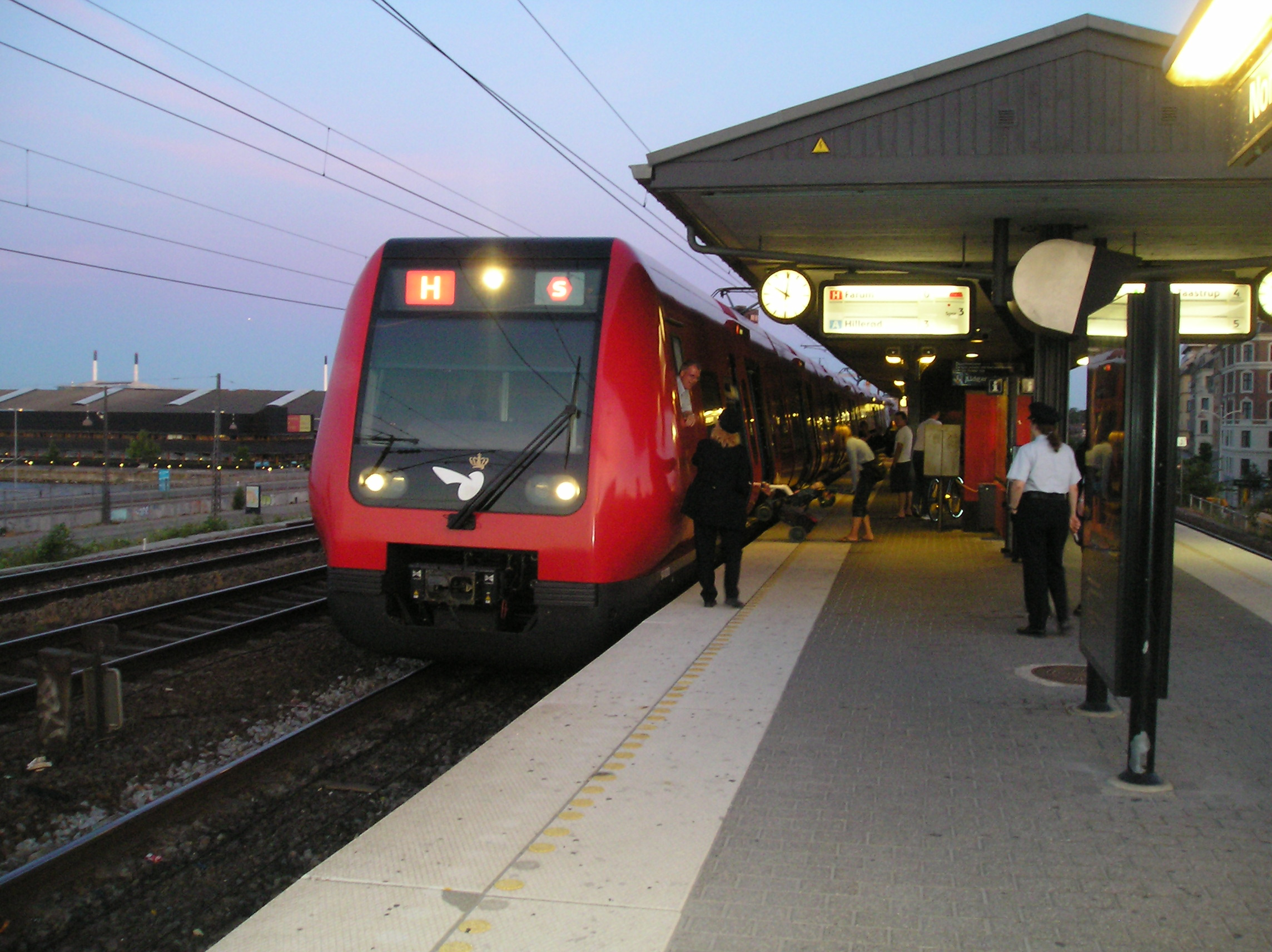
- H train at Nordhavn Station

Overview
- Status: Operational
- Owner: Banedanmark
- Locale: Metropolitan Copenhagen
- Termini: Østerport; Ballerup
- Stations: 30

Service
- Type: Suburban rail, urban rail
- System: S-train
- Operator(s): DSB
- Rolling stock: Litra SA and SE

History
- Opened: 31 May 1987; 38 years ago

Technical
- Line length: 21 km (13 mi)
- Number of tracks: 2
- Character: Commuter rail
- Track gauge: 1,435 mm (4 ft 8 1/2 in) standard gauge
- Electrification: 1500 V DC overhead lines
- Operating speed: 80–120 km/h (50–75 mph)

S-train system map

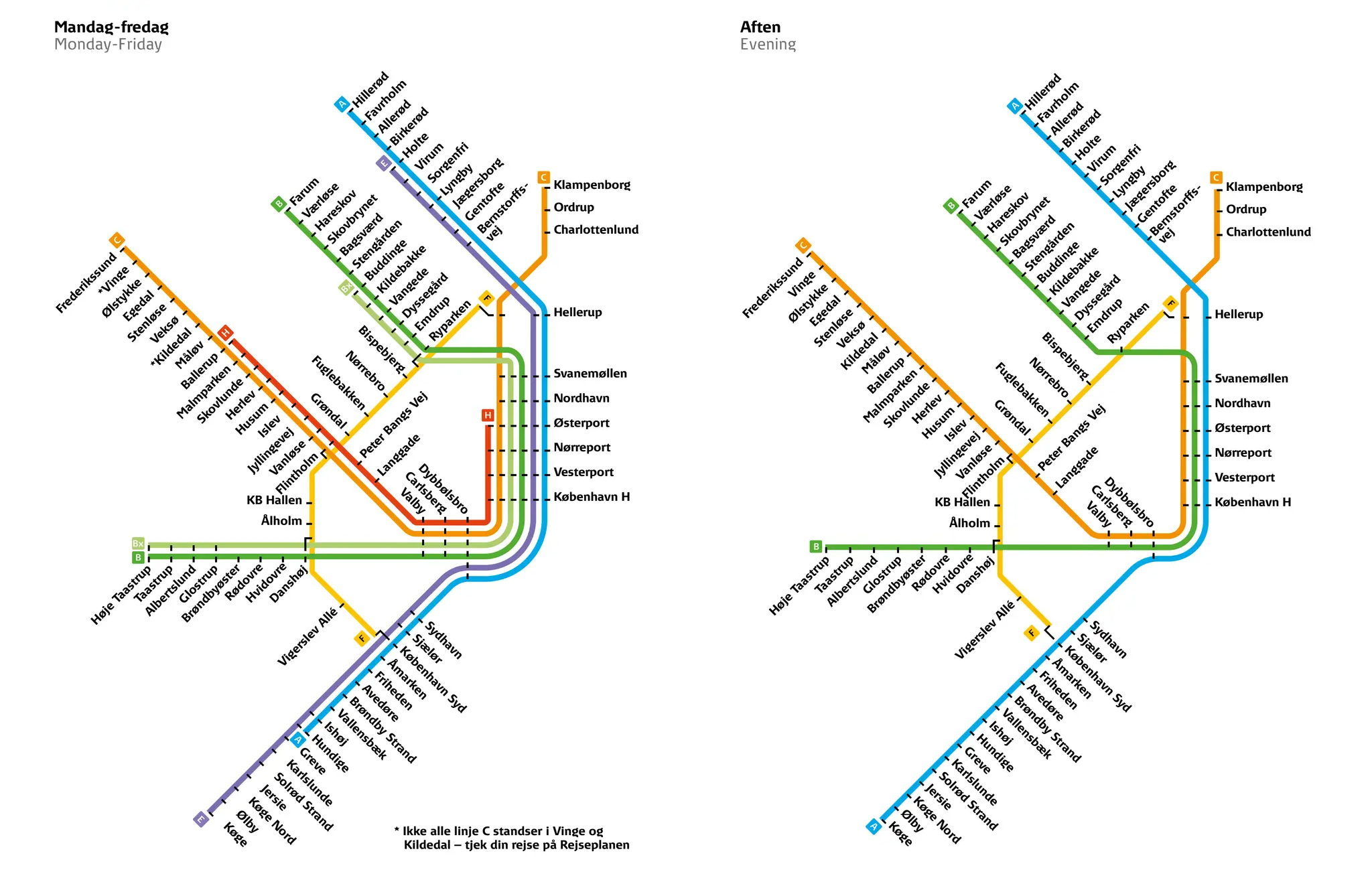
S-train system map

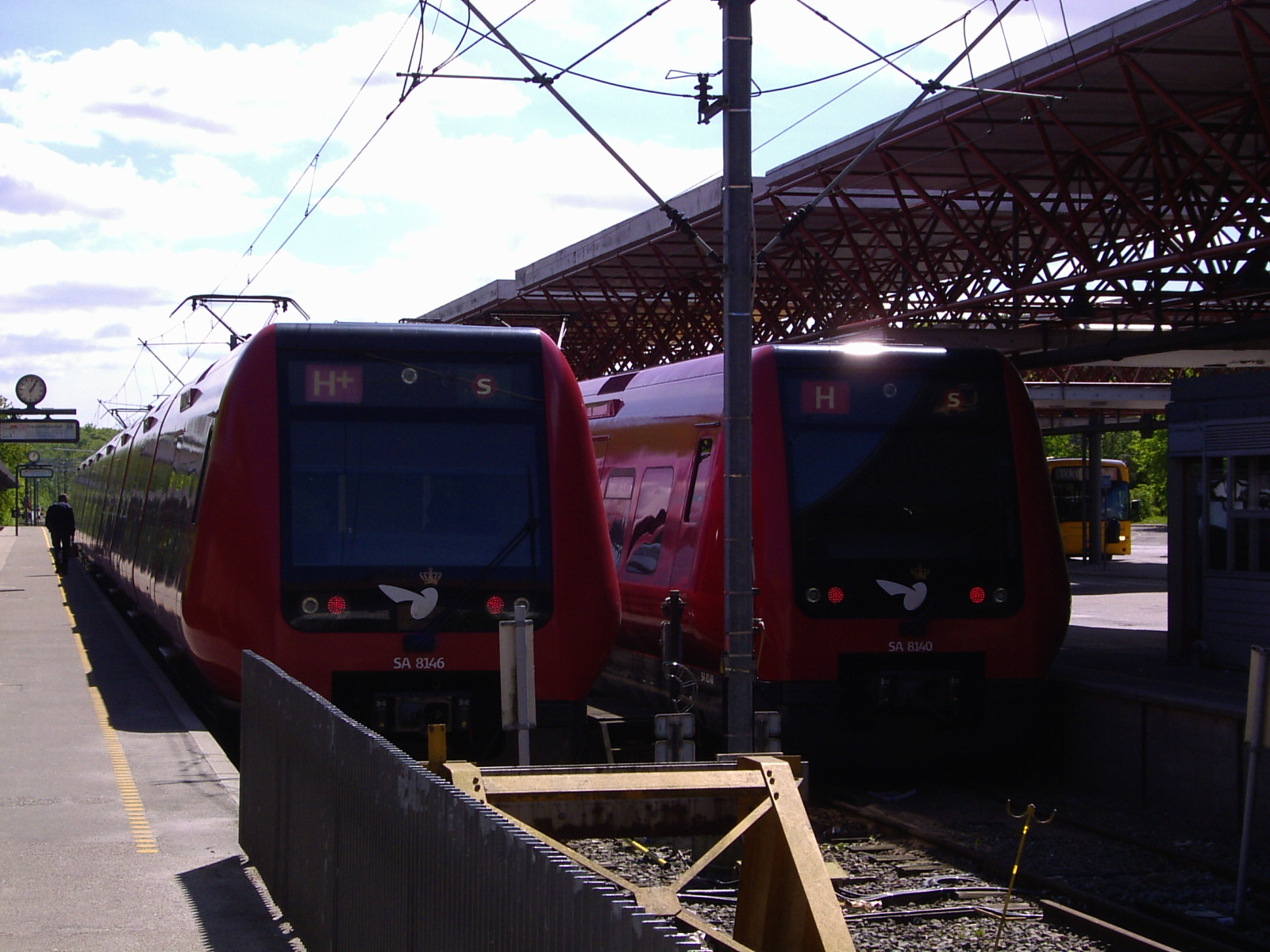
H and H+ service trains at Farum in 2007.

H is an S-train service in Metropolitan Copenhagen, Denmark that serves mainly the outer part of Frederikssundbanen, running partially non-stop between Ballerup and Flintholm. It is one of the six base lines of the S-train network, running every 20 minutes all days from about 5:00 until 1:00. It is the only base line in the network whose frequency is not doubled in the daytime; instead approximate 10-minute service on the outer part of the radial is provided by extending some trains on service C from Ballerup to Frederikssund. On Friday and Saturday nights there is also a 30 minutes service throughout the night.

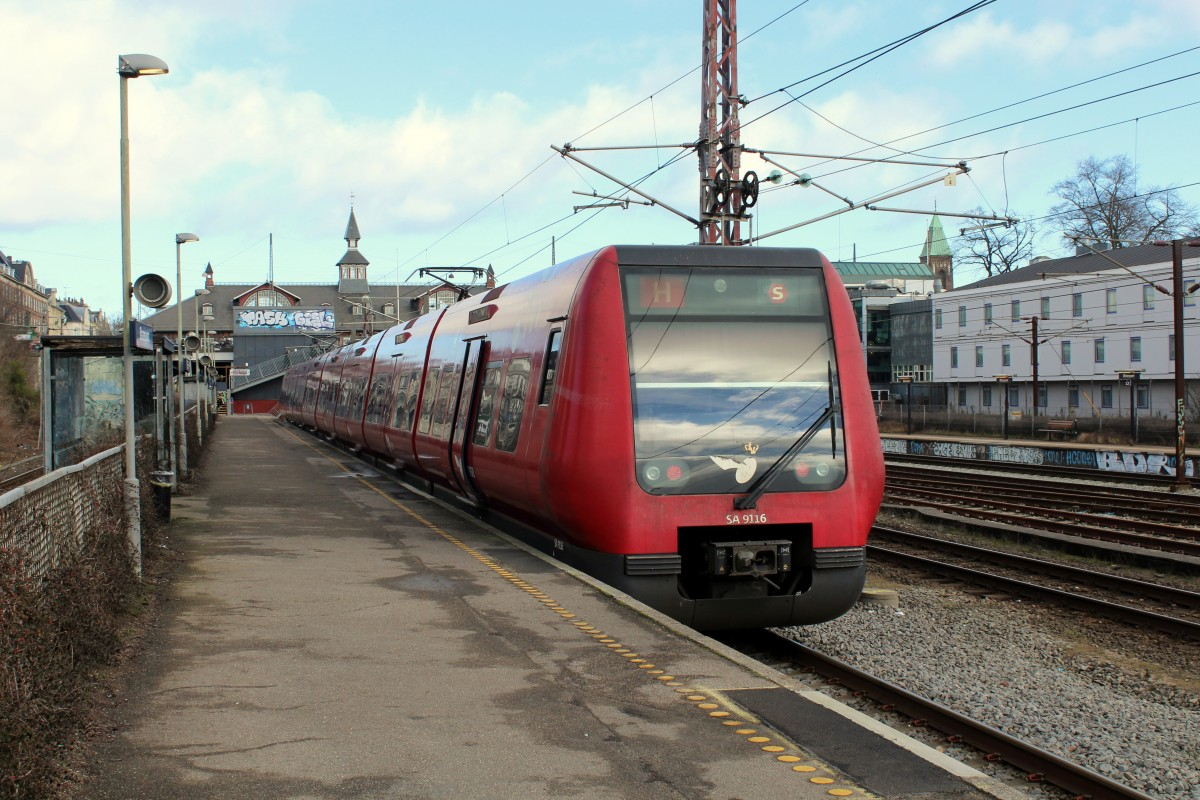
Line H at Østerport Station

== Stations ==
- Frederikssund Originally opened on June 17.th 1879, changed to S-train on May 28.th, 1989
- Ølstykke Originally opened on June 17.th 1879, changed to S-train on May 28.th, 1989
- Gl. Toftegård opened September 15.th, 2002
- Stenløse Originally opened on February 18.th 1882, changed to S-train on May 28.th, 1989
- Veksø Originally opened on June 17.th 1879, changed to S-train on May 28.th, 1989
  - (skipping Kildedal)
- Måløv Originally opened on June 17.th 1879, changed to S-train on May 28.th, 1989
- Ballerup Originally opened on June 17.th 1879, changed to S-train May 15.th, 1949
- Malmparken Opened May 27.th 1989
  - (skipping Skovlunde)
- Herlev Originally opened on June 17.th 1879, changed to S-train May 15.th, 1949
- Husum
  - (skipping Islev, Jyllingevej)
- Vanløse Originally opened on June 17 th. 1879, rebuilt and opened September 23.rd, 1941
- Flintholm opened January 24, 2004
  - (skipping Peter Bangsvej, Langgade)
- Valby Opened November 1, 1934
- Carlsberg Opened July 3, 2016
- Dybbølsbro Opened November 1, 1934
- København H opened May 15, 1934
- Vesterport opened May 15, 1934
- Nørreport opened May 15, 1934
- Østerport opened May 15, 1934

Following stations are not part of this line since 2017, before that serviced only during rush hour. They are serviced by line B.

- Nordhavn
- Svanemøllen
- Ryparken
  - (skipping Emdrup, Dyssegård)
- Vangede
  - (skipping Kildebakke)
- Buddinge
- Stengården
- Bagsværd
  - (skipping Skovbrynet)
- Hareskov
- Værløse
- Farum

== History ==
H as a service letter was first used in 1972 for a service that was designed to be extended to Hareskovbanen, which is probably the reason why this letter was chosen. The service letter disappeared in the 1979 timetable, but was reinvented in 1989.

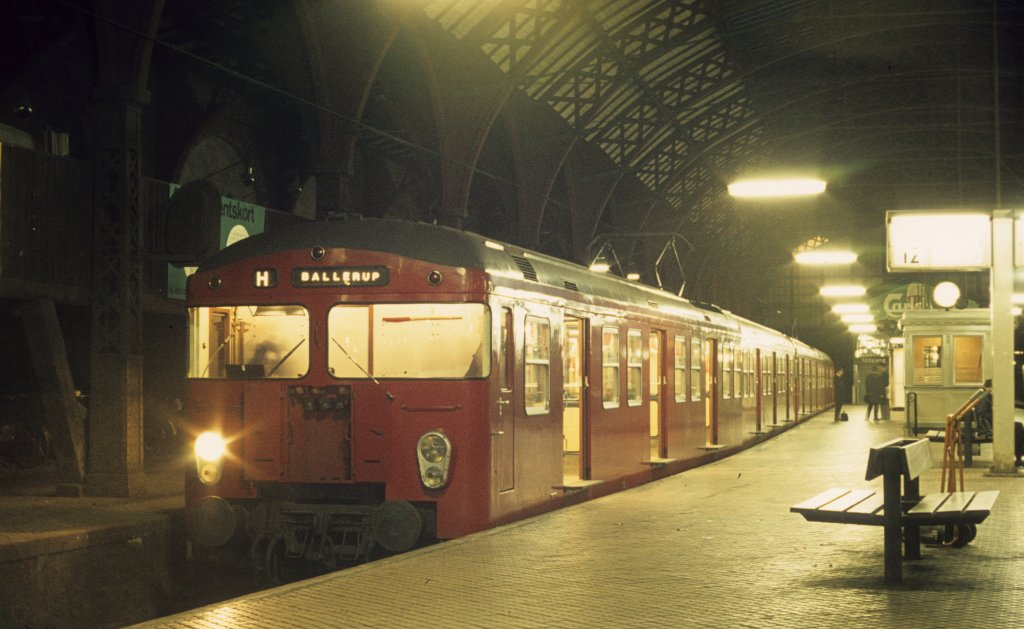
The first line H stands ready for departure at Copenhagen Central Station in 1972, to Ballerup Station.

Name	Southern end	Years	Northern end
H	Frederikssundbanen: all stops to Ballerup	1972–1977	terminated at Østerport
H	Frederikssundbanen: all stops to Ballerup	1977–1979	Hareskovbanen: all stops to Farum
service letter unused 1979–1989
	Frederikssundbanen: to Frederikssund, non-stop København H-Valby-Vanløse-Herlev-Ballerup	1989–2002	Hareskovbanen: all stops to Farum
	as above, plus stop at Husum	2002–2004	Hareskovbanen: all stops to Farum
	as above, plus stop at Flintholm	2004–2007	Hareskovbanen: all stops to Farum
	to Frederikssund, non-stop Vanløse-Herlev-Ballerup and Måløv-Veksø	2007-2009	terminated at Østerport
	to Frederikssund, non-stop Vanløse-Herlev-Ballerup and Måløv-Veksø	Dec 2009–2011	Hareskovbanen: to Farum rush hour Mon-Fri; non-stop Ryparken - Vangede - Buddinge and in Skovbrynet; otherwise terminated at Østerport
	to Frederikssund, non-stop Valby-Flintholm; Vanløse-Husum; Herlev-Malmparken and Måløv-Veksø	2011-2017	Hareskovbanen: to Farum rush hour Mon-Fri; non-stop Ryparken - Vangede - Buddinge and in Skovbrynet; otherwise terminated at Østerport
	to Frederikssund/ Ballerup	2017-	terminates at Østerport

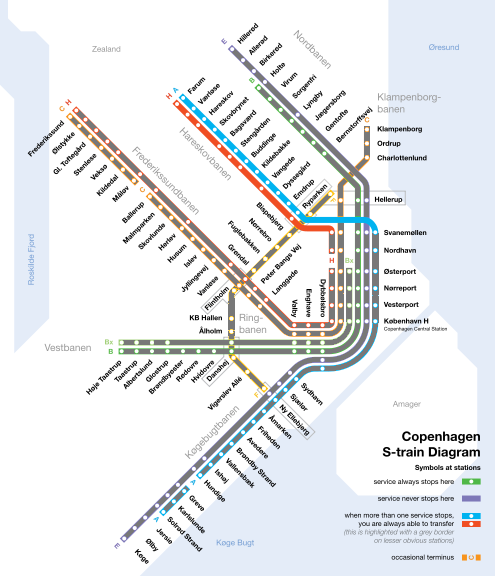
Hareskovbanen, Line H

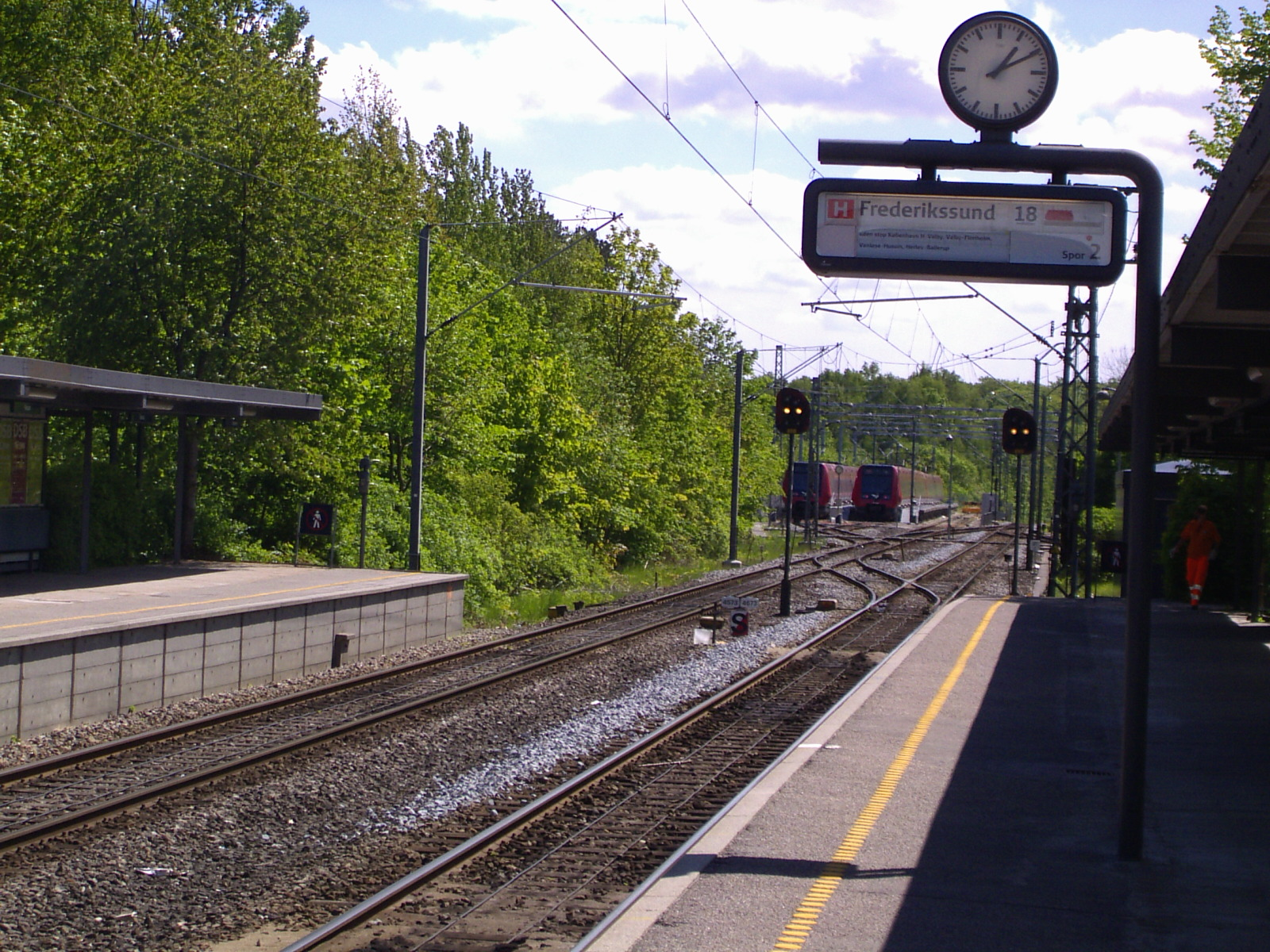

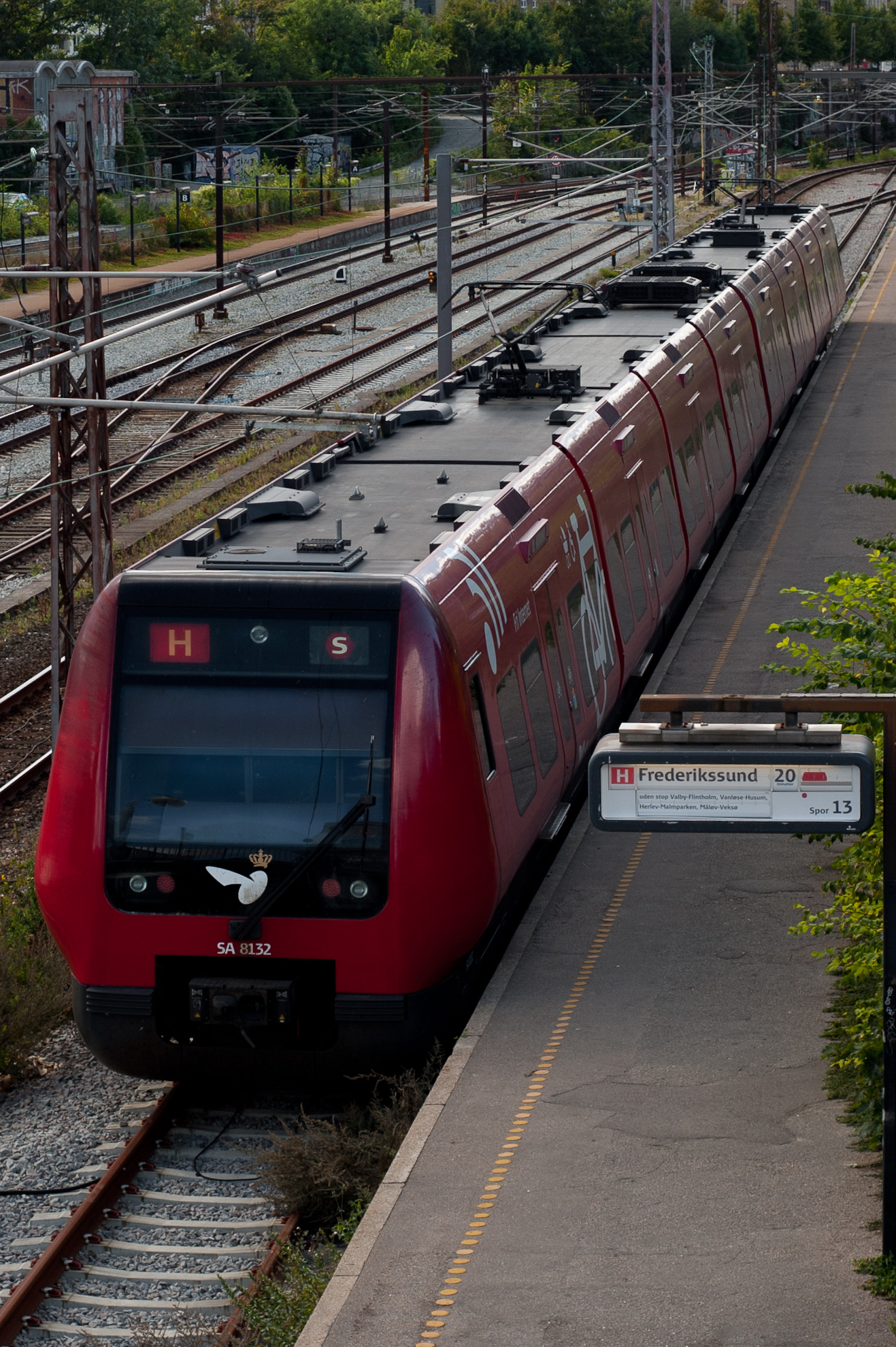

A limited-stop daytime line called H+ ran from 1993 to 2007, initially superseding rush-hour services Cx and Bx on the Ballerup and Farum radials:

Name	Southern end	Years	Northern end
H+	Frederikssundbanen: to Ballerup, non-stop København H - Valby - Vanløse	1993–1995	Hareskovbanen: to Farum, non-stop Østerport - Ryparken; Emdrup - Buddinge - Bagsværd -Værløse
H+	to Ballerup, non-stop København H - Valby	1995–2000	Hareskovbanen: to Farum, non-stop Østerport - Ryparken; Emdrup - Buddinge - Bagsværd -Værløse
H+	to Veksø, non-stop København H - Valby	2000–2001	Hareskovbanen: to Farum, non-stop Østerport - Ryparken; Emdrup - Buddinge - Bagsværd -Værløse
H+	to Veksø, non-stop København H - Valby	2001–2002	as above, plus stop at Vangede
H+	all stops to Frederikssund	2002–2007	as above, plus all stops until Emdrup
Replaced by extended C and A service from September 2007

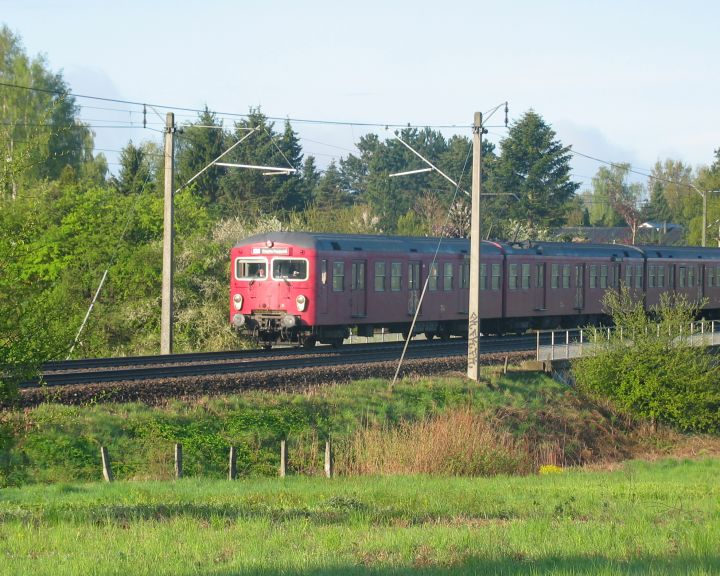
Train of Copenhagen's S-tog (second generation train type) between Farum and Værløse (Lines H & H+). Line H+

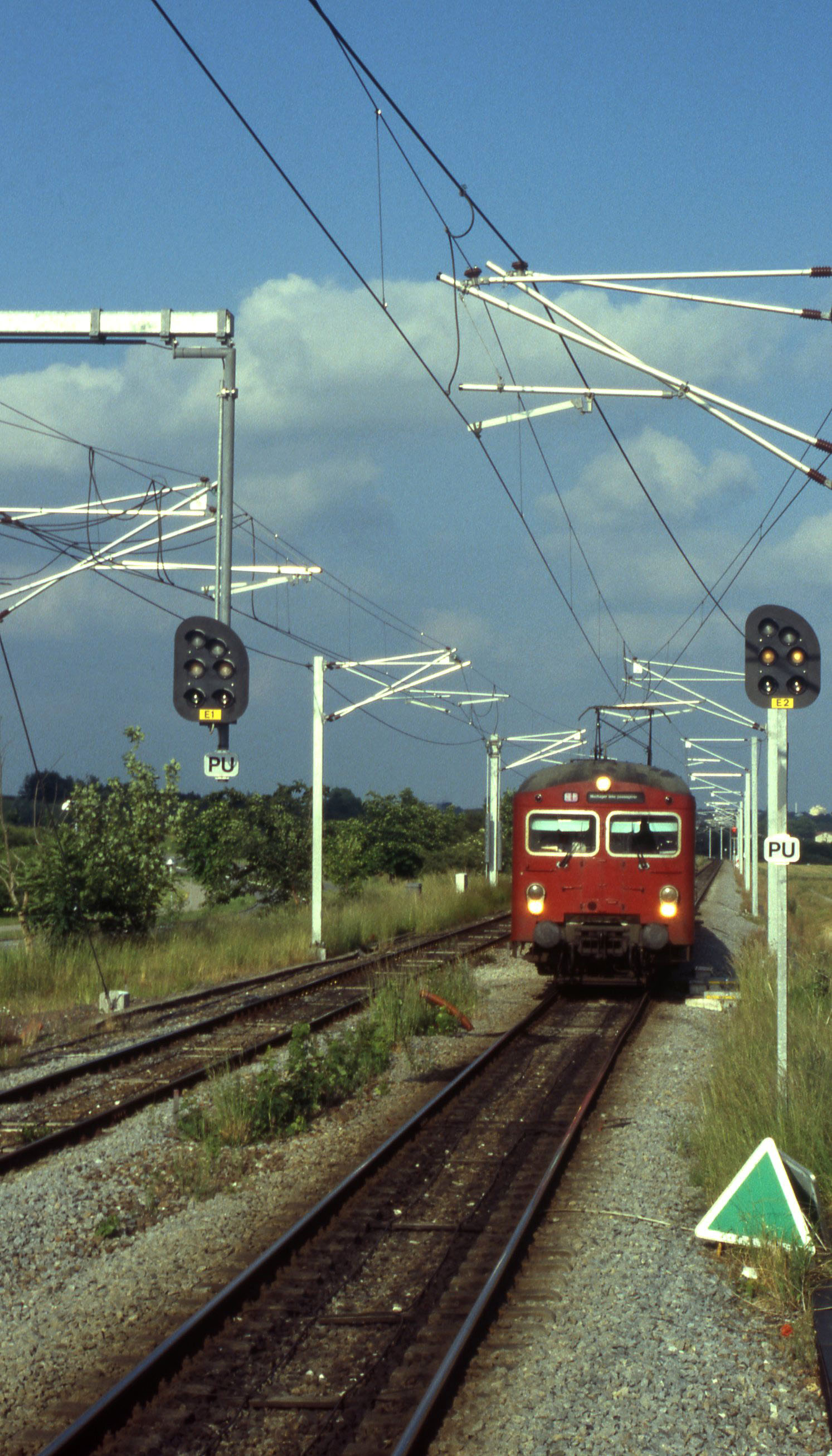
Line H+ in 2002

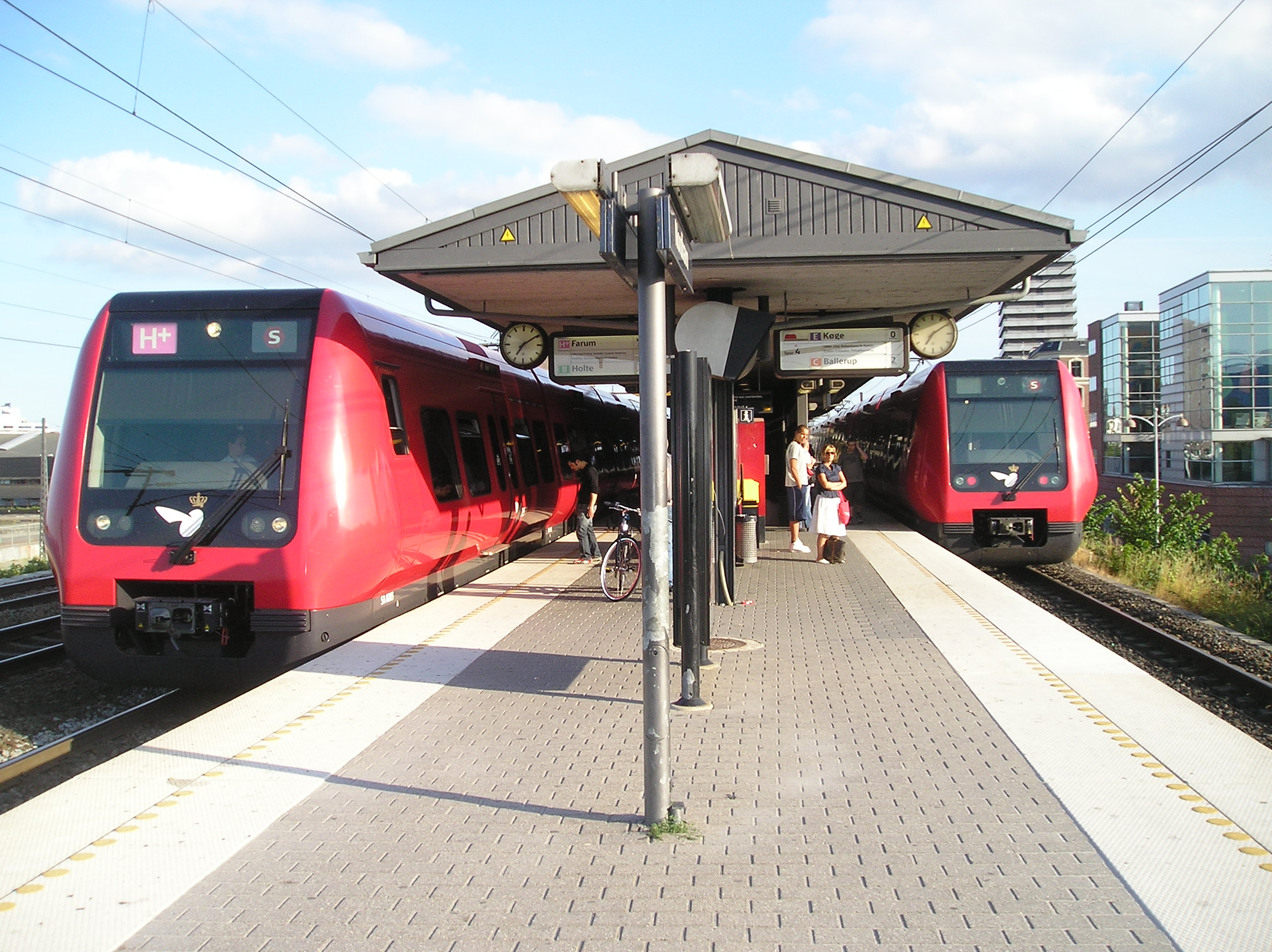
The lines H+ and E at Nordhavn Station in 2006.

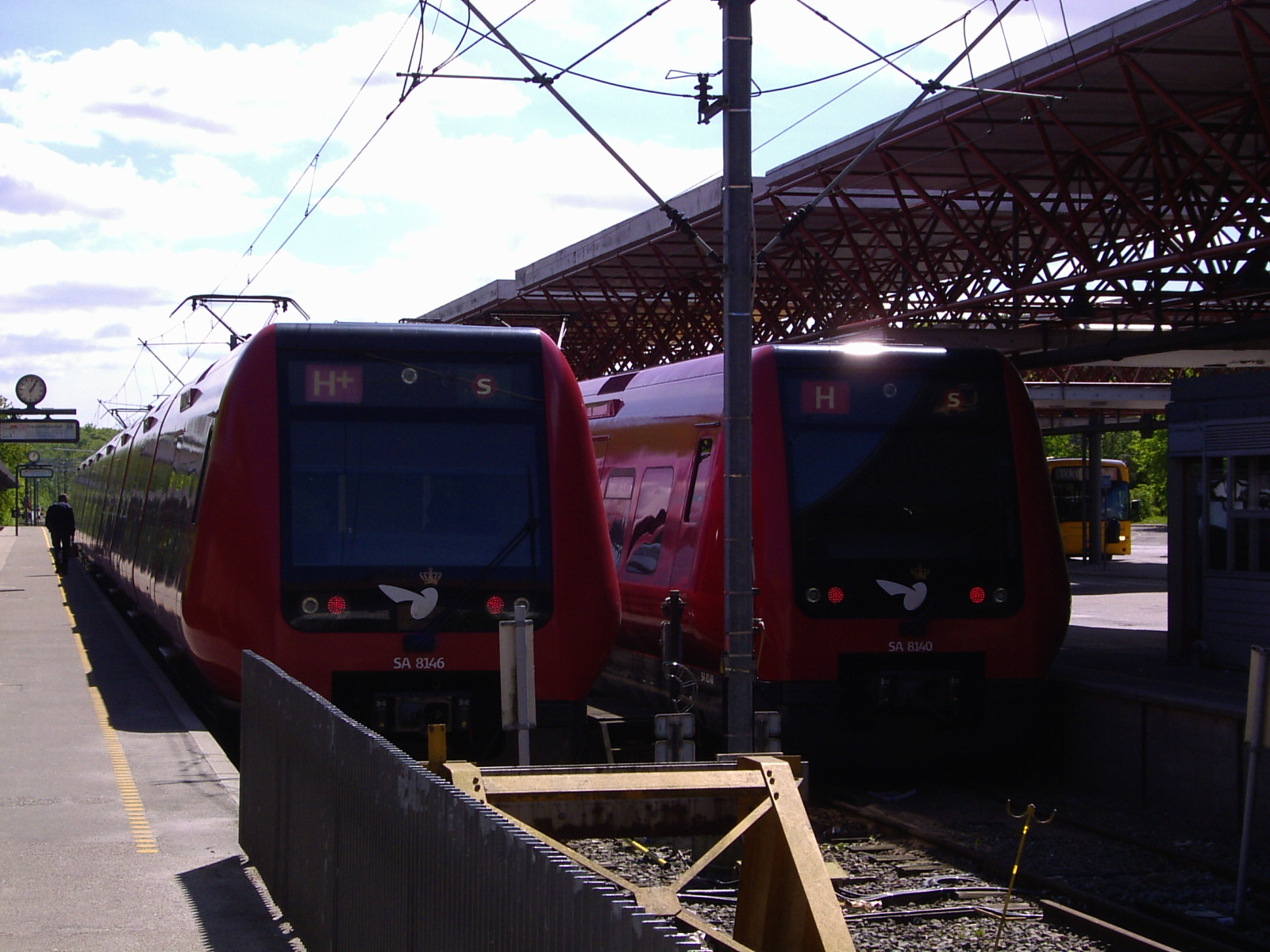
Line H and H+ at Farum station.
