= C (S-train) =

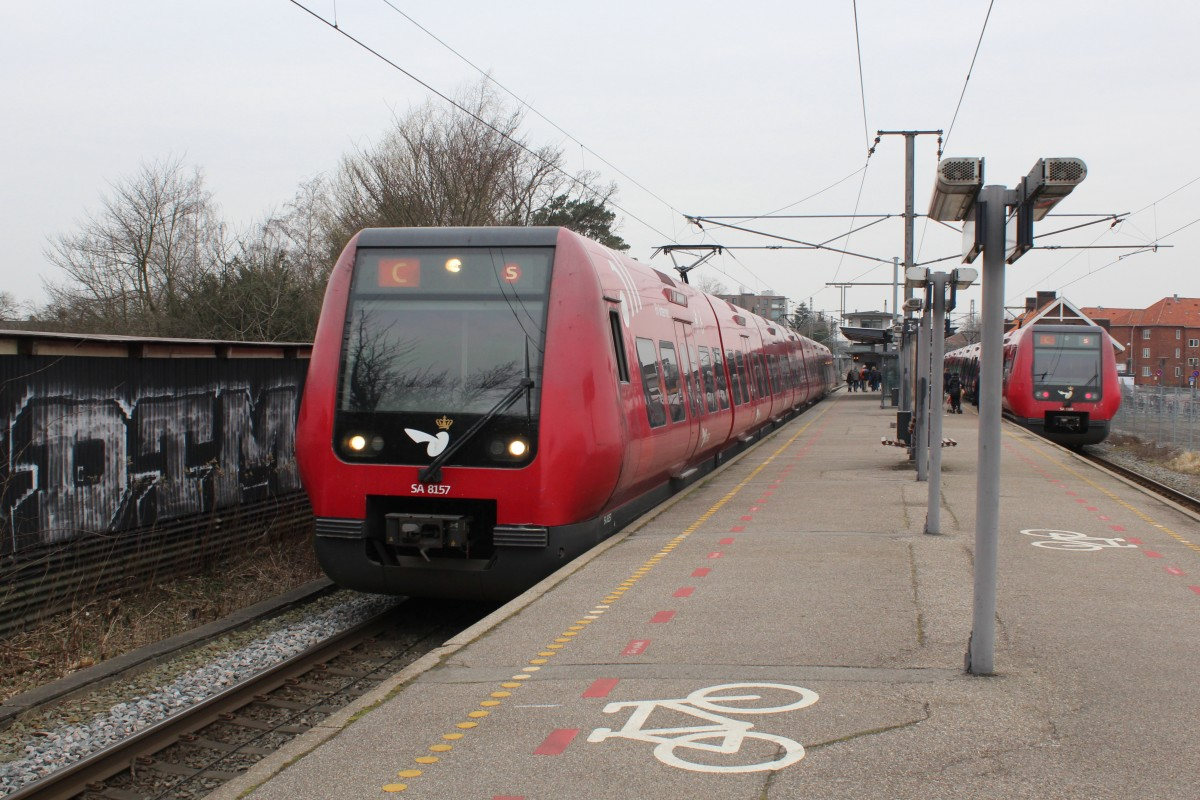
- DSB Copenhagen S-train: Train SA8157 (left) leaving Herlev station for Klampenborg station. (27 March 2015)

Overview
- Status: Operational
- Owner: Banedanmark
- Locale: Copenhagen metropolitan area
- Termini: Klampenborg station; Frederikssund station
- Stations: 32

Service
- Type: Suburban rail, urban rail
- System: S-train
- Operator: DSB
- Rolling stock: Litra SA and SE

History
- Opened: 14 May 1950; 76 years ago

Technical
- Line length: 55 km (34 mi)
- Track gauge: 1,435 mm (4 ft 8 1/2 in) standard gauge
- Operating speed: 120 km/h (75 mph)

C is a service on the S-train network in Copenhagen. It serves the Klampenborg radial and the inner part of the Frederikssund radial, and also reinforces service on the outer part of the Frederikssund radial in high-traffic period.

Service C is one of the base services on the network, running between Ballerup and Klampenborg every 20 minutes from about 5:00 to 1:00 every day. Between about 6:00 to 19:00 on Monday to Saturday it runs every 10 minutes, and in this period half of the trains continue from Ballerup to Frederikssund. On Friday and Saturday nights there is also a 30 minutes service throughout the night.

== History ==
The C service was created in 1950 when the service between Ballerup and Holte (see service B) was split into two in order to make the timetable correspond better in Vanløse. Ever since then C has been primarily a Ballerup service.

Name	Southern end	Years	Northern end
C	Frederikssundbanen: all stops to Ballerup	1950–1955	Nordbanen: all stops to Holte in rush hours
C	Frederikssundbanen: all stops to Ballerup	1955–1963	as above except non-stop Hellerup-Lyngby
C	Frederikssundbanen: all stops to Ballerup	1963–1964	as above, but ran daytime Mo-Sa
C	Frederikssundbanen: all stops to Ballerup	1964–1972	as above, but ran all day Mo-Sa
C	to Ballerup, non-stop Vanløse-Herlev	1972–1973	as above, but ran all day Mo-Sa
C	daytime Mo-Fr as above, otherwise all stops to Vanløse	1973–1979	as above, but only daytime Mo-Fr
Cc	to Ballerup daytime Mo-Fr, non-stop Valby-Vanløse-Herlev	1979–1989	as above, but only daytime Mo-Fr
C	Frederikssundbanen: all stops to Ballerup	1979–1989	Klampenborgbanen: all stops to Klampenborg
C	Frederikssundbanen: all stops to Ballerup	1989–2007	Klampenborgbanen: all stops to Klampenborg
C	all stops to Ballerup; some daytime trains to Frederikssund	Sep 2007-	Klampenborgbanen: all stops to Klampenborg

Note that from 1979 to 1989 both Cc and C services ran.

Until 1979, in the time C ran to Ballerup but not to Holte it ordinarily terminated in Hellerup. These trains were routinely extended to Klampenborg on Sundays where the weather was good enough to attract more passengers than the ordinary service could transport.

Between 1972 and 1979 the stopping Ballerup service was called H.

The rush-hour service Cx ran from 1966 to 1993:

Name	Southern end	Years	Northern end
Cx	Frederikssundbanen: to Ballerup; non-stop København H-Herlev	1966–1972	terminated at Østerport
Cx	to Ballerup; non-stop København H-Jyllingevej	1972–1977	Nordbanen: to Hillerød; non-stop until Holte
Cx	to Ballerup; non-stop København H-Jyllingevej	1977–1989	as above plus stop in Lyngby
Cx	to Ballerup; non-stop Valby-Jyllingevej	1989–1993	terminated at København H
Superseded by service H+
