= Ballerup station =

Commuter railway station in Greater Copenhagen, Denmark

Ballerup
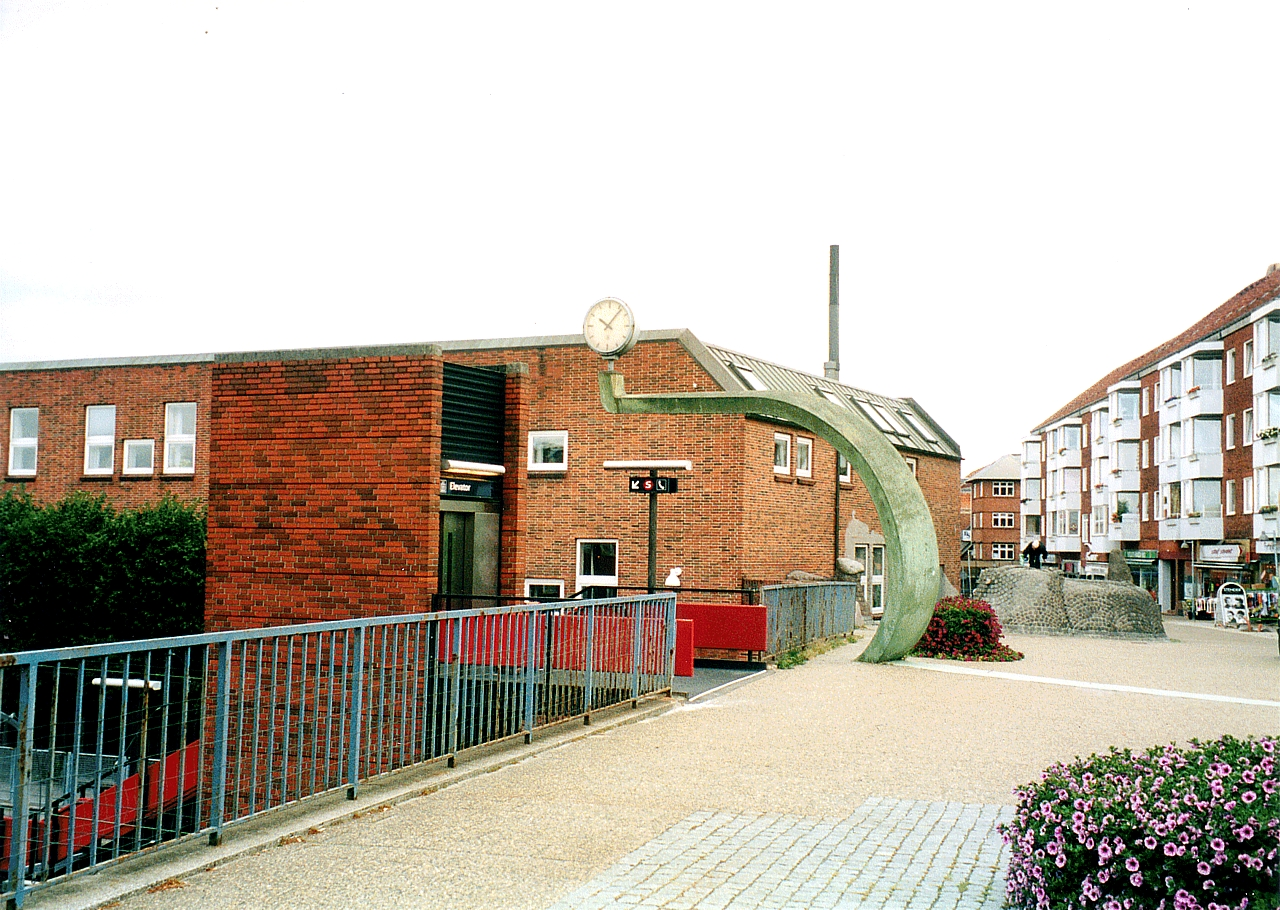
- Ballerup station in 2009

General information
- Location: Banegårdspladsen 3; 2750 Ballerup; Ballerup Municipality; Denmark
- Coordinates: 55.7298°N 12.3582°E
- Elevation: 31.6 metres (104 ft)
- Owner: DSB (station infrastructure); Banedanmark (rail infrastructure)
- Line: Frederikssund Line
- Platforms: 2 side platforms
- Tracks: 2
- Train operators: DSB
- Bus routes: 42, 142, 143, 144, 147, 152, 153, 155, 156, 157, 158, 159, 163, 164, 165, 168, 216, 400, 40E, 55E, 81N, 350S, 400S, 500S, 834, 835, 862, 866

Other information
- Station code: Ba
- Fare zone: 42
- Website: Official website

History
- Opened: 17 June 1879; 147 years ago
- Rebuilt: 15 May 1949 (S-train)
- Electrified: 1949 (S-train)

Services
Preceding station	S-train	Following station
Malmparken towards Klampenborg	C	Måløv towards Frederikssund
Malmparken towards Østerport	H Mon–Fri	Terminus
Location

Ballerup station is a suburban rail railway station serving the suburb of Ballerup northwest of Copenhagen, Denmark. It is situated in the middle of the suburb, and is integrated in the adjacent shopping center Ballerup Centret.

Ballerup station is located on the Frederikssund radial of Copenhagen's S-train network, a hybrid commuter rail and rapid transit system serving Greater Copenhagen. It is an important transport hub for public transport in the northwestern suburbs of Copenhagen, and its large bus terminal is the terminus for many local bus lines through the rural areas outside the urban corridor that continues towards Frederikssund. The station is the terminus for most trains on the H-line S-train service, and contains a group of parking and reversing tracks between the main tracks west of the platform.

== History ==
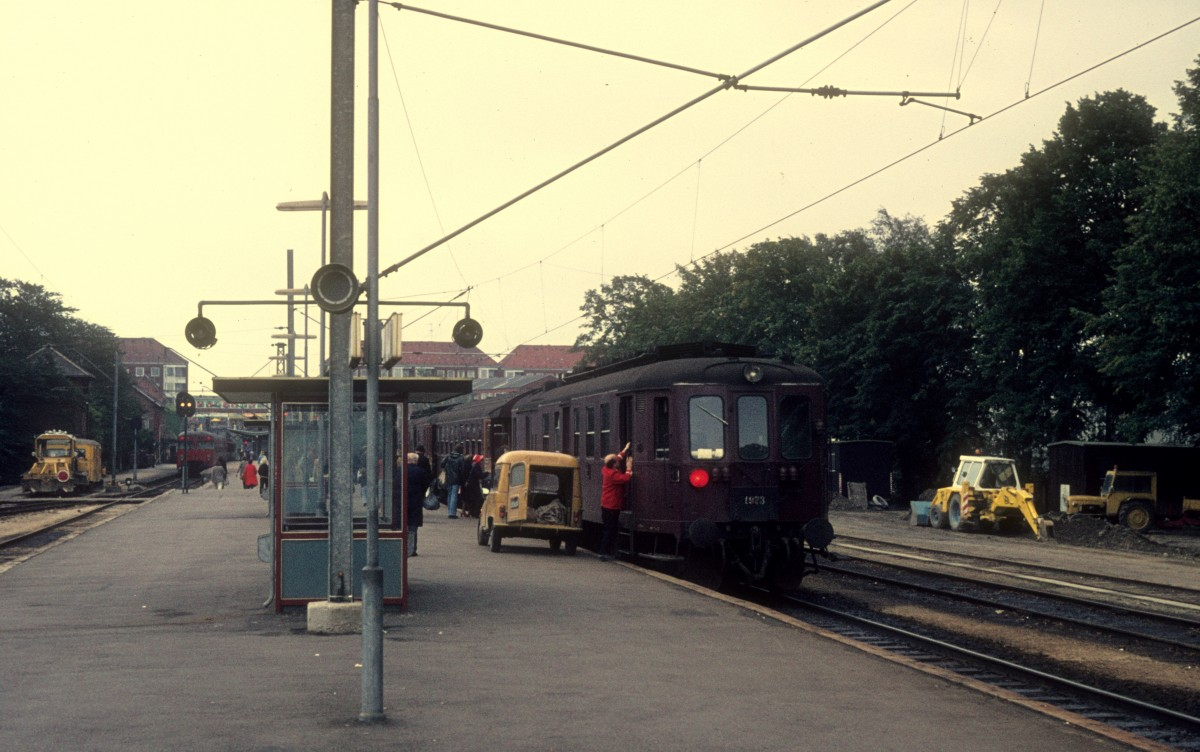
Ballerup station in 1974. To the right a local diesel train to Frederikssund is getting ready to depart, to the left a 2nd generation S-train to Copenhagen.

Ballerup station opened on 17 June 1879 as one of the original intermediate stations on the Frederikssund Line between Copenhagen and Frederikssund.

On 15 May 1949, the S-train network was extended to Ballerup and, for 40 years, Ballerup was a main transfer point between S-trains and the local diesel trains between Ballerup and Frederikssund.

On 28 May 1989, S-train service was extended from Ballerup all the way to Frederikssund.

== Architecture ==
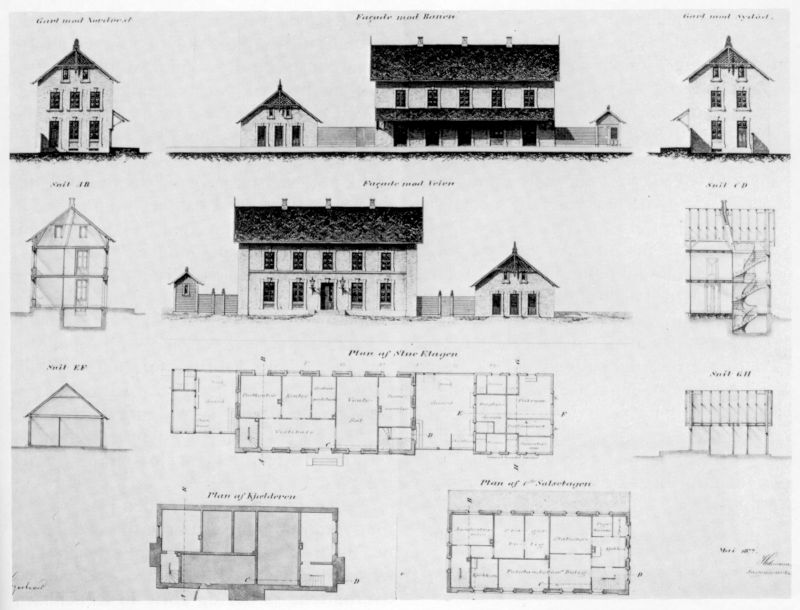
Rendering of Ballerup station. c. 1879.

Like many of the railway stations on the Frederikssund Line, Ballerup station's original station building from 1879 was built to designs by the Danish architect Simon Peter Christian Bendtsen (1842–1912).

The station building was torn down in 1988 and replaced with the current structure which is integrated in the adjacent shopping centre, Ballerup Centret.

== Facilities ==
The station has a combined ticket office and convenience store operated by 7-Eleven, as well as automated ticket machines.

Adjacent to the station is a bus terminal. The station forecourt has a taxi stand, and the station also has a bicycle parking station as well as a car park with approximately 111 parking spaces.

== Operations ==
Ballerup station is served regularly by trains on the C-line of Copenhagen's S-train network which run between Frederikssund and Klampenborg via Ballerup and central Copenhagen. On weekdays the station is also served by trains on the H-line which run between Ballerup and Østerport in central Copenhagen.

== Gallery ==
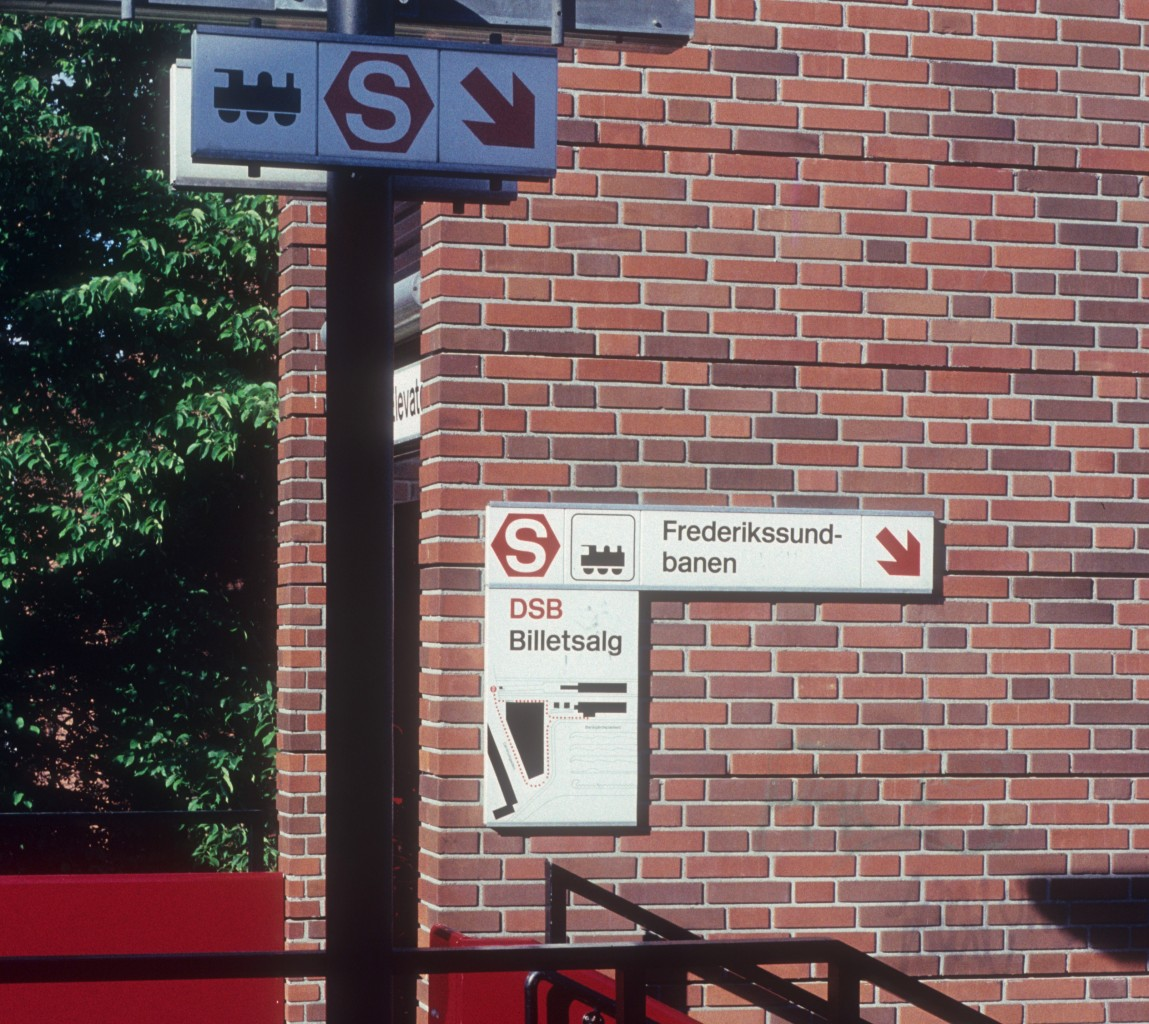
Ballerup Station in 1989

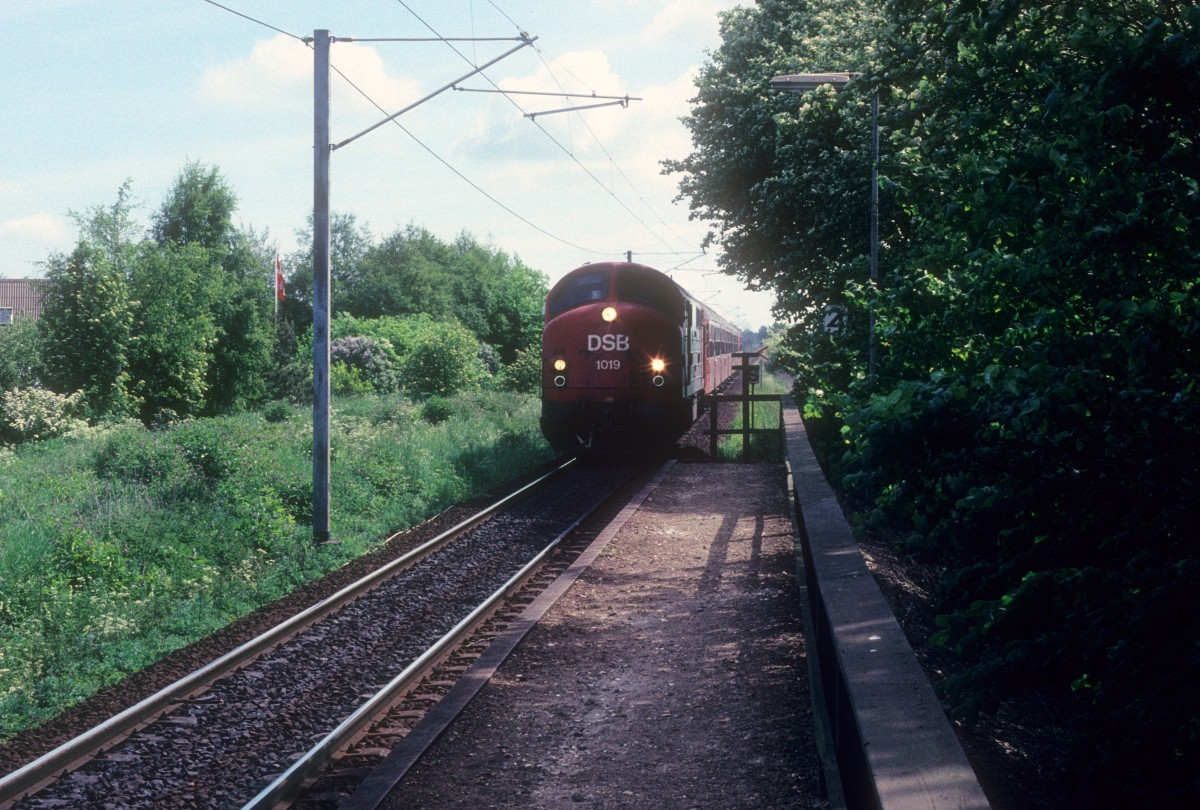

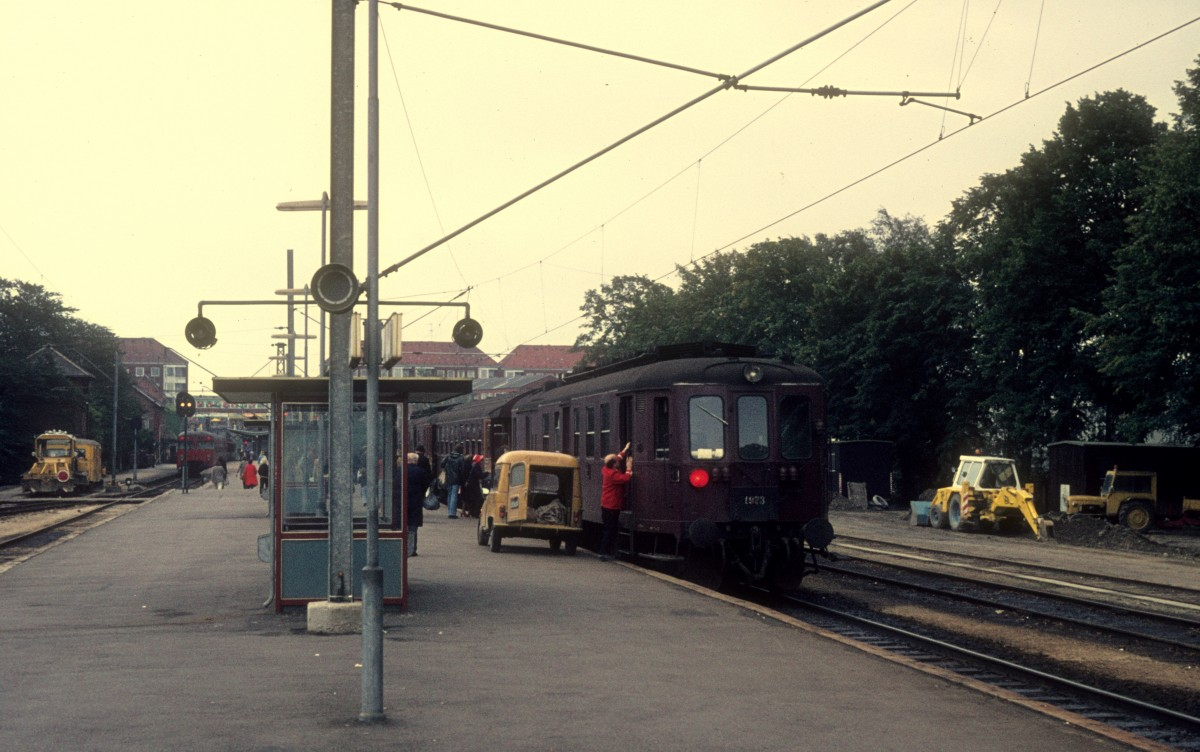

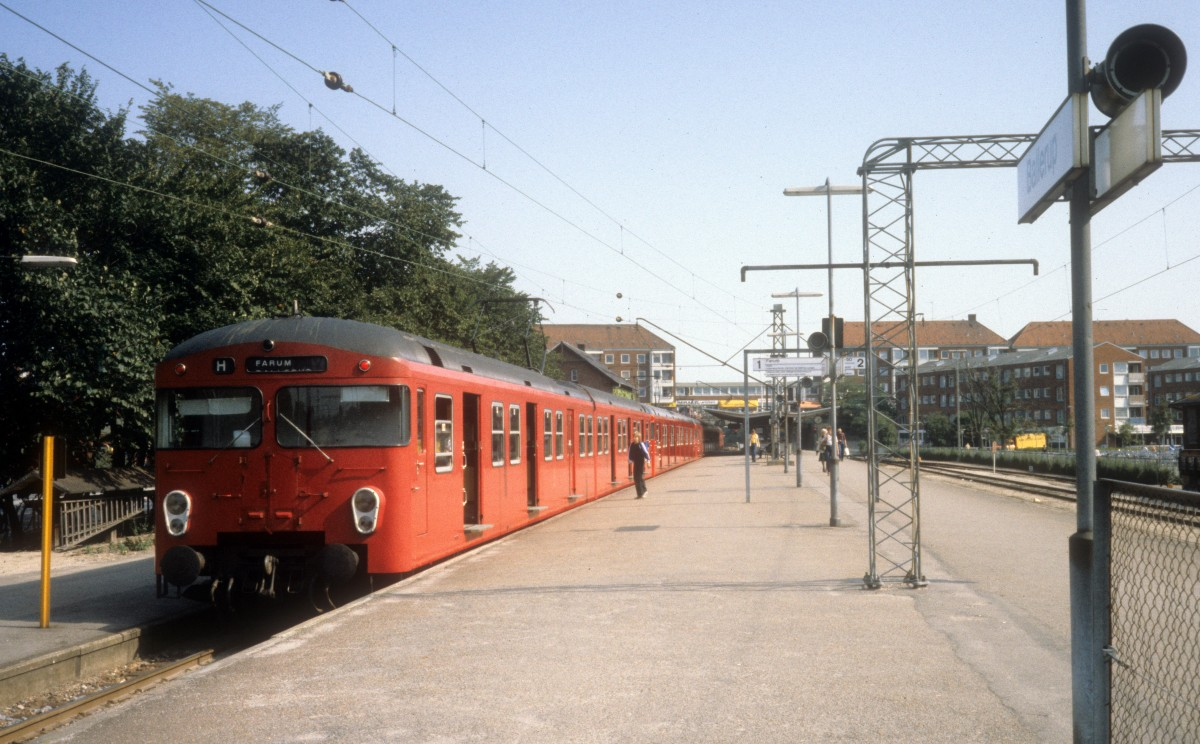
Line H at Ballerup Station

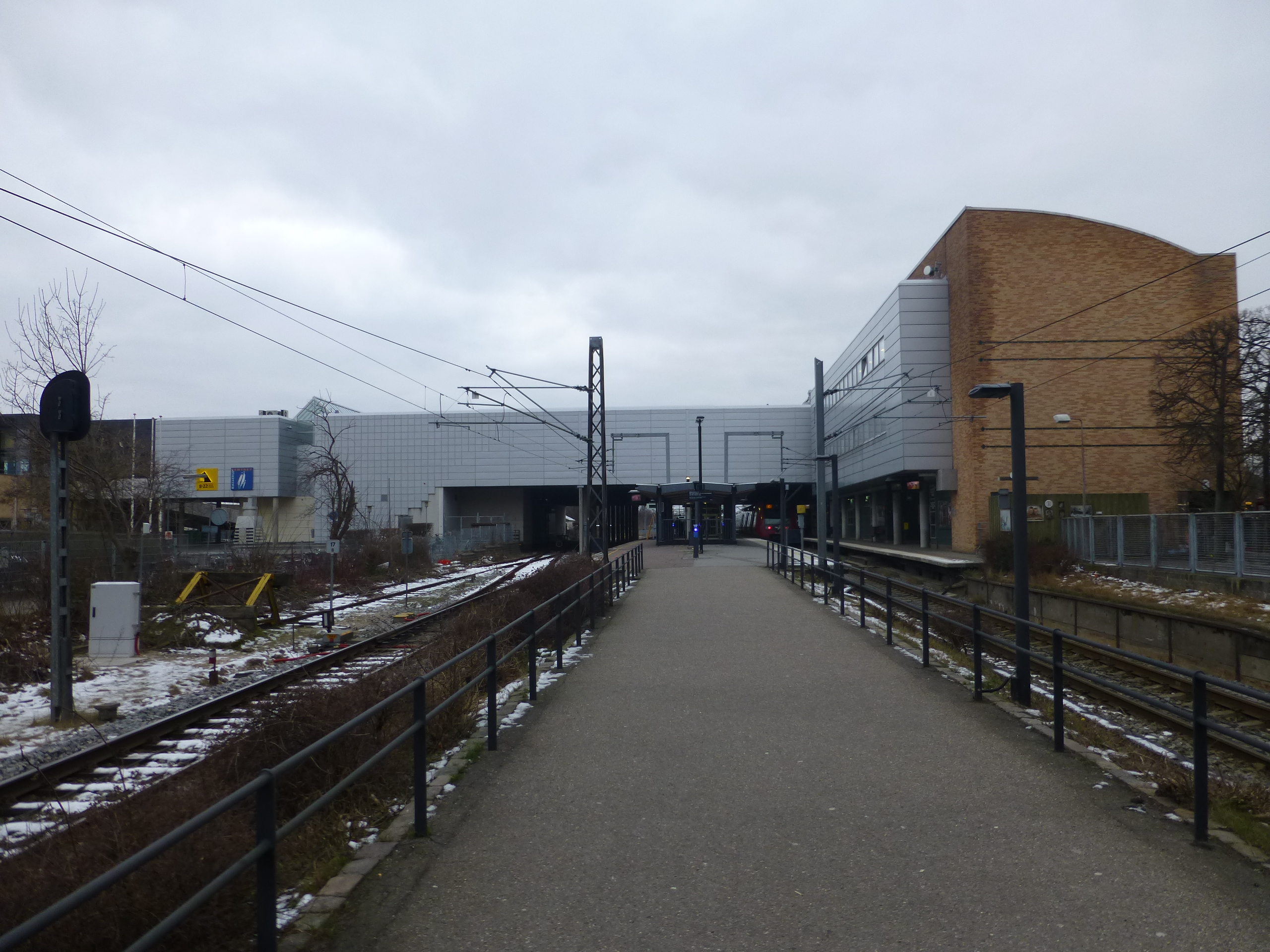

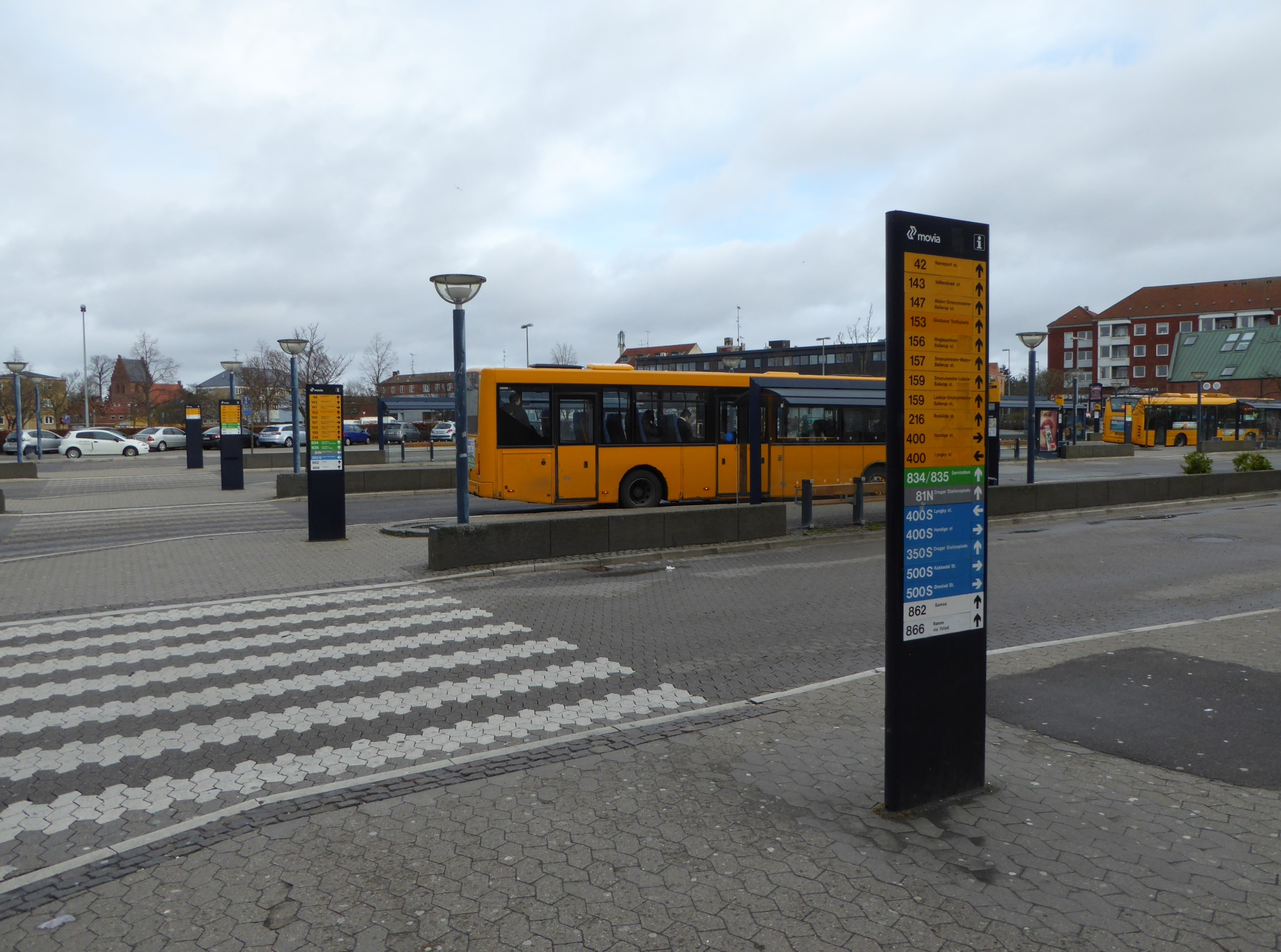

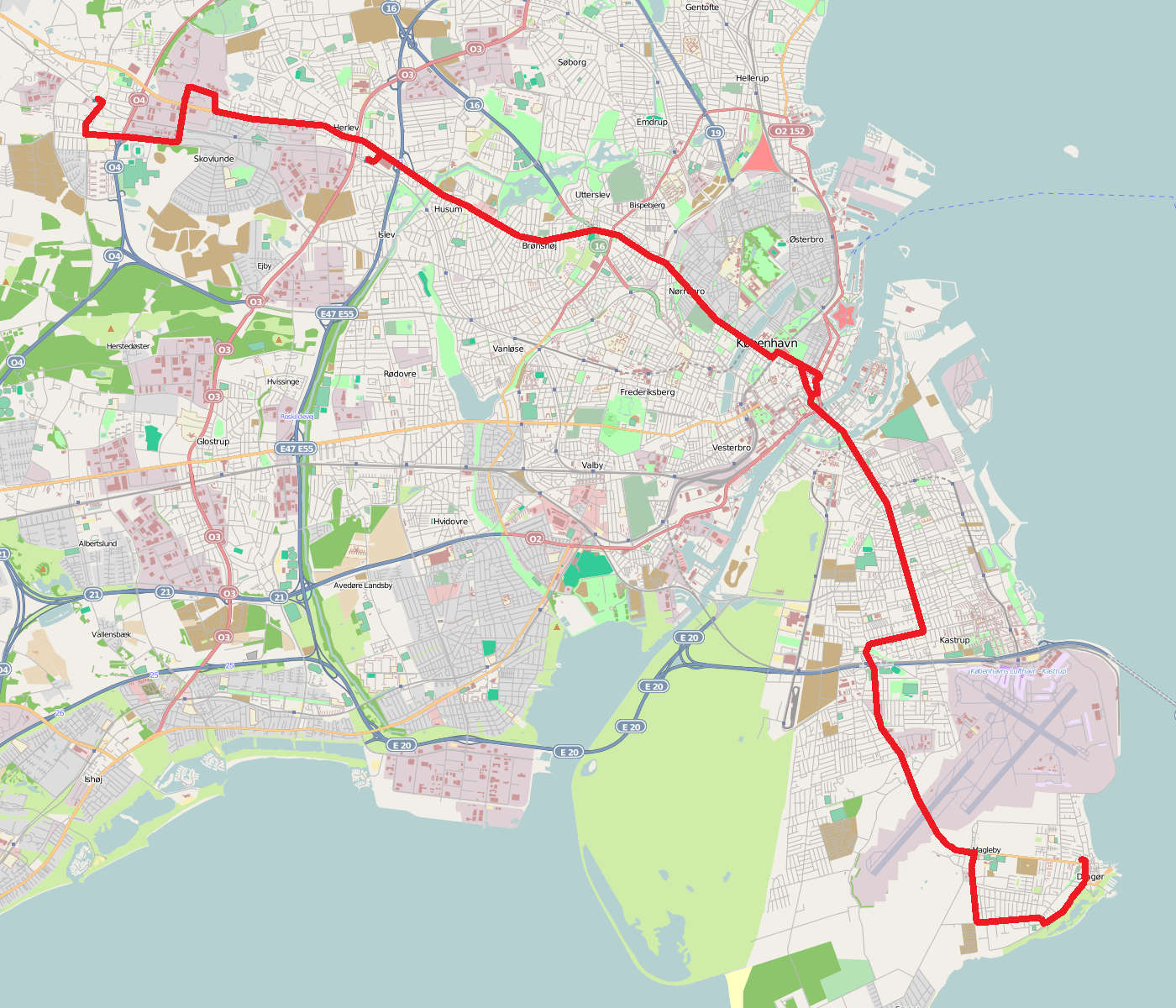

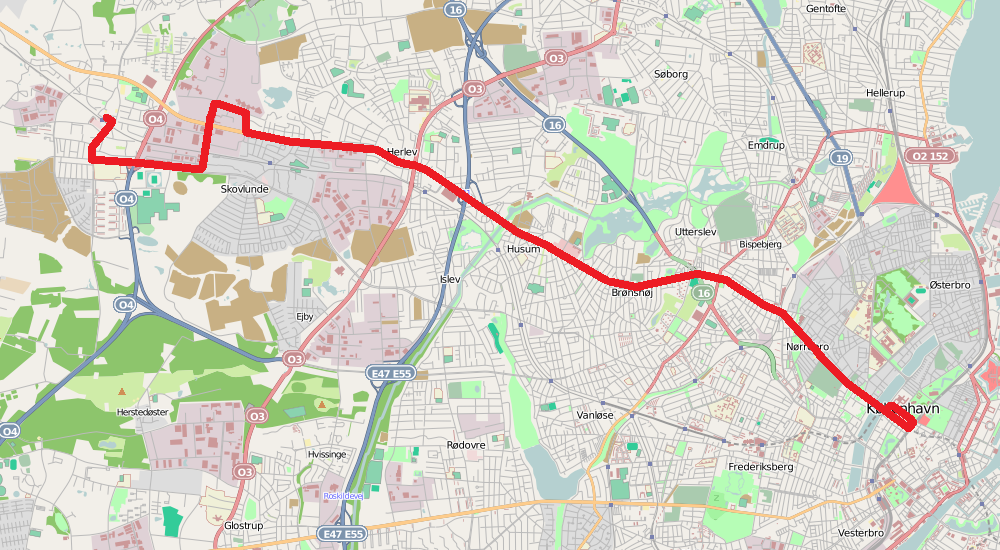

== See also ==
- List of Copenhagen S-train stations
- List of railway stations in Denmark
- Rail transport in Denmark
- Transport in Copenhagen
