= Frederikssund railway station =

Railway station in Frederikssund, Denmark

Frederikssund
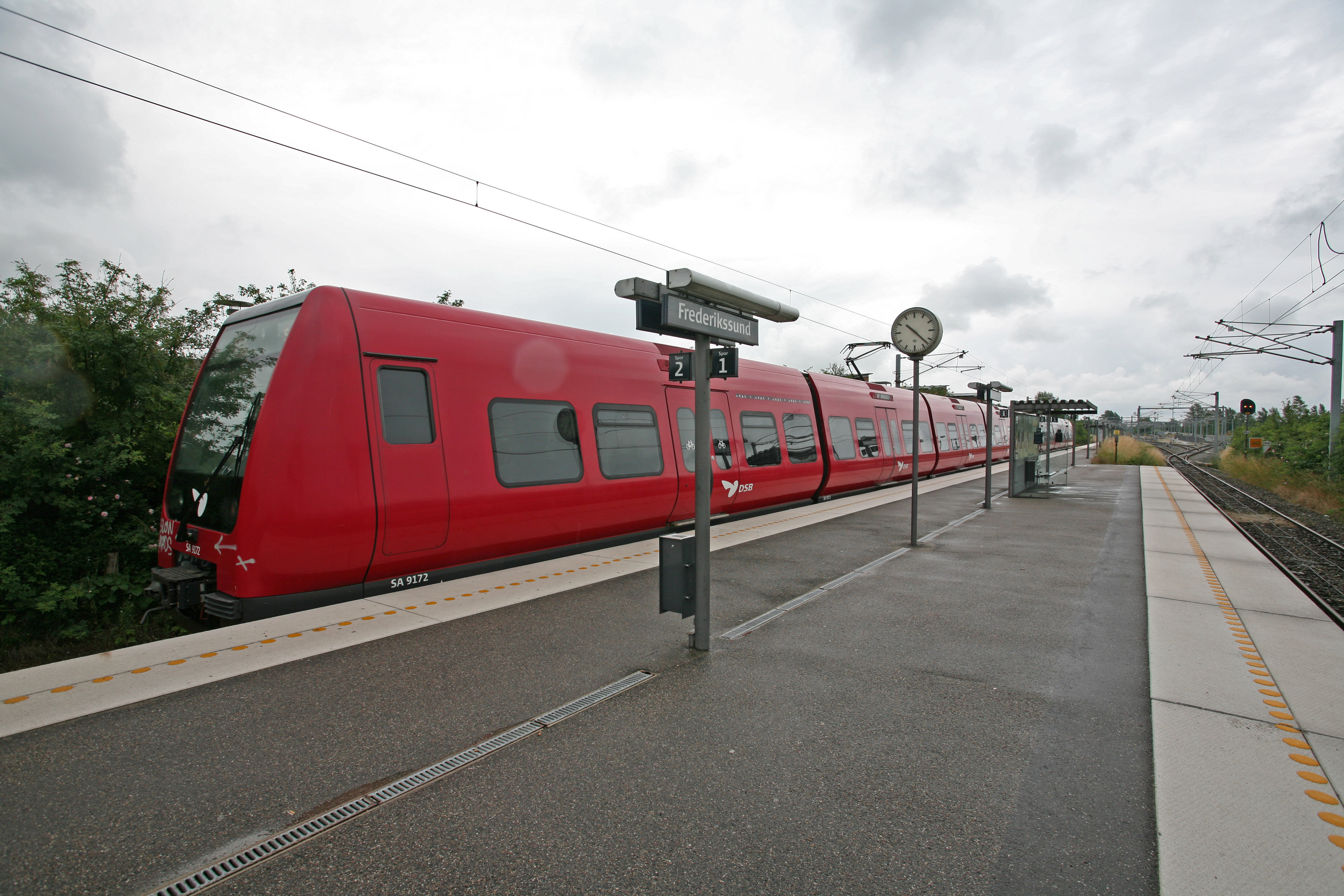
- Frederikssund station in 2007

General information
- Location: Jernbanegade 46; 3600 Frederikssund; Frederikssund Municipality; Denmark
- Coordinates: 55°50′9″N 12°3′56″E
- Elevation: 3.9 metres (13 ft)
- Owner: DSB (station infrastructure); Banedanmark (rail infrastructure)
- Line: Frederikssund Line
- Platforms: 2 side platforms
- Tracks: 2
- Train operators: DSB
- Connections: 311, 312, 315, 316, 318, 325, 230R, 310R, 320R, 65E, 98N

Construction
- Structure type: At grade

Other information
- Station code: Fs
- Fare zone: 7
- Website: Official website

History
- Opened: 15 June 1879; 147 years ago
- Rebuilt: 28 May 1989; 37 years ago

Services
Preceding station	S-train	Following station
Vinge towards Klampenborg	C	Terminus
Ølstykke towards Klampenborg	C Evening trains	Terminus
Vinge towards Østerport	H Special early morning trains Departs from Frederikssund at 04:37, 04:57, 05:17 (Mon–Fri)	Terminus
Location

Frederikssund station is an S-train railway station serving the city of Frederikssund in North Zealand, Denmark. It is located in central Frederikssund on the southern edge of the historic city centre, and immediately adjacent to the Frederikssund bus station.

The station is the terminus of the Frederikssund radial of the S-train network of Greater Copenhagen. The station area includes a large bus terminal from which a network of bus lines service the rural areas in Hornsherred and those north of the urban corridor between Frederikssund and Copenhagen.

== History ==
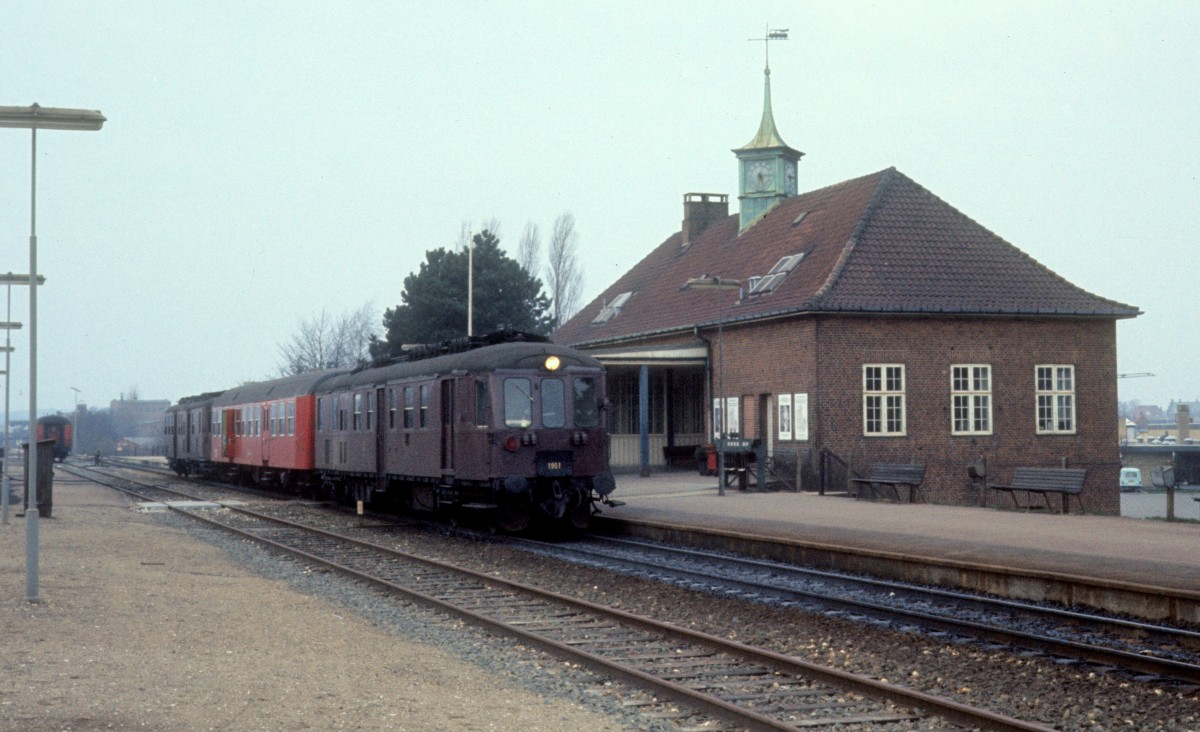
The second station in Frederikssund, photographed in April 1976.

The first railway station in Frederikssund opened on 15 June 1879 as the terminus of the railway line from Copenhagen to Frederikssund. The original station was situated approximately at the location of the current station.

In 1928 the Central Zealand railway opened between Hvalsø and Frederikssund, and the station was moved about 500 m south such that the tracks could continue onto a bridge across the Roskilde Fjord, the remains of which are still conspicuous. It was planned to extend the Central Zealand railway eastwards towards Slangerup and Hillerød, but the project was abandoned and the railway to Hvalsø was closed again in 1936.

The station kept its new, somewhat remote, location for more than 50 years after this, even though the main bus terminal of Frederikssund remained at the original station's location, making transfers cumbersome. The area of the original station remained railway property, being used for freight, but only in 1989, when the railway was converted to S-train service, did the passenger service return to a new station complex at the original location.

Vinge station just south of Frederikssund opened 14 December 2020. It is served by the C line.

== See also ==
- List of Copenhagen S-train stations
- List of railway stations in Denmark
- Rail transport in Denmark
- History of rail transport in Denmark
- Transport in Denmark
