= 2025 Egedal municipal election =

Municipal election in Denmark

← 2021	18 November 2025	2029 →

All 21 seats to the Egedal municipal council 11 seats needed for a majority
- Turnout: 25,863 (73.8%) ▲1.9%
	First party	Second party	Third party
	V	A	L
Party	Venstre	Social Democrats	Lokallisten Ny Egedal
Last election	5 seats, 18.7%	5 seats, 23.0%	4 seats, 17.9%
Seats won	4	3	3
Seat change	▼1	▼2	▼1
Popular vote	4,519	4,463	3,617
Percentage	17.8%	17.5%	14.2%
Swing	▼1.0%	▼5.5%	▼3.7%
	Fourth party	Fifth party	Sixth party
	F	C	E
Party	Green Left	Conservatives	Et Samlet Egedal
Last election	2 seats, 7.8%	3 seats, 12.7%	0 seats, 2.7%
Seats won	2	2	2
Seat change	0	▼1	▲2
Popular vote	2,135	1,993	1,843
Percentage	8.4%	7.8%	7.2%
Swing	▲0.6%	▼4.8%	▲4.6%
	Seventh party	Eighth party	Ninth party
	I	B	O
Party	Liberal Alliance	Social Liberals	Danish People's Party
Last election	0 seats, 1.8%	1 seat, 4.6%	0 seats, 3.3%
Seats won	2	1	1
Seat change	▲2	0	▲1
Popular vote	1,657	1,540	1,368
Percentage	6.5%	6.1%	5.4%
Swing	▲4.7%	▲1.5%	▲2.1%
Mayor before election
Vicky Holst Rasmussen
Social Democrats
Mayor after election
Birgitte Neergaard-Kofod
Conservatives

The 2025 Egedal Municipal election was held on November 18, 2025, to elect the 21 members to sit in the regional council for the Egedal Municipal council, in the period of 2026 to 2029. Birgitte Neergaard-Kofod from the Conservatives, would win the mayoral position.

== Background ==
Following the 2021 election, Vicky Holst Rasmussen from the Social Democrats became mayor for her first term, becoming the first from the party to be mayor in the municipality's history. (Note: counting from 2007 where the municipality was altered) She would run for a second term.

== Electoral system ==
For elections to Danish municipalities, a number varying from 9 to 31 are chosen to be elected to the municipal council. The seats are then allocated using the D'Hondt method and a closed list proportional representation. Egedal Municipality had 21 seats in 2025.

== Electoral alliances ==
=== Electoral Alliance 1 ===
Party		Political alignment
B	Social Liberals	Centre to Centre-left
E	Et Samlet Egedal	Local politics
Å	The Alternative	Centre-left to Left-wing

=== Electoral Alliance 2 ===
Party		Political alignment
C	Conservatives	Centre-right
I	Liberal Alliance	Centre-right to Right-wing
O	Danish People's Party	Right-wing to Far-right
Æ	Denmark Democrats	Right-wing to Far-right

=== Electoral Alliance 3 ===
Party		Political alignment
F	Green Left	Centre-left to Left-wing
Ø	Red-Green Alliance	Left-wing to Far-Left

=== Electoral Alliance 4 ===
Party		Political alignment
L	Lokallisten Ny Egedal	Local politics
M	Moderates	Centre to Centre-right

== Results by polling station ==
Division	A	B	C	E	F	I	L	M	O	V	Æ	Ø	Å
Division	%	%	%	%	%	%	%	%	%	%	%	%	%
Ledøje Forsamlingshus	9.2	5.1	29.9	1.6	5.7	8.9	5.9	1.5	5.1	15.2	2.9	8.5	0.3
Smørum Idrætscenter	18.2	5.2	10.2	2.7	12.2	9.4	8.4	1.8	4.6	20.1	2.1	4.8	0.3
Stenløse	20.3	7.0	5.5	5.4	6.6	5.1	16.1	1.3	4.5	20.6	2.4	4.8	0.2
Veksø	16.0	11.7	4.6	3.4	9.2	4.6	14.0	0.9	5.6	20.8	1.8	6.9	0.5
Ganløse	6.5	6.3	3.6	15.7	4.8	3.6	42.8	0.5	1.9	9.0	0.8	4.3	0.1
Slagslunde	9.3	8.0	5.0	14.8	12.0	4.3	20.1	0.4	4.0	10.4	1.9	9.5	0.2
Ølstykke	18.9	4.5	7.2	11.4	7.3	6.5	11.4	2.0	6.7	16.1	3.2	4.3	0.5
Stengårdsskolen	20.3	5.8	7.6	7.4	7.1	5.5	10.2	1.6	8.5	19.0	2.6	4.0	0.3
Bækkegårdsskolen	21.0	6.1	7.0	7.4	7.1	6.2	11.5	1.6	6.0	18.5	2.6	4.7	0.1

== Results ==
Party		Votes	%	+/-	Seats	+/-
Egedal Municipality
V	Venstre	4,519	17.76	-0.97	4	-1
A	Social Democrats	4,463	17.54	-5.46	3	-2
L	Lokallisten Ny Egedal	3,617	14.21	-3.73	3	-1
F	Green Left	2,135	8.39	+0.56	2	0
C	Conservatives	1,993	7.83	-4.84	2	-1
E	Et Samlet Egedal	1,843	7.24	+4.57	2	+2
I	Liberal Alliance	1,657	6.51	+4.72	2	+2
B	Social Liberals	1,540	6.05	+1.47	1	0
O	Danish People's Party	1,368	5.38	+2.12	1	+1
Ø	Red-Green Alliance	1,260	4.95	+0.56	1	0
Æ	Denmark Democrats	593	2.33	New	0	New
M	Moderates	384	1.51	New	0	New
Å	The Alternative	76	0.30	New	0	New
Total		25,448	100	N/A	21	N/A
Invalid votes		101	0.29	-0.03		
Blank votes		314	0.90	+0.13		
Turnout		25,863	73.76	+1.86		
Source: valg.dk

== Opinion polls ==
Polling firm	Fieldwork date	Sample size	A	V	L	C	F	B	Ø	O	E	I	M	Å	Æ	Others	Lead
Epinion	4 Sep - 13 Oct 2025	428	19.9	14.1	–	9.4	11.6	4.1	8.6	6.6	–	9.2	2.5	0.4	5.1	8.7	5.8
2024 european parliament election	9 Jun 2024		15.5	15.1	–	10.2	17.1	7.6	4.6	7.1	–	8.0	8.0	2.2	4.7	–	1.6
2022 general election	1 Nov 2022		27.3	15.5	–	6.1	8.3	3.4	3.4	3.2	–	8.6	11.8	2.4	5.5	–	11.8
2021 regional election	16 Nov 2021		27.0	17.1	–	18.5	8.0	9.6	4.8	4.9	–	2.1	–	0.3	–	–	8.5
2021 municipal election	16 Nov 2021		23.0 (5)	18.7 (5)	17.9 (4)	12.7 (3)	7.8 (2)	4.6 (1)	4.4 (1)	3.3 (0)	2.7 (0)	1.8 (0)	–	–	–	–	4.3
