= 2021 Egedal municipal election =

← 2017	16 November 2021	2025 →

All 21 seats to the Egedal Municipal Council 11 seats needed for a majority
- Turnout: 24,219 (71.9%) ▼3.9pp
	First party	Second party	Third party
	A	V	L
Party	Social Democrats	Venstre	Lokalisten Ny Egedal
Last election	6 seats, 25.9%	6 seats, 27.5%	Did Not Stand
Seats won	5	5	4
Seat change	▼1	▼1	▲4
Popular vote	5,481	4,464	4,276
Percentage	23.0%	18.7%	17.9%
Swing	▼2.9%	▼8.8%	New
	Fourth party	Fifth party	Sixth party
	C	F	B
Party	Conservatives	Green Left	Social Liberals
Last election	2 seats, 11.6%	1 seat, 6.8%	3 seats, 11.6%
Seats won	3	2	1
Seat change	▲1	▲1	▼2
Popular vote	3,019	1,867	1,092
Percentage	12.7%	7.8%	4.6%
Swing	▲1.1%	▲1.0%	▼7%
	Seventh party	Eighth party	Ninth party
	Ø	O	I
Party	Red–Green Alliance	Danish People's Party	Liberal Alliance
Last election	Did Not Stand	2 seats, 10.4%	1 seat, 4.0%
Seats won	1	0	0
Seat change	▲1	▼2	▼1
Popular vote	1,046	775	427
Percentage	4.4%	3.2%	1.8%
Swing	New	▼7.2%	▼2.2%
Mayor before election
Karsten Søndergaard
Venstre
Mayor after election
Vicky Holst Rasmussen
Social Democrats

In 2017, Karsten Søndergaard from Venstre would secure the party's 3rd consecutive term holding the mayor's position in the municipality.

In this election, a new local party called Lokallisten Ny Egedal would see great success. They would manage to win 4 seats, and become the third largest party. As no bloc had a majority, they could become decisive in deciding who'd become the next mayor. At first, it sounded as Karsten Søndergaard could continue as mayor. However, the Conservatives decided that they could see more influence if they made a constitutional agreement having Vicky Holst Rasmussen from the Social Democrats as the new mayor. Therefore, the Social Democrats would be able to hold the mayor's position in the municipality for the first time. (Note: counting from 2007 where the municipality was altered)

== Electoral system ==
For elections to Danish municipalities, a number varying from 9 to 31 are chosen to be elected to the municipal council. The seats are then allocated using the D'Hondt method and a closed list proportional representation. Egedal Municipality had 21 seats in 2021

Unlike in Danish General Elections, in elections to municipal councils, electoral alliances are allowed.

== Electoral alliances ==
=== Electoral Alliance 1 ===
Party		Political alignment
C	Conservatives	Centre-right
I	Liberal Alliance	Centre-right to Right-wing
O	Danish People's Party	Right-wing to Far-right
V	Venstre	Centre-right

=== Electoral Alliance 2 ===
Party		Political alignment
F	Green Left	Centre-left to Left-wing
H	Et Samlet Egedal	Local politics
Ø	Red–Green Alliance	Left-wing to Far-Left

=== Electoral Alliance 3 ===
Party		Political alignment
A	Social Democrats	Centre-left
B	Social Liberals	Centre to Centre-left

== Results by polling station ==
H = Et Samlet Egedal
L = Lokalisten Ny Egedal

Division	A	B	C	D	F	H	I	L	O	V	Ø
Division	%	%	%	%	%	%	%	%	%	%	%
Ledøje Forsamlingshus	28.5	2.3	26.7	3.7	7.7	0.2	2.2	7.2	2.8	14.9	3.9
Smørum Idrætscenter	20.7	3.7	15.8	2.7	11.9	1.3	1.1	19.2	2.5	16.6	4.5
Stenløse	26.2	6.2	11.4	2.9	5.0	1.7	1.2	16.4	3.3	21.7	4.1
Veksø	22.5	6.9	9.3	2.7	10.1	0.6	1.3	9.1	1.8	28.6	7.0
Stengårdsskolen	25.7	3.8	12.6	3.6	6.6	2.5	2.0	11.0	5.4	23.7	3.0
Ølstykke	22.3	3.3	13.5	4.0	7.0	8.5	4.0	12.9	4.1	16.7	3.7
Slagslunde	18.5	6.7	9.5	3.3	7.7	1.1	1.0	23.5	2.8	14.2	11.8
Ganløse	17.7	5.6	4.7	1.3	5.0	0.5	0.9	49.5	1.0	9.8	4.1
Bækkegårdsskolen	26.5	5.2	12.0	4.0	6.6	2.9	1.9	10.9	3.9	22.3	3.8

== Results ==
Party		Votes	%	+/-	Seats	+/-
Egedal Municipality
A	Social Democrats	5,481	23.00	-2.90	5	-1
V	Venstre	4,464	18.73	-8.74	5	-1
L	Lokallisten Ny Egedal	4,276	17.94	New	4	New
C	Conservatives	3,019	12.67	+1.10	3	+1
F	Green Left	1,867	7.83	New	2	New
B	Social Liberals	1,092	4.58	-7.06	1	-2
Ø	Red-Green Alliance	1,046	4.39	New	1	New
O	Danish People's Party	775	3.25	-7.15	0	-2
D	New Right	747	3.13	New	0	New
H	Et Samlet Egedal	637	2.67	New	0	New
I	Liberal Alliance	427	1.79	-2.21	0	-1
Total		23,831	100	N/A	21	N/A
Invalid votes		106	0.31	-0.04		
Blank votes		282	0.84	-0.17		
Turnout		24,219	71.90	-3.85		
Source: valg.dk
