= Melchior's Dower House =

Building in Egedal Municipality, Denmark

- Melchiors Enkesæde
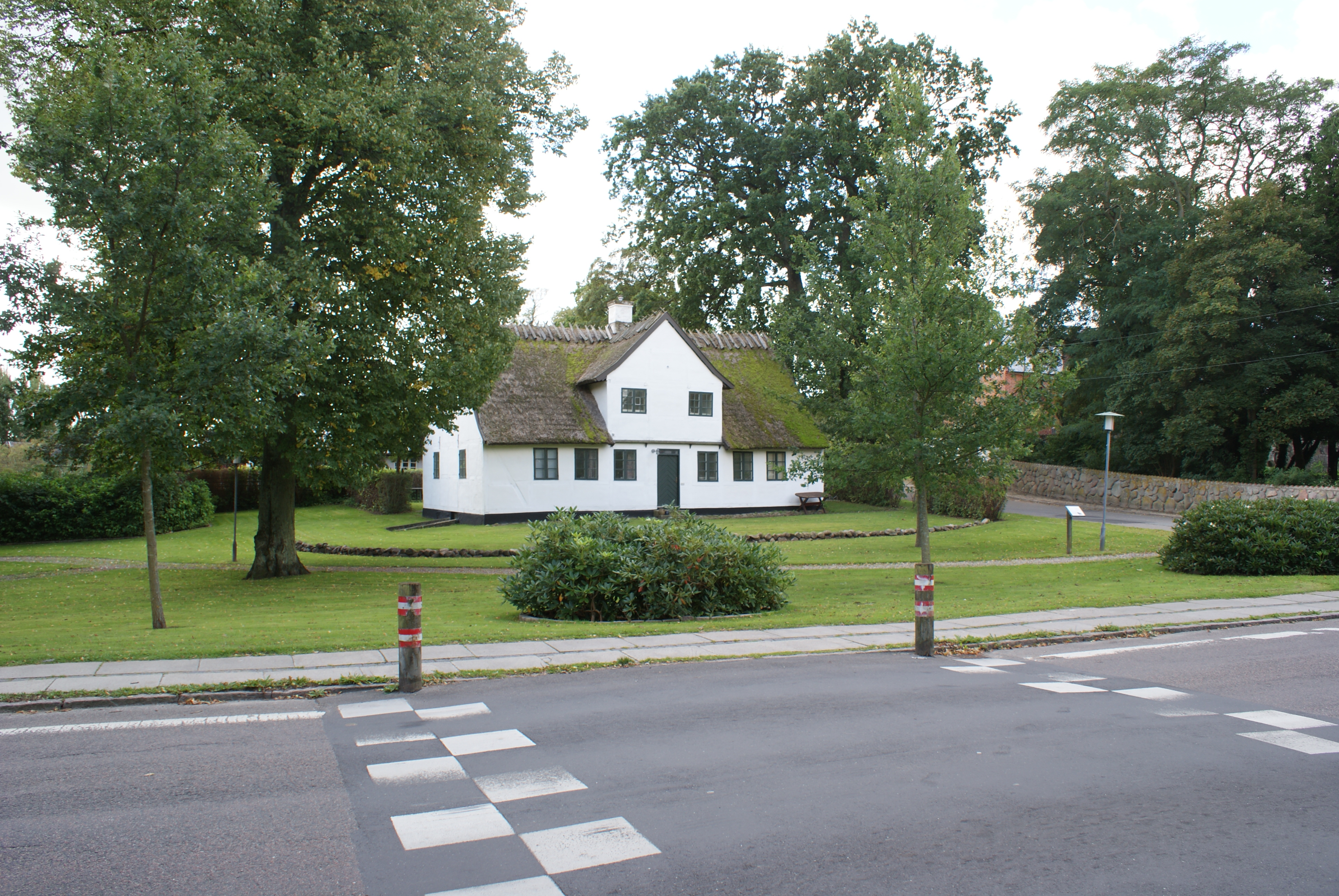
- Interactive map of the Melchior's Dower House area

General information
- Location: Engholmvej 1, 3660 Stenløse, Denmark
- Coordinates: 55°46′3.04″N 12°11′54.46″E
- Completed: 1802
- Renovated: 1998

Melchior's Dower House (Danish: Melchiors Enkesæde), situated in a small public greenspace at the corner of Byvej and Engholmvej in Stenløse, Egedal Municipality, some ten kilometres (6.2 mi) northwest of central Copenhagen, Denmark, was built to provide housing for widows of rectors, parish clerks and school teachers. Built in 1802, it is the second oldest building in Stenløse (after Stenløse Church). It was listed in the Danish registry of protected buildings and places in 1868.

== History ==
Albert Melchior (1732–1805) assumed the position as parish clerk (Danish: Degn) for the parishes of Stenløse and Veksø in 1761. He moved into the parish clerk's house (Degneboligen) but since the old parish clerk who had fallen ill was still alive for the first few years also had to house and care for him and his wife.

Melchior bought the parish clerk's house in 1785. He and his wife had no children. but opened their home to those in need. At the time of the 1887 census, their household included the wife's nephew, an illegitimate child from the Poor Law Authority (Fattigvæsenet), two physically disabled women aged 21 and 26 and a 61-year-old woman dependent on charity (almisselem).

Melchior's house burned down after his wife had died and he was then afforded a home in the local rectory. Money from the fire insurance enabled him to rebuild the house. He was granted royal permission to build a charitable dower house for widows of rectors, parish clerks and school teachers, which was completed in 1802.

The house contained two dwellings and was administrated by the local rector. It sat on an approximately two-hectare (4.9-acre) piece of land but the land was gradually sold off to pay for its maintenance. In 1968, it was acquired by Stenløse Municipality and the same year listed in the Danish registry of protected buildings and places. It had by then housed a total of 15 widows.

== Today ==
The building was renovated in 1998 and now contains a total of three apartments. The remaining land has been turned into a small public greenspace with a pond and large trees.
