= Smørumnedre =

Town and suburban area in Denmark

Coordinates: 55°44′N 12°18′E

Smørumnedre is a town and suburban area situated in Egedal Municipality in the northwestern outskirts of Copenhagen, Denmark and forms part of Copenhagen's urban area. The original village has merged with the neighbouring villages of Måløv in Ballerup Municipality and Jonstrup in Furesø Municipality to form an urban agglomeration with a population of 21,918 (1 January 2026). The small and relatively undisturbed village of Smørumovre ("Upper Smørum") is located about 500 metres to the west of Smørumnedre while Lille Smørum ("Little Smørum") refers to a group of scattered farms to the south. The three localities are collectively referred to as Smørum.

== History ==
The name Smørum is first recorded in Canute IV's gift letter to the Bishop of Lund from 1085. The first part of the name means "Butter" (Danish: Smør) while the suffix -rum means "place".

The village of Smørumnedre was originally smaller than the neighbouring village of Smørumovre but it was expanded with large areas of single family detached housing in the 1960s and 1970s. It was formerly the seat of Ledøje-Smørum Municipality which was merged with Ølstykke Municipality to form Egedal Municipality.

== Economy ==
Oticon, a major manufacturer of hearing aids, has its headquarters in Smørumnedre. The building was inaugurated in 2005. Novo opened Novo Nordisk Diabetes Center in Måløv in 1991 and now houses 2,300 employees. A new building, Diabetes Research House, broke ground in 2014 and was completed in 2016 at a cost of DKK 750 million.

== Sport ==
The local football club is Ledøje-Smørum Fodbold which plays in Danmarksserien. They play their home games at Smørum Park and Ledøje Stadium. Ledøje-Smørum Fodbold is part of Ledøje-Smørum Idrætsforening. Smørum Golf Club is based to the south of Smørumnedre.

== Smørumovre ==
Smørumovre boasts a well-preserved village environment. The village originally consisted of two rows of farms situated to the north and south of a village green with a small pond. The village green was later built over with various buildings, including a forge, an inn workshops and residences for field workers and craftsmen. The old school, which overlooks the pond, is now home to Ledøje-Smørum Local Historic Archives. Located on the eastern outskirts of Smørumovre, Smørum Church dates from c. 1170. The murals in the chancel and nave date from c. 1500. The manor house Edelgave is situated in the southwestern corner of the village. It was built in 1782–91 by Andreas Kirkerup.

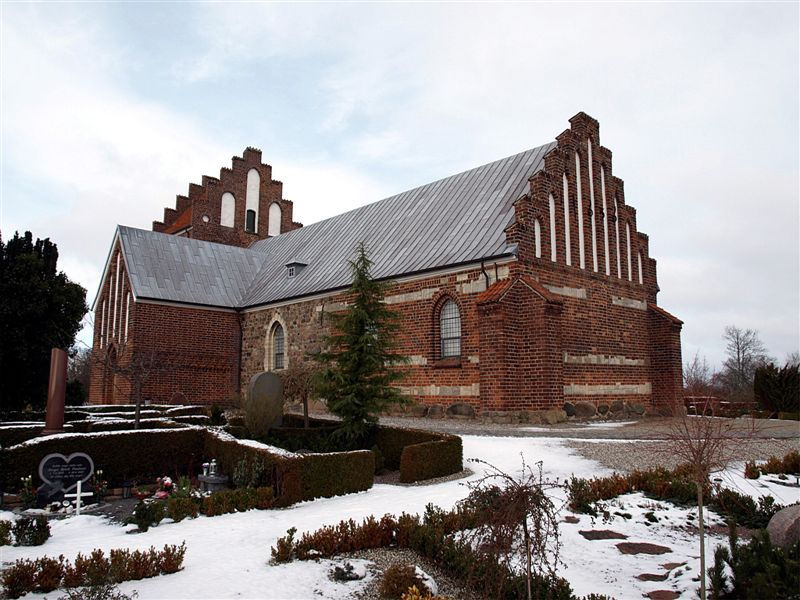
Smørum Church

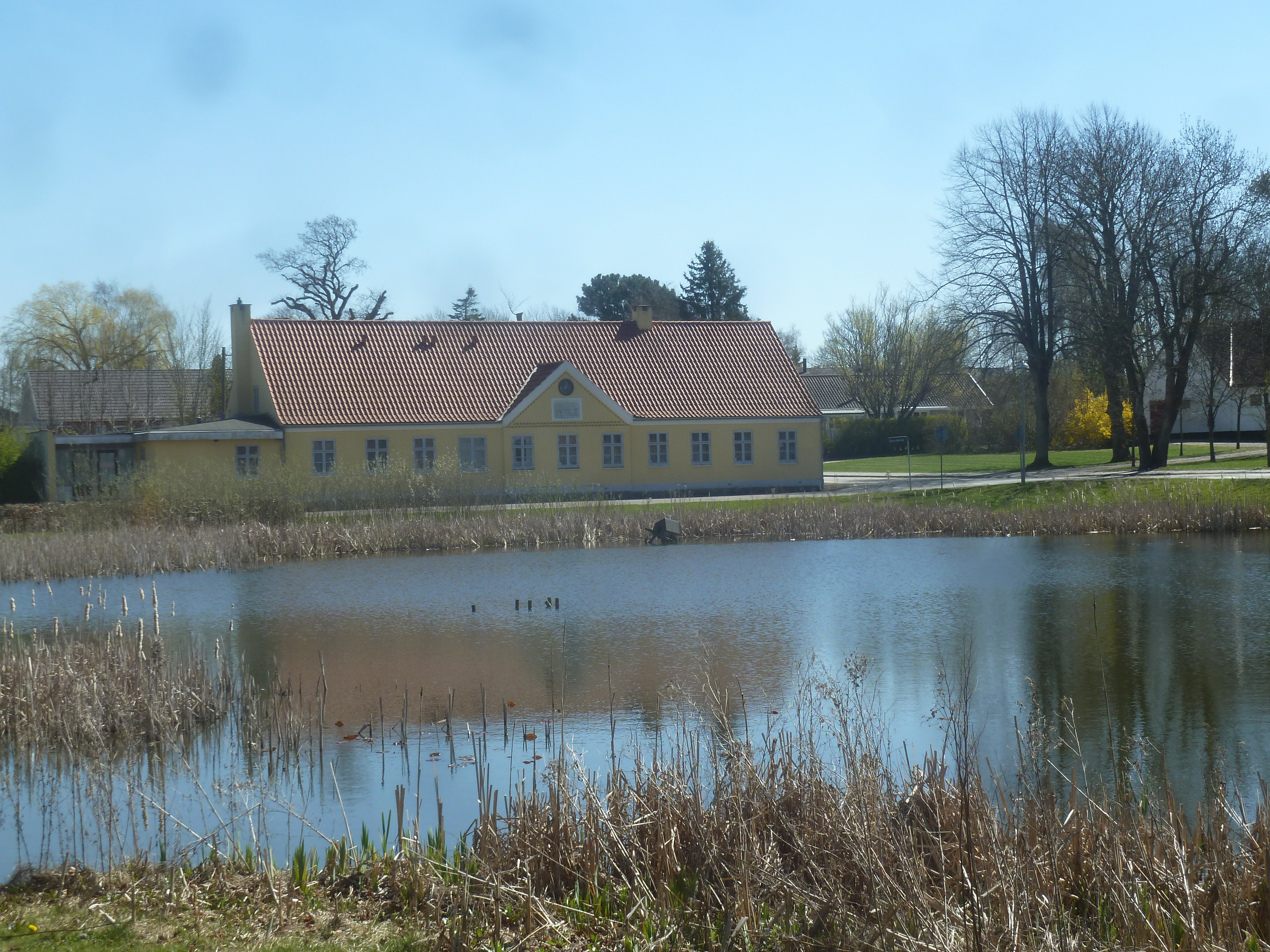
The old school in Smørumovre

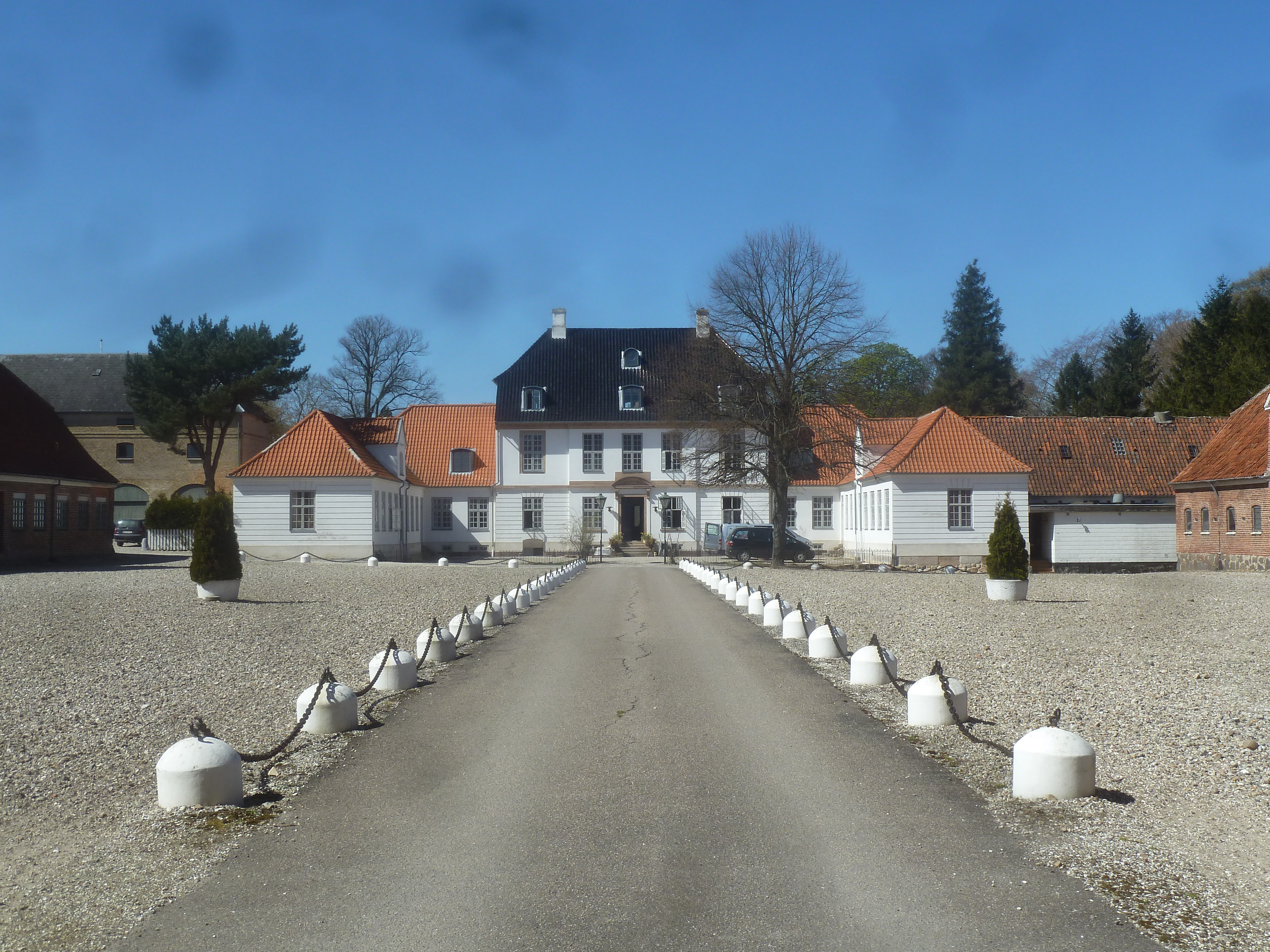
Edelgave

== Transport ==
Smørumnedre is served by two stations on the Frederikssund radial of the S-train network. Måløv station is served by the C and H trains and Kildedal station is served by the C trains. Frederikssundsvej passes Smørumnedre on its way from north-western Copenhagen to Frederikssund.

== Notable people ==
- Martin Albrechtsen (born 1980) a Danish former footballer, grew up in Smørumnedre
- Lasse Petry (born 1992 in Smørumnedre) a Danish former footballer
- Sebastian Gravlund (born 2004 in Smørumnedre) a Danish racing driver
