= Ølstykke Municipality =

Ølstykke
- Former municipality
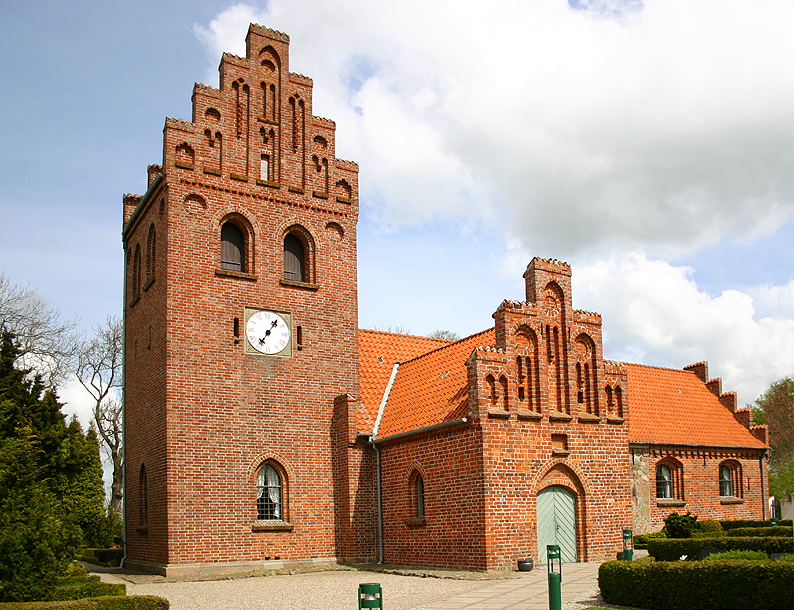
- Ølstykke church

- Location within Denmark
- Coordinates: 55°47′N 12°09′E
- Country: Denmark
- Region: Capital Region of Denmark
- Seat: Ølstykke

Population (2014)
  - Total: 16,681
- Time zone: UTC+1 (CET)
  - Summer (DST): UTC+2 (CEST)
- Postal codes: 3650
- Website: www.egedalkommune.dk

Ølstykke is a former municipality in Region Hovedstaden. The former Ølstykke municipality covered an area of 29 km^{2}, and had a total population of 15,358 (2005). Its last mayor was Svend Kjærgaard, a member of the Venstre (Liberal Party) political party.

On 1 January 2007, Ølstykke municipality ceased to exist as the result of Kommunalreformen ("The Municipality Reform" of 2007). It was merged with Ledøje-Smørum and Stenløse municipalities to form the new Egedal municipality. This created a municipality with an area of 126 km^{2} and a total population of 39,267 (2005).

== See also ==
- Ølstykke station
- Ølstykke FC
