= Henrik Kyhl =

Danish clockmaker and politician

Henrik Larsen Kyhl (8 August 1793 – 12 February 1866) was a Danish clockmaker, politician and the second managing director of Tivoli Gardens in Copenhagen.

== Early life and education ==
Kyhl was born on 8 August 1793 in Søsum at Ølstykke, the son of wheelmaker Lars Henrik Hansen (c. 1764 – 1812) and Maren Jensdatter (c. 1773 – 1841). He apprenticed as a clockmaker in Copenhagen.

== Career as clockmaker ==
In 1818, Kyhl opened his own workshop which specialized in tower clocks. Over the years, he presented a number of inventions and improvements in the Magazin for Kunstnere og Haandværkere (Magazine for Artists and Craftsmen). Kyhl was alderman of the Clockmakers' Guild in Copenhagen from 1832 to 1838. A tower clock presented at the Great Exhibition in London in 1851 attracted considerable attention. It was later installed in the Methodist St. Paul's Church in Rigensgade in Copenhagen.

In 1827, Kyhl constructed a reflector lamp which was used as street lighting in Copenhagen from 1828 until gas lights were introduced in 1857.

== Other occupations ==
In 1835, he was a co-founder of Industriforeningen. He was also one of the most active members of its board of representatives. In 1843, he was a co-founder of the Scandinavian Society. He was elected to the Committee for Copenhagen the same year (valgbestyrelsen for København).

Kyhl was from the foundation of the amusement park also a board member of Tivoli Gardens. He was often in opposition to Georg Carstensen, whom he succeeded as managing director of the park until 1857.

== Politics ==
From 1837 to 1859, Kyhl was a member of the Copenhagen City Council. In 1841, he unsuccessfully proposed surfacing the streets in Copenhagen with asphalt. In 1935, he was a co-founder of the Society for the Freedom of the Press (Selskabet til trykkefrihedens rette brug). In 1844 and again in 1846, he was an alternate member of the Roskilde Constituent Assembly (Stænderforsamling), where he argued in favour of a free constitution.

== Selected tower clocks ==
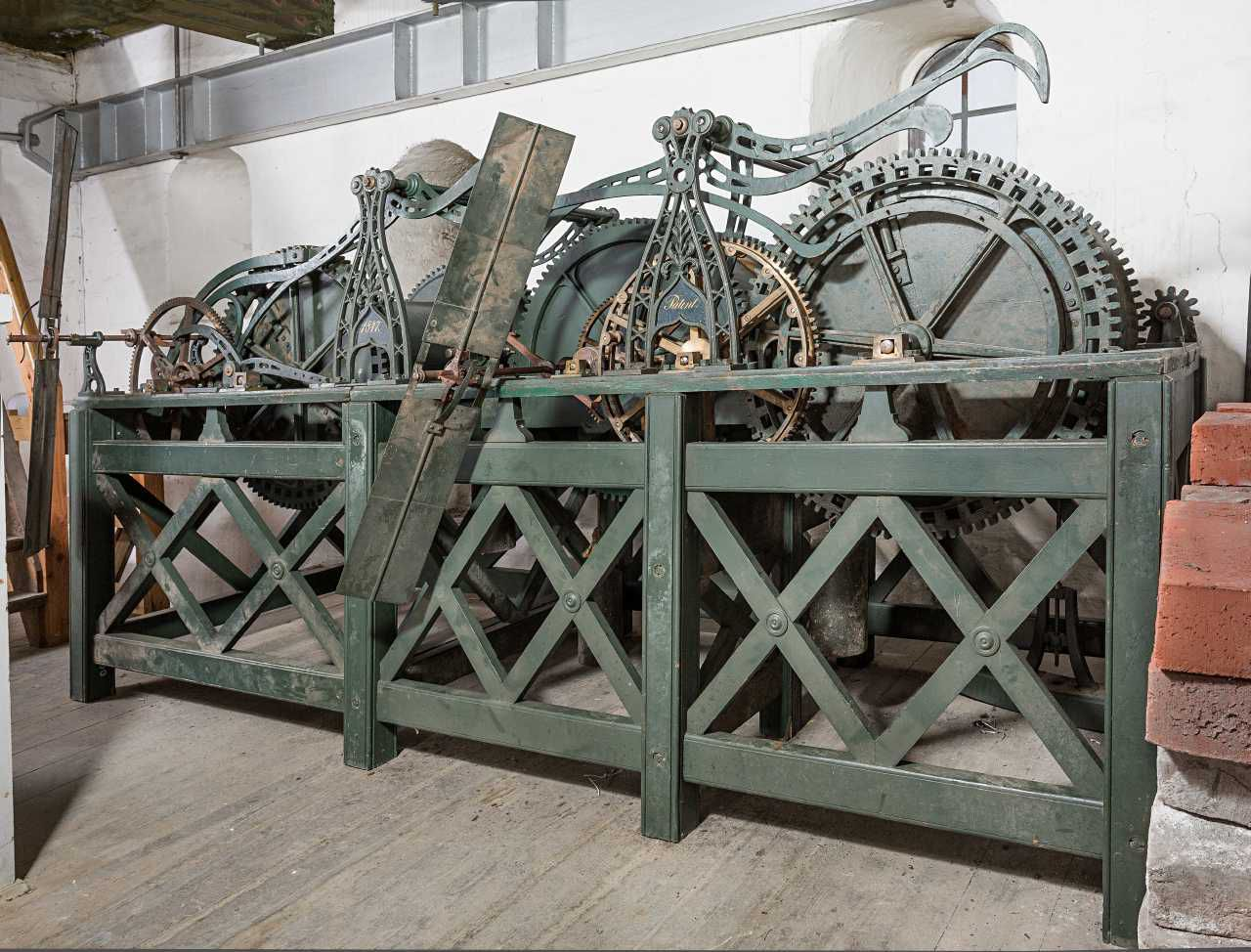
Kyhl's tower clock in the Church of Our Lady, Nyborg

Kyhl has created tower clocks for the following buildings:

- Mariager Town Hall, Mariager (1846)
- Church of Our Lady, Nyborg (1847)
- Wedellsborg, Aarhus (1848)
- Øresundshospitalet, Østerbrogade, Copenhagen (1848)
- Vester Sottrup Church, Sønderjylland (1848)
- Royal Veterinary and Agricultural College, Frederiksberg (1854)
- Jægerspris Castle, Jægerspris (1855)
- Vridsløselille Prison, Vridsløselille (1860)
- Roskilde Hospital, Roskilde (1856)
- Ebeltoft Church, Ebeltoft (1860)
- Helsingør City Hall, Helsingør (1853)
- Holtug Church, Stevns
- Cottagehuset, Charlottenlund

== See also ==
- Peter Mathiesen
