= Veksø railway station =

Railway station in Egedal Municipality, Denmark

Veksø
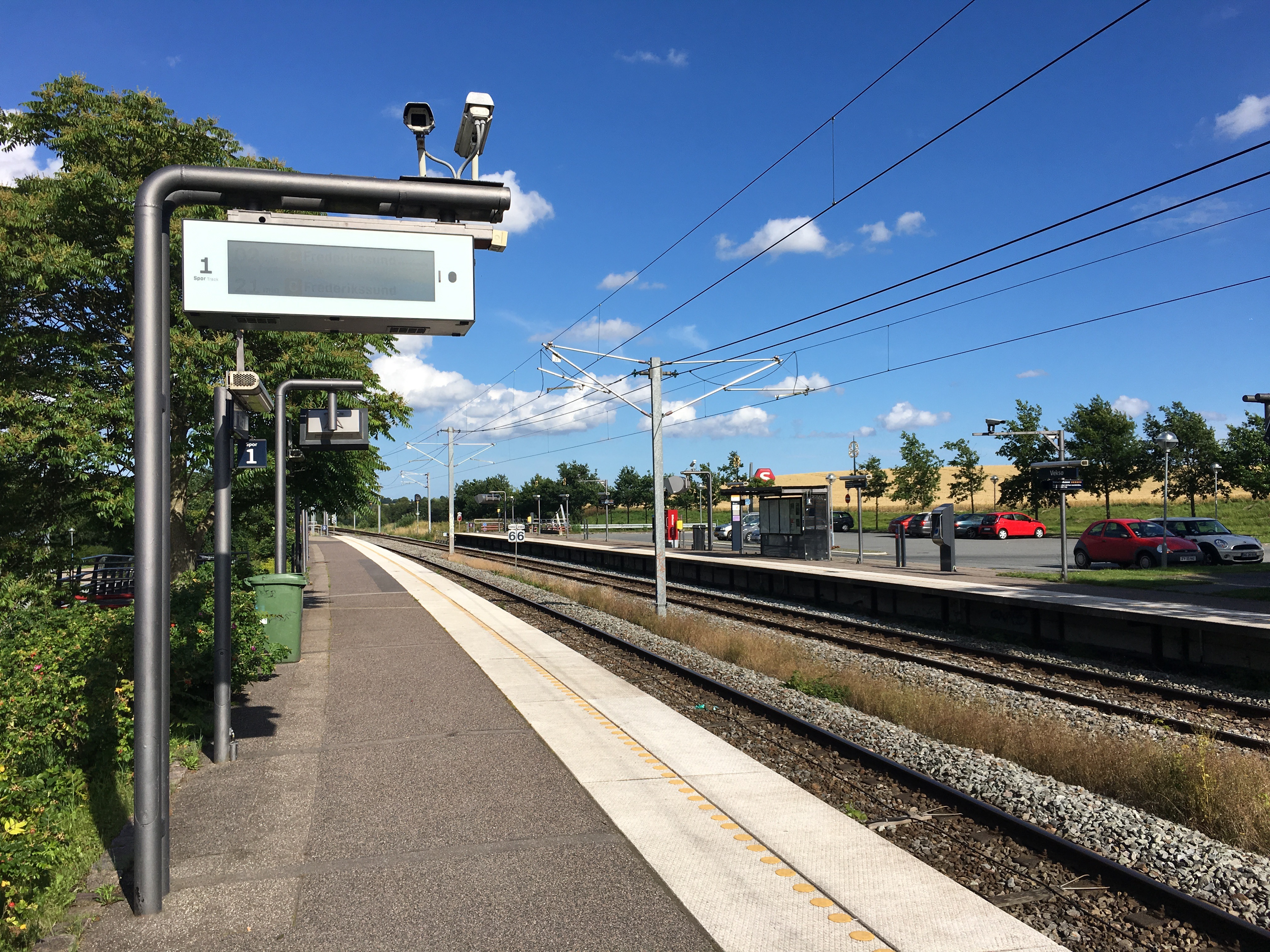
- Veksø station in 2017

General information
- Location: Stationsvej 2; 3670 Veksø; Egedal Municipality; Denmark
- Coordinates: 55°45′00″N 12°14′24″E
- Elevation: 13.1 metres (43 ft)
- Owner: DSB (station infrastructure); Banedanmark (rail infrastructure)
- Platforms: 2 side platforms
- Tracks: 2
- Train operators: DSB

Other information
- Station code: Vs
- Fare zone: 63/74

History
- Opened: 17 June 1879; 147 years ago
- Rebuilt: 28 May 1989 (S-train)
- Electrified: 1989 (S-train)

Services
| Preceding station | S-train | Following station |
|---|---|---|
| Kildedal towards Klampenborg | C | Stenløse towards Frederikssund |
| Måløv towards Klampenborg | C Evening trains | Stenløse towards Frederikssund |
| Kildedal One-way operation | H Special early morning trains Departs from Frederikssund at 04:37, 04:57, 05:17 (Mon–Fri) | Stenløse towards Frederikssund |
Location

Veksø station is an S-train railway station located to the south of the town of Veksø northwest of Copenhagen, Denmark. The station is located on the Frederikssund radial of Copenhagen's S-train network.

The station was designed by Simon Peter Christian Bendtsen. He has also designed some other stations such as: Herlev, Måløv and Ølstykke.

== History ==
On 5 June 1879, the first train rolled into the station. On 15 June 1879, it was inaugurated.

== Cultural references ==
The station is used as a location in the 1968 film Mig og min lillebror og storsmuglerne.

== See also ==
- List of Copenhagen S-train stations
- List of railway stations in Denmark
- Rail transport in Denmark
