= Listed buildings in Egedal Municipality =

This is a list of listed buildings in Egedal Municipality, Denmark.

== The list ==
| Listing name | Image | Location | Coordinates | Description |
|---|---|---|---|---|
| Edelgave | | Edelgavevej 28, 2765 Smørum | 55°43′31.92″N 12°15′23.81″E | House from 1782-91 designed by Andreas Kirkerup |
| Melchior's Downer House | | Engholmvej 1, 3660 Stenløse | 55°46′3.05″N 12°11′54.44″E | A half-timbered, 10-bay house from the 18th century |
