= Egedal railway station =

Railway station in Egedal Municipality, Denmark

Egedal
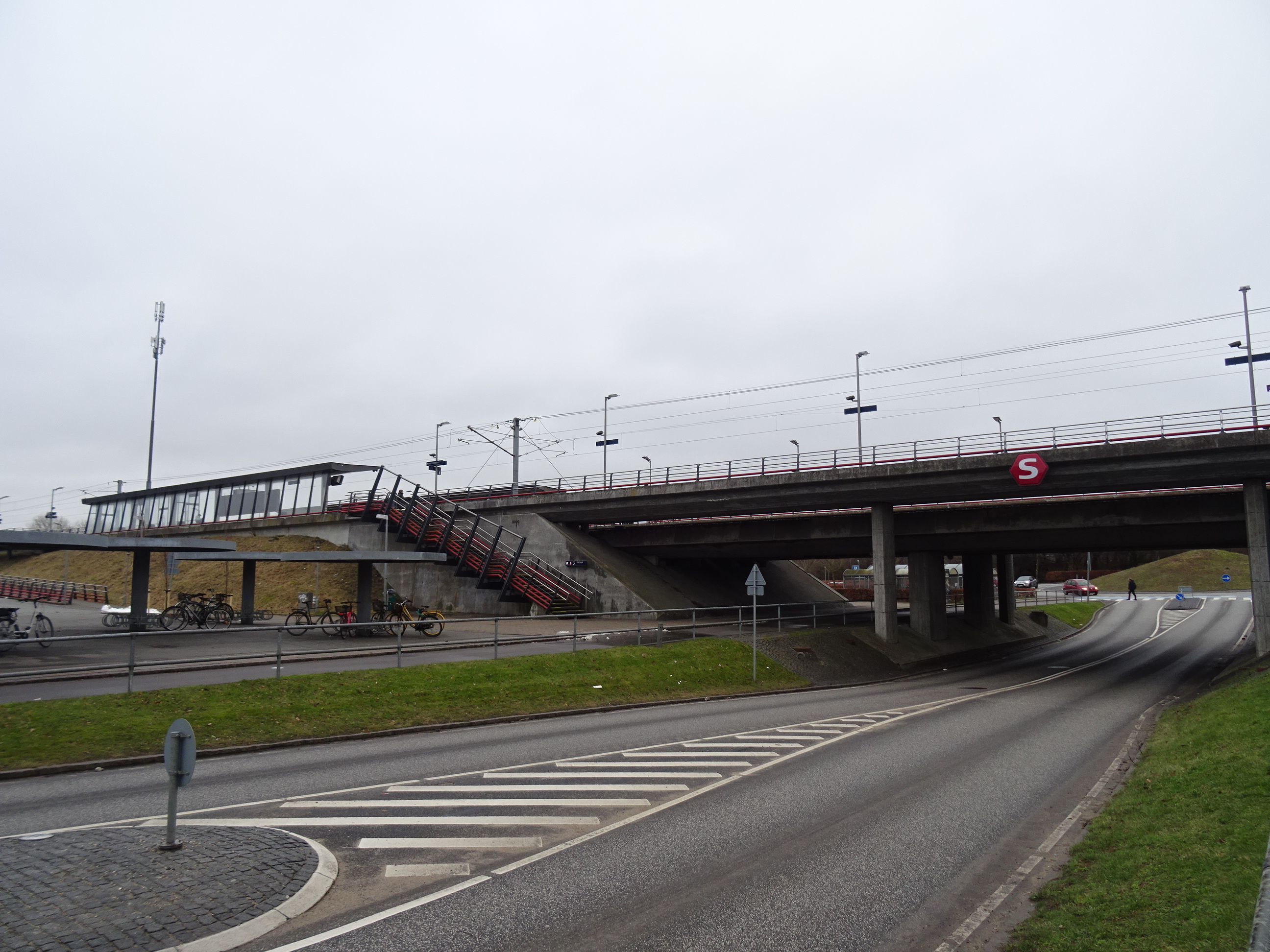
- Egedal station in 2024

General information
- Location: Dronning Ingrids Vej 1; 3650 Ølstykke; Egedal Municipality; Denmark
- Coordinates: 55°46′47″N 12°11′8″E
- Elevation: 22.8 metres (75 ft)
- Owner: DSB (station infrastructure); Banedanmark (rail infrastructure)
- Platforms: 2 side platforms
- Tracks: 2
- Train operators: DSB
- Bus routes: 312, 314

Other information
- Station code: Gtg
- Fare zone: 85

History
- Opened: 14 September 2002; 23 years ago
- Former names: Gl. Toftegård (2002-2011)

Services
Preceding station	S-train	Following station
Stenløse towards Klampenborg	C	Ølstykke towards Frederikssund
Stenløse One-way operation	H Special early morning trains Departs from Frederikssund at 04:37, 04:57, 05:17 (Mon–Fri)	Ølstykke towards Frederikssund
Location

Egedal station is an S-train railway station serving the district of Gammel Ølstykke in the central part of the satellite town of Ølstykke-Stenløse northwest of Copenhagen, Denmark.

Egedal station is located on the Frederikssund radial of Copenhagen's S-train network. In 2011 it changed name from Gl. Toftegård Station to Egedal station.

== See also ==
- List of Copenhagen S-train stations
- List of railway stations in Denmark
