= Stenløse railway station =

Railway station in Egedal Municipality, Denmark

Stenløse
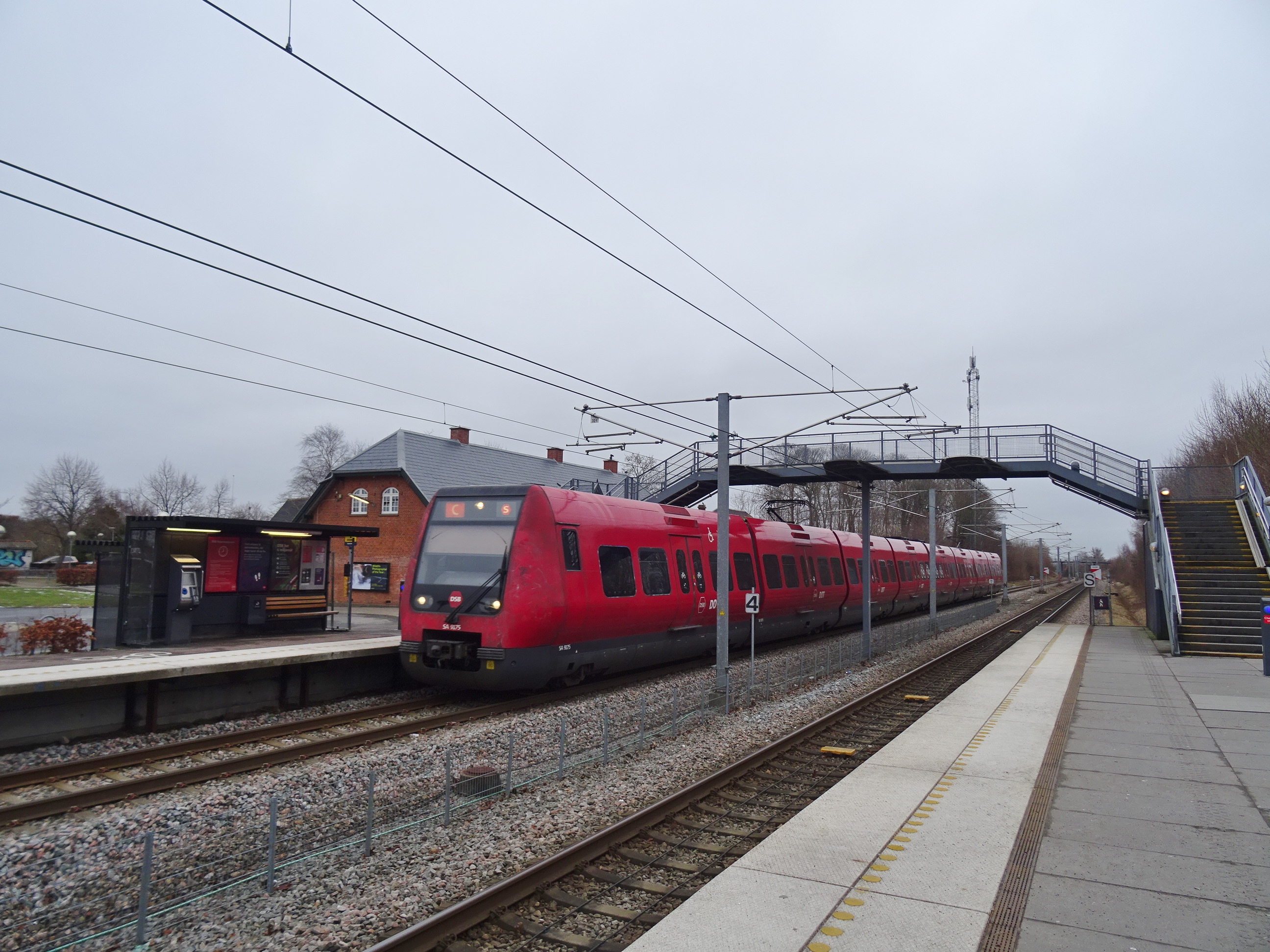
- Stenløse station in 2024.

General information
- Location: Stationspladsen 2; 3660 Stenløse; Egedal Municipality; Denmark
- Coordinates: 55°46′01″N 12°11′24″E
- Elevation: 16.7 metres (55 ft)
- Owner: DSB (station infrastructure); Banedanmark (rail infrastructure)
- Line: Frederikssund Line
- Platforms: 2 side platforms
- Tracks: 2
- Train operators: DSB
- Bus routes: 312, 334, 358

Other information
- Station code: St
- Fare zone: 74/85
- Website: Official website

History
- Opened: 18 February 1882; 144 years ago
- Rebuilt: 28 May 1989 (S-train)
- Electrified: 1989 (S-train)

Services
Preceding station	S-train	Following station
Veksø towards Klampenborg	C	Egedal towards Frederikssund
Veksø One-way operation	H Special early morning trains Departs from Frederikssund at 04:37, 04:57, 05:17 (Mon–Fri)	Egedal towards Frederikssund
Location

Stenløse station is an S-train railway station serving the district of Stenløse in the southeastern part of the satellite town of Ølstykke-Stenløse northwest of Copenhagen, Denmark. It is located on the Frederikssund radial of the S-train network, a hybrid commuter rail and rapid transit system in and around Greater Copenhagen. It is served regularly by trains on the C-line which have a journey time to central Copenhagen of around 40 minutes. The station opened in 1882, and has been served by the S-train network since 1989.

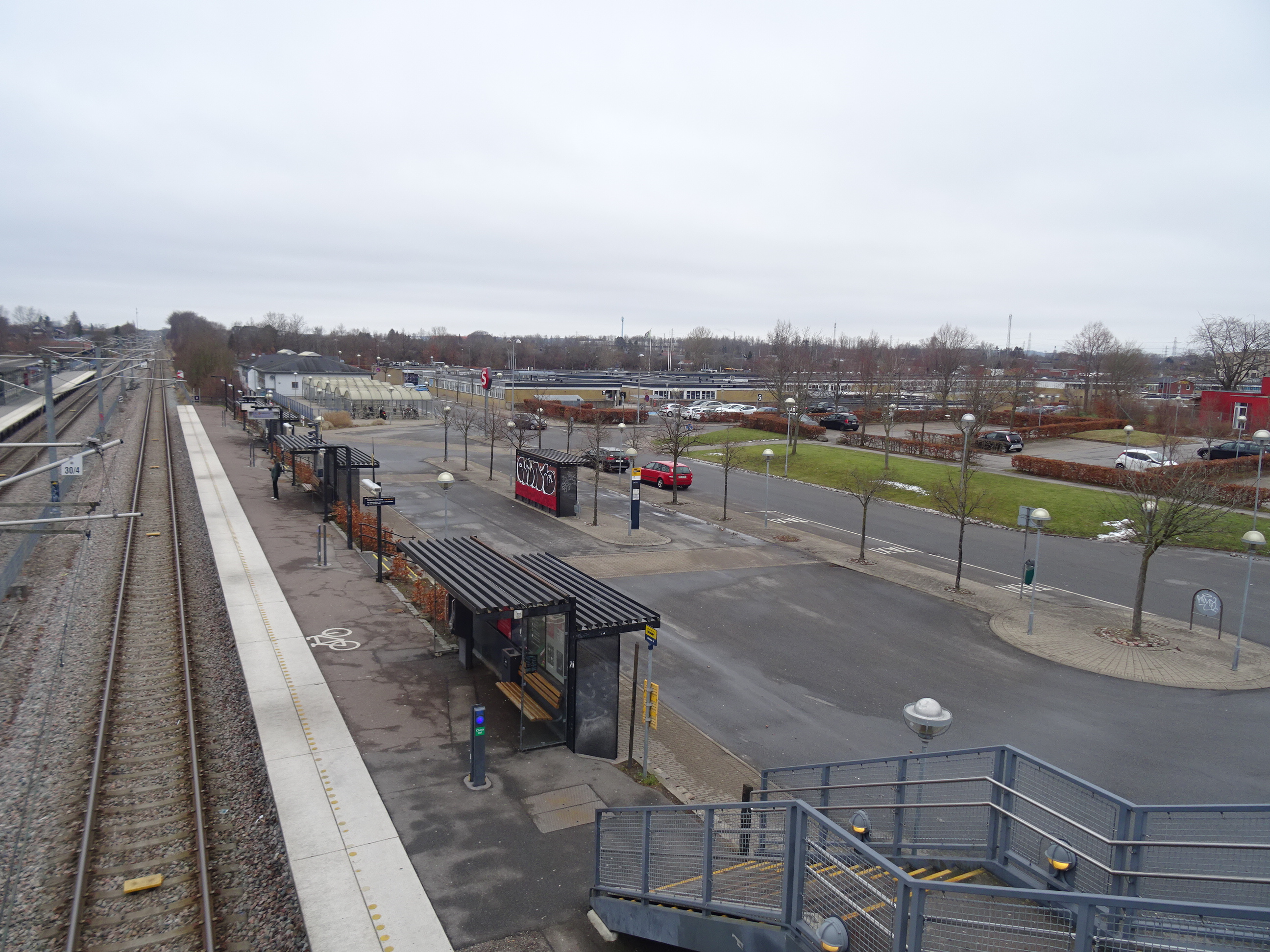
The station forecourt

== See also ==
- List of Copenhagen S-train stations
- List of railway stations in Denmark
- Transport in Copenhagen
