= Kildedal railway station =

Railway station in Greater Copenhagen, Denmark

Kildedal
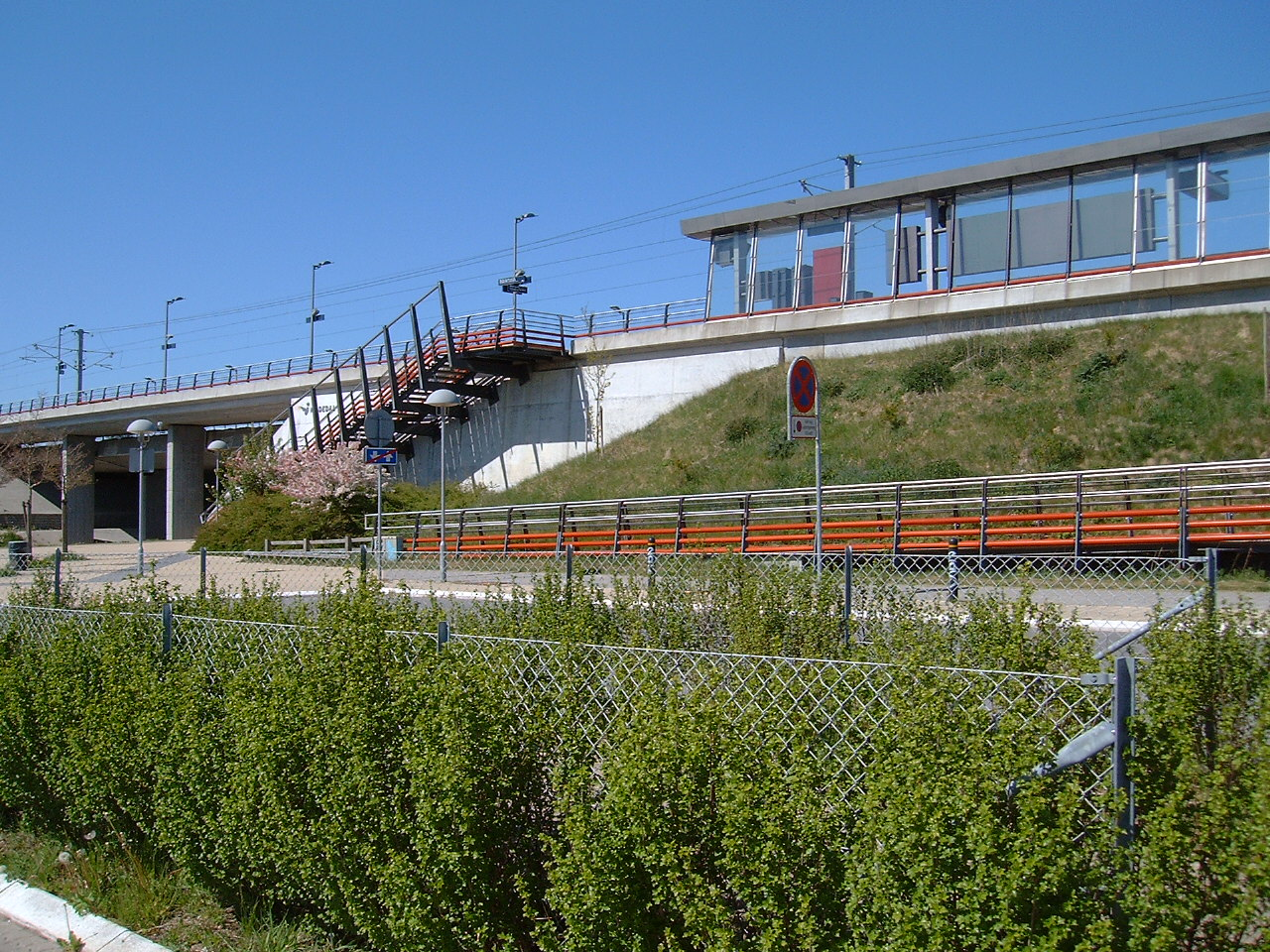

General information
- Location: Kildedalsvej 1; 2760 Måløv; Ballerup Municipality; Denmark
- Coordinates: 55°45′07″N 12°17′10″E
- Elevation: 18.0 metres (59.1 ft)
- Owner: DSB (station infrastructure); Banedanmark (rail infrastructure)
- Platforms: 2 side platforms
- Tracks: 2
- Train operators: DSB
- Bus routes: 158

Other information
- Station code: Kid
- Fare zone: 63/53

History
- Opened: 25 November 2000; 25 years ago

Services
Preceding station	S-train	Following station
Måløv towards Klampenborg	C	Veksø towards Frederikssund
Måløv One-way operation	H Special early morning trains Departs from Frederikssund at 04:37, 04:57, 05:17 (Mon–Fri)	Veksø towards Frederikssund
Location

Kildedal station is a station on the Frederikssund radial of the S-train network in Copenhagen, Denmark.

The station opened on 25 November 2000 in expectation of nearby urban development. It is still surrounded mostly by fields and has failed to attract any significant number of passengers. Since 23 September 2007 trains only stop at Kildedal on Monday through Saturday in the periods when service C is extended from Ballerup to Frederikssund. It was the only S-train station not to have service every day of the week. Since December 2012, this station has restored weekend service, and no train stops there on weekday evenings.

Weekday traffic stops here to unload employees who work in a nearby industrial park area, which is the site of the head offices and production facilities and of companies which include Oticon, Falck, Eva Denmark, Cidex, Formula Tryxager, Vangsgaard and Novo Nordisk.

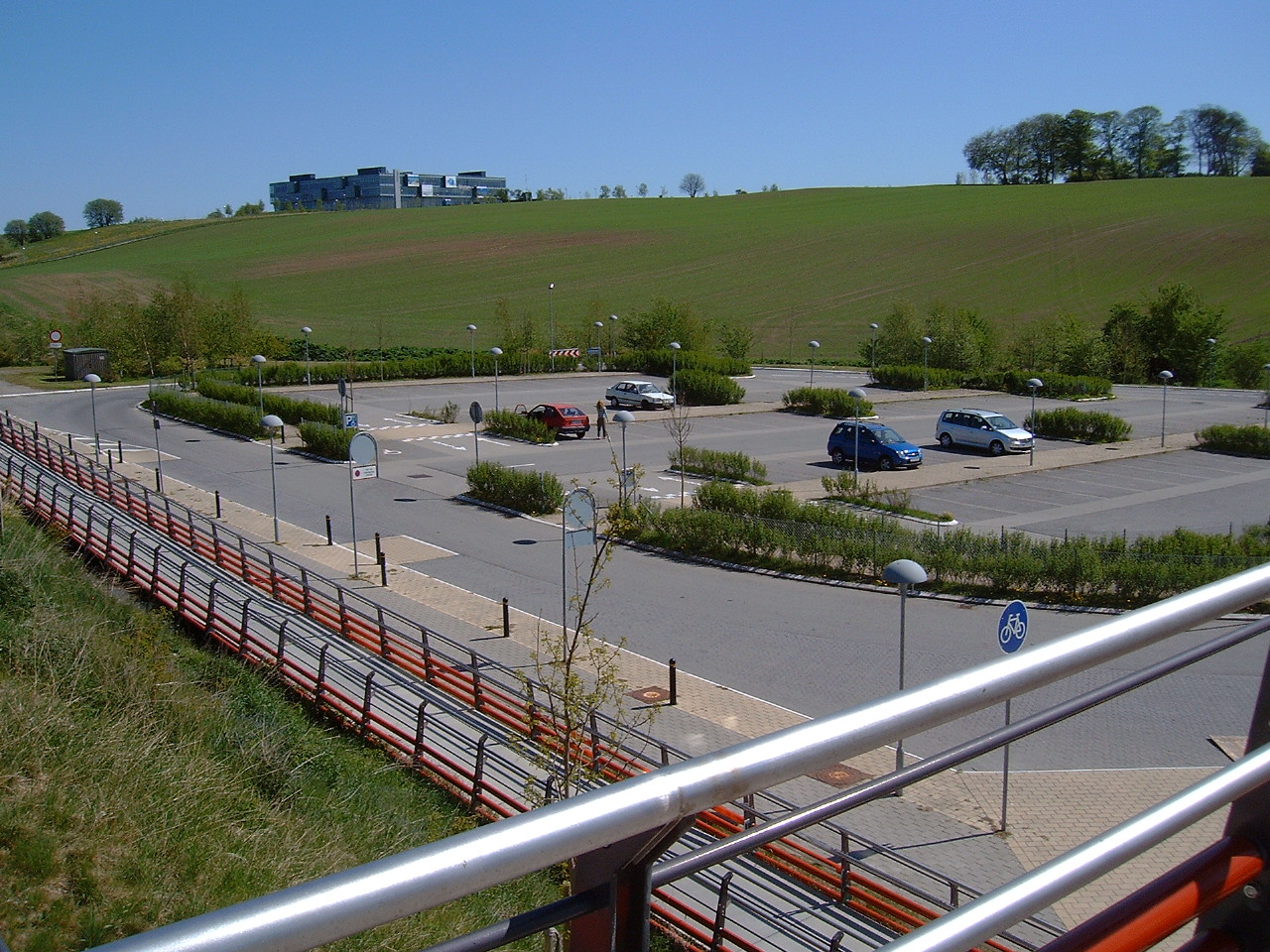
Quiet parking lot on the south side of the station, with the Oticon building in the background

== See also ==
- List of Copenhagen S-train stations
- List of railway stations in Denmark
