= Måløv railway station =

Railway station in Greater Copenhagen, Denmark

Måløv
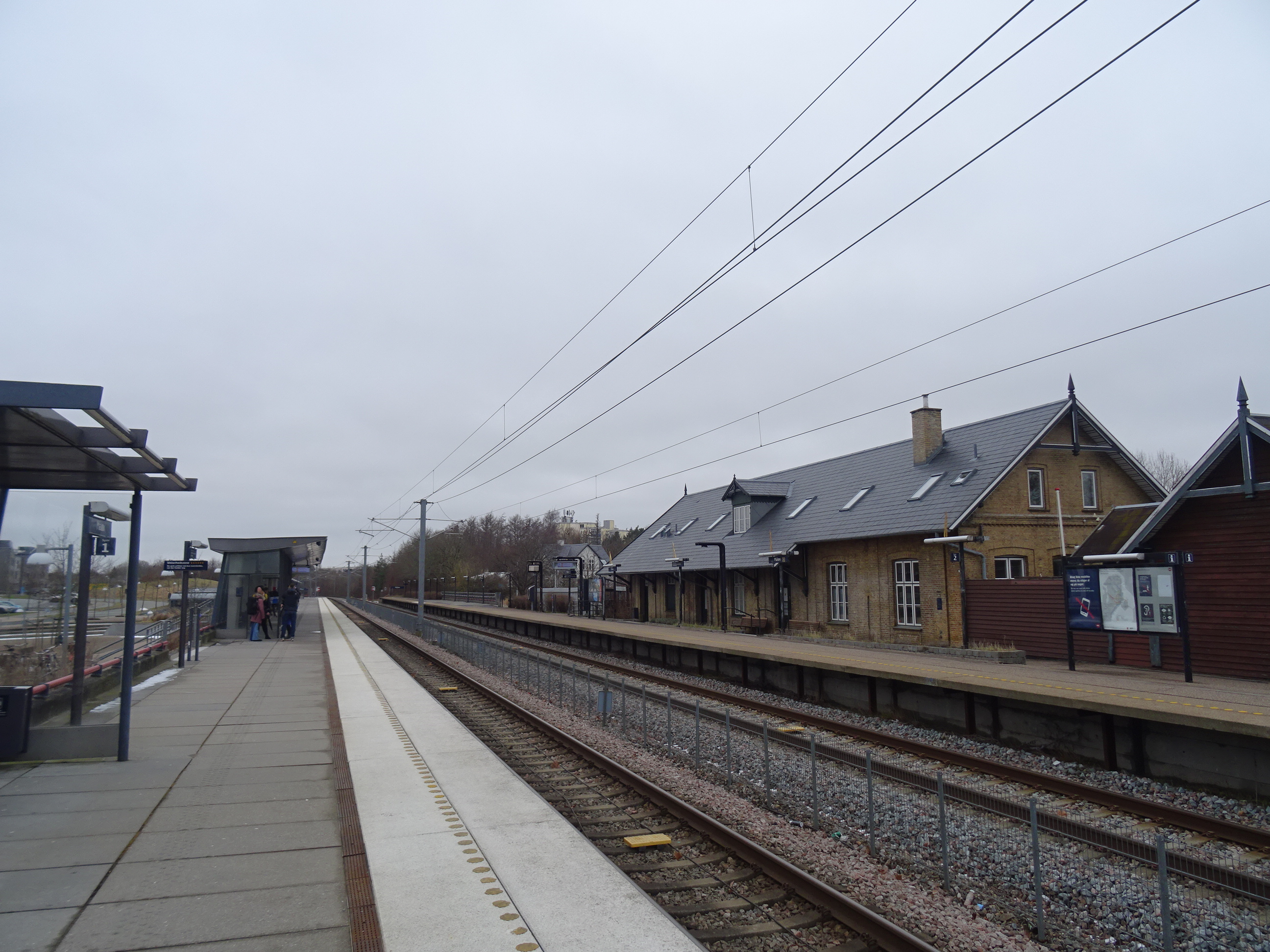
- Måløv Station in 2024

General information
- Location: Måløv Stationsplads 10; 2760 Måløv; Ballerup Municipality; Denmark
- Coordinates: 55.7475°N 12.3175°E
- Elevation: 27.3 metres (90 ft)
- Owner: DSB (station infrastructure); Banedanmark (rail infrastructure)
- Platforms: 2 side platforms
- Tracks: 2
- Train operators: DSB
- Bus routes: 147, 152, 157, 158, 163, 835

Other information
- Station code: Mw
- Fare zone: 53
- Website: Official website

History
- Opened: 17 June 1879; 147 years ago
- Rebuilt: 28 May 1989 (S-train)
- Electrified: 1989 (S-train)

Services
Preceding station	S-train	Following station
Ballerup towards Klampenborg	C	Kildedal towards Frederikssund
Ballerup One-way operation	H Special early morning trains Departs from Frederikssund at 04:37, 04:57, 05:17 (Mon–Fri)	Kildedal towards Frederikssund
Location

Måløv station is an S-train railway station serving the suburb of Måløv northwest of Copenhagen, Denmark. It is located on the Frederikssund radial of Copenhagen's S-train network.

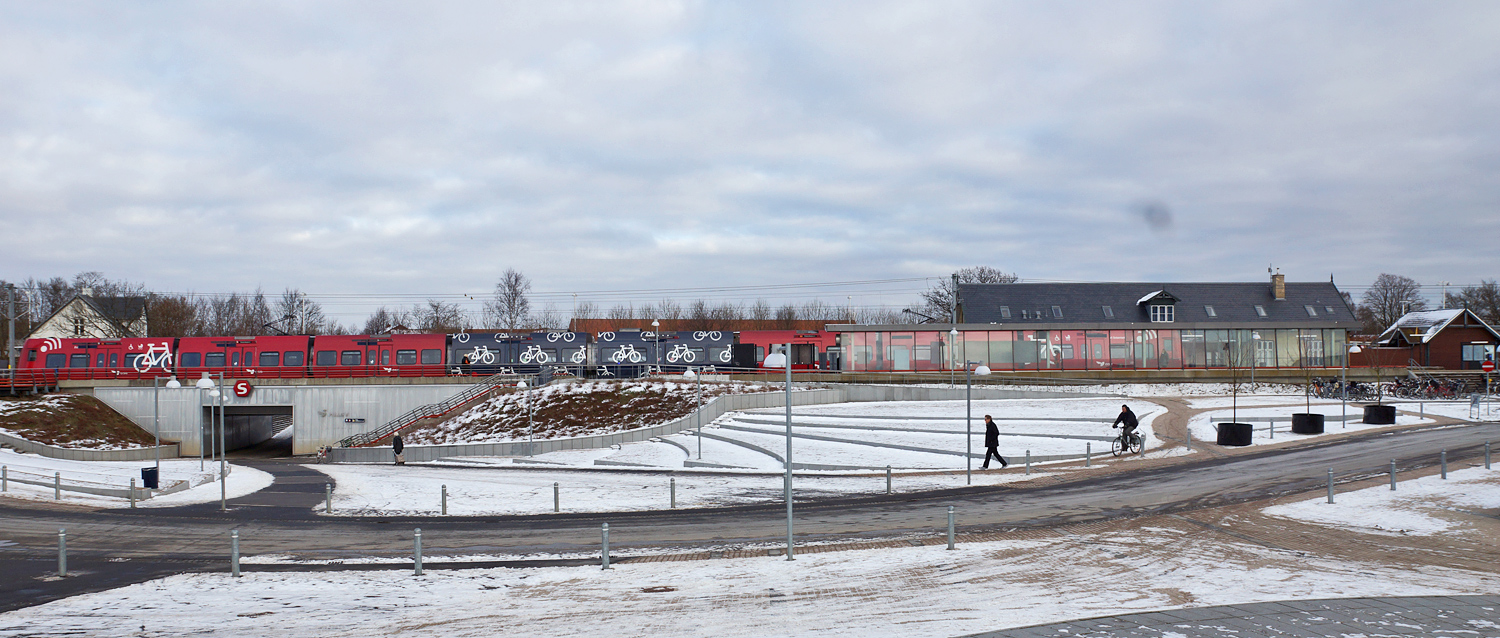
Måløv station seen from the south in 2013

== History ==
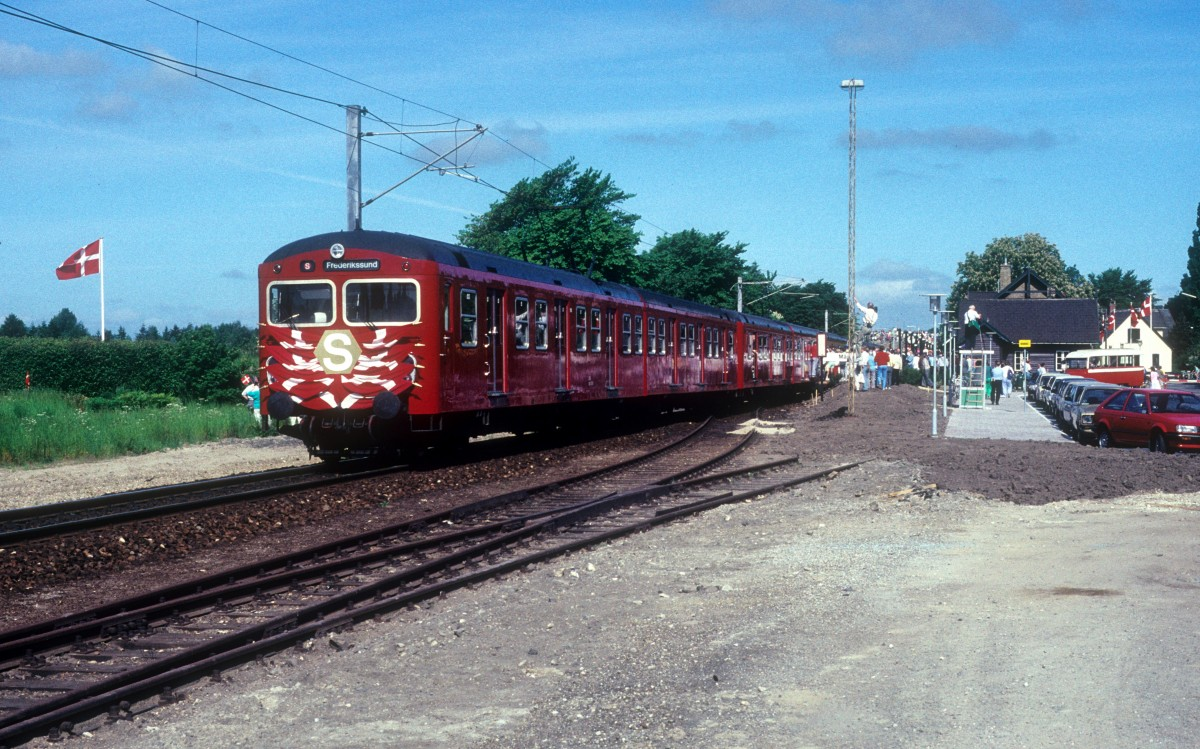
The inaugural S-train at Måløv station on 27 May 1989.

Måløv station was built by Det Sjællandske Jernbaneselskab (the Railway Company of Zealand, now Danish State Railways) and opened 17 June 1879 between Frederikssund and Frederiksberg. On 1 January 1880, the railway station was taken over by the Danish state along with the Zealand Railway Company. And on 1 October 1885, it became part of the new national railway company, the Danish State Railways.

The railway line was electrified in 1989 and the traffic was transferred to the S-train network. In 2002, the railway line became double tracked in its whole length.

== Architecture ==
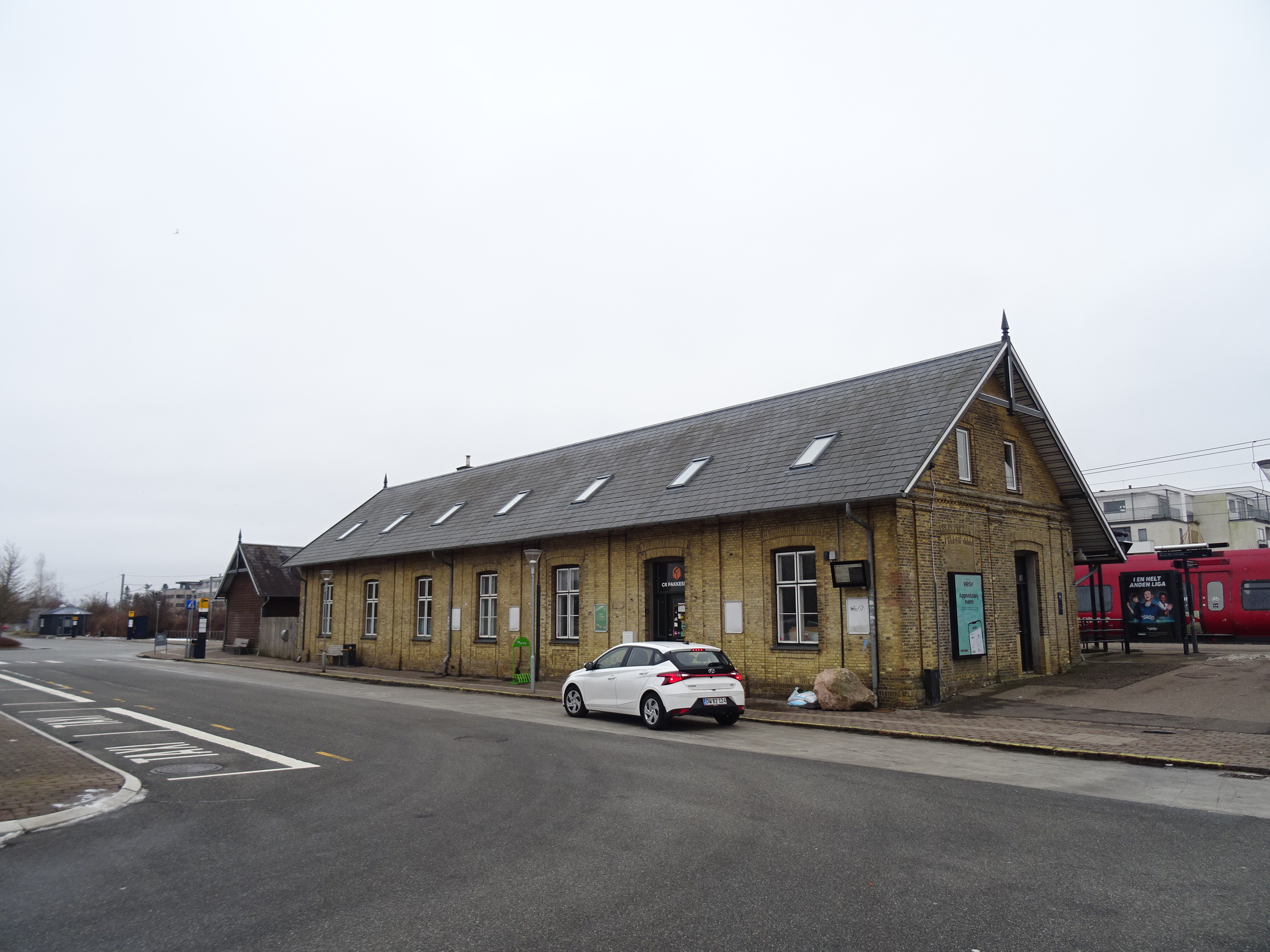
Street facade of the station building in 2024.

The station building is also from 1879 when 4 stations were built according to the same plan: Herlev station, Måløv station, Veksø station and Ølstykke station. Like the other station buildings of the Frederikssund Line they were built to a design by the Danish architect Simon Peter Christian Bendtsen.

== Services ==
Måløv station is served regularly by trains on the C-line of Copenhagen's S-train network which run between Frederikssund and Klampenborg via central Copenhagen.

== See also ==
- List of Copenhagen S-train stations
- List of railway stations in Denmark
- Rail transport in Denmark
- History of rail transport in Denmark
- Transportation in Copenhagen
- Transportation in Denmark
