= Stenløse Municipality =

Former municipality in Frederiksborg, Denmark

Coordinates: 55°046′02″N 12°011′050″E

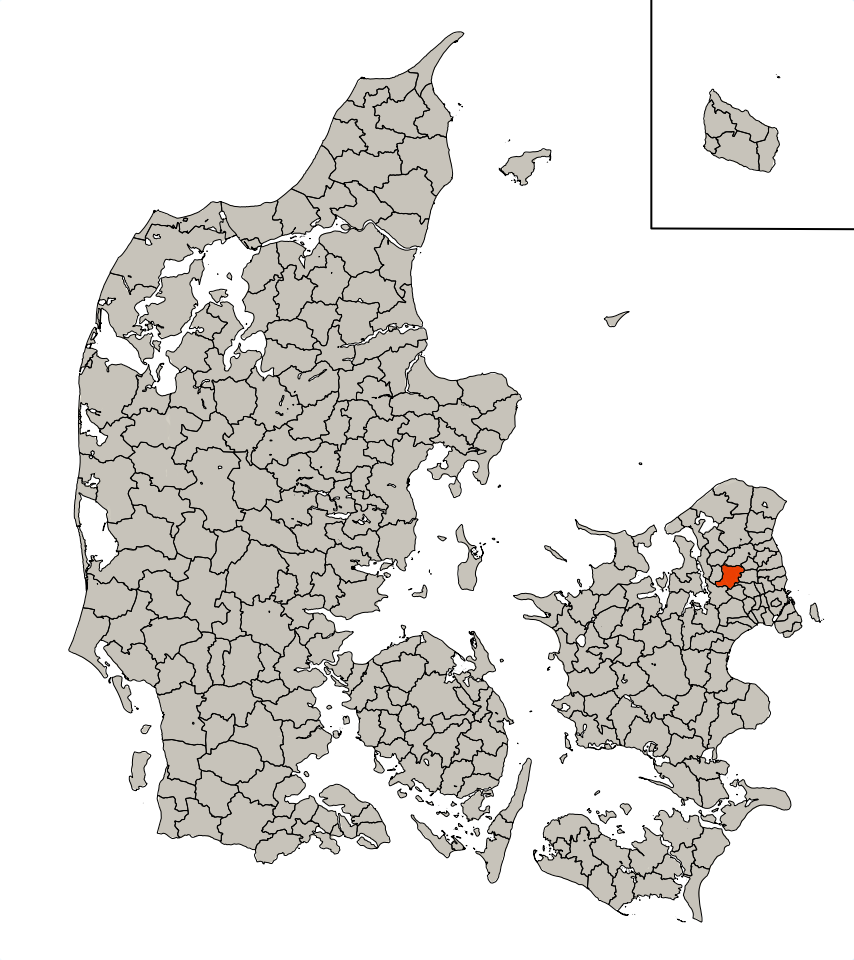
Stenløse Municipality's location in Denmark, 1970–2006

The former Stenløse Municipality (Danish: Stenløse Kommune) covered an area of 65 km^{2} (25 sq mi), and had a total population of 13,384 (2005).

Main town was Stenløse.

== History ==
On 1 January 2007 Stenløse municipality ceased to exist as the result of Kommunalreformen ("The Municipality Reform" of 2007). It was merged with Ledøje-Smørum and Ølstykke municipalities to form the new Egedal Municipality. This created a municipality with an area of 126 km^{2} (49 sq mi) and a total population of 39,267 (2005).

In 2006, the neighboring municipalities were Ledøje-Smørum to the southeast, Ølstykke to the west (now both merged into Egedal municipality), Ballerup and Værløse to the east, Farum to the northeast, Allerød to the north, Slangerup to the northwest, and Gundsø to the south.
