= Buresø (town) =

- Town
- Location within Denmark
- Coordinates: 55°48′49″N 12°13′53″E
- Country: Denmark
- Region: Capital Region of Denmark
- Municipality: Egedal Municipality

Area
  - Urban: 0.9 km^{2} (0.35 sq mi)

Population (2026)
  - Urban: 453
  - Urban density: 500/km^{2} (1,300/sq mi)
- Time zone: UTC+1 (CET)
  - Summer (DST): UTC+2 (CEST)
- Postal codes: 3550
- Website: www.egedalkommune.dk

Buresø, is a small town in Egedal Municipality. It has a population of 453 (2026). The town is located on the northern part of the island of Zealand (Sjælland), in eastern Denmark.
