= Vicky Holst Rasmussen =

Danish politician (born 1977)

Mayor of Egedal Municipality
- Incumbent
- Assumed office 1 January 2022
- Preceded by: Karsten Sondergaard

Personal details
- Born: 6 July 1977 (age 48)
- Party: Social Democrats

Vicky Holst Rasmussen (born 6 July 1977) is a Danish Social Democrats politician who has been the mayor of Egedal Municipality since 1 January 2022.

== Biography ==
Vicky Holst Rasmussen has been a city council member in Egedal since 2006. She became the new lead candidate for the Social Democrats in the municipality up to the 2021 Danish local elections where she took over the position from her father, the then 1st Deputy Mayor Ib Sørensen. After the election, she was first included in a constitutional agreement between the Venstre, the Social Democrats, the Conservative People's Party and the Danish Social Liberal Party, which meant that the incumbent mayor Karsten Søndergaard would remain mayor. However, the agreement only lasted three days, and on 20 November 2021, the Social Democrats, the Local List of Ny Egedal, the Conservatives, the Green Left and the Red–Green Alliance entered into a new constitutional agreement that made Vicky Holst Rasmussen the new mayor.

Vicky Holst Rasmussen is married and has two children. She was a professional case manager at HK Denmark from 2009 until she became mayor.

In July 2023, she became a Knight of the Order of the Dannebrog.

She was a candidate in the 2025 Egedal municipal election. She was defeated by Birgitte Neergaard-Kofod.
