= Måløv =

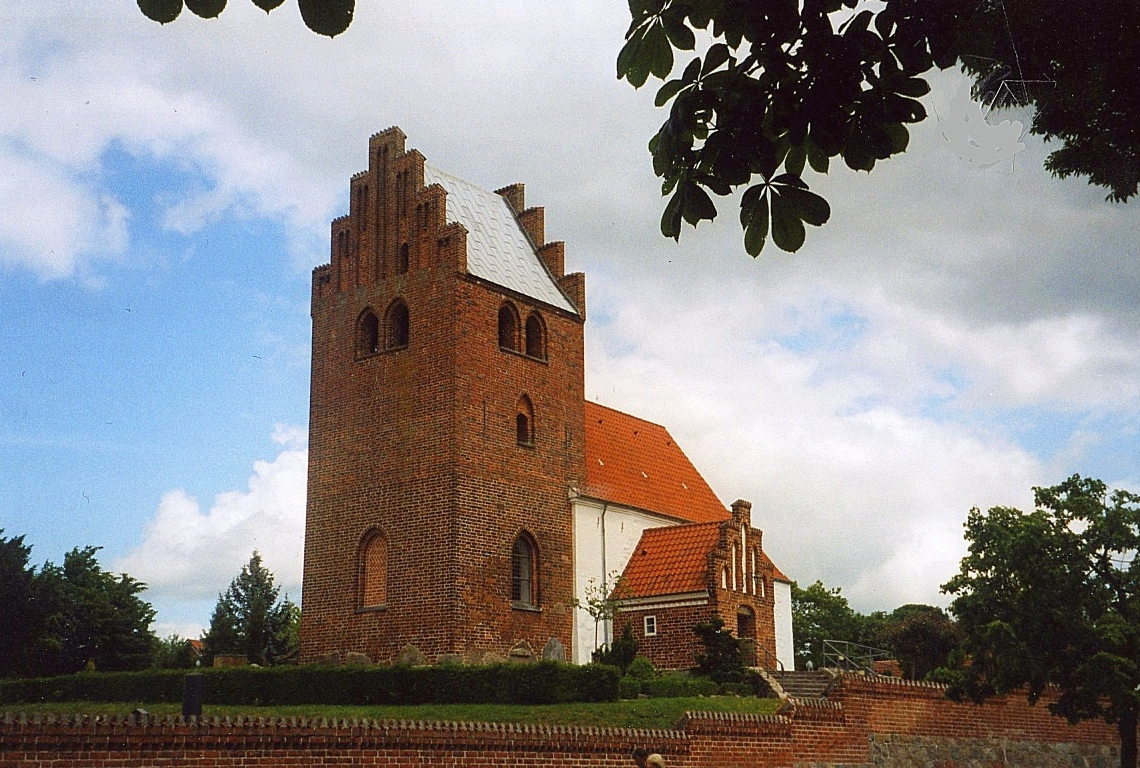
- Måløv Church

- Location in Denmark
- Coordinates: 55°45′N 12°20′E
- Country: Denmark
- Region: Capital Region
- Municipality: Ballerup Municipality

Population (2026)
  - Total: 8,663
- Time zone: UTC+1 (CET)
  - Summer (DST): UTC+2 (CEST)

Måløv is a suburb within Ballerup Municipality, closely attached to Smørumnedre approx. 20 km. west of Copenhagen, in the Capital region, with a population of 8,663 (2026). The suburb is made up of single-family houses and a housing project. The suburb is connected with the S-train and Måløv station serves commuters from both Måløv and Smørumnedre. Måløv is considered to be founded in 1193.

== Green areas ==
Måløv has many green areas and fields around it. So although the city today differs in both scope and character from the time Måløv was a village and a station village, the traces of the bygone times are easy to find. Måløv is thus still a rural town, and as some citizens of Måløv express it: "a lovely city to live in".

== Notable people ==
- Nicoline Sørensen (born 1997 in Måløv) a Danish football player who plays for Everton F.C. (women)
- Edgard Meisler (born 2010 in Måløv) a Danish football player who plays in Arsenal F.C.'s youth teams.
- Jes Dietrich, a Danish author and scientist working with infectious diseases at Statens Serum Institut with a PhD from University of Copenhagen
