= Søsum =

- Town
- Location within Denmark
- Coordinates: 55°46′21″N 12°13′53″E
- Country: Denmark
- Region: Capital Region
- Municipality: Egedal Municipality

Population (2026)
  - Total: 317
- Time zone: UTC+1 (CET)
  - Summer (DST): UTC+2 (CEST)
- Website: www.sosum.dk

Søsum is a small town located in the Egedal Municipality, in the Capital Region of Denmark.
