= Ledøje =

- Town
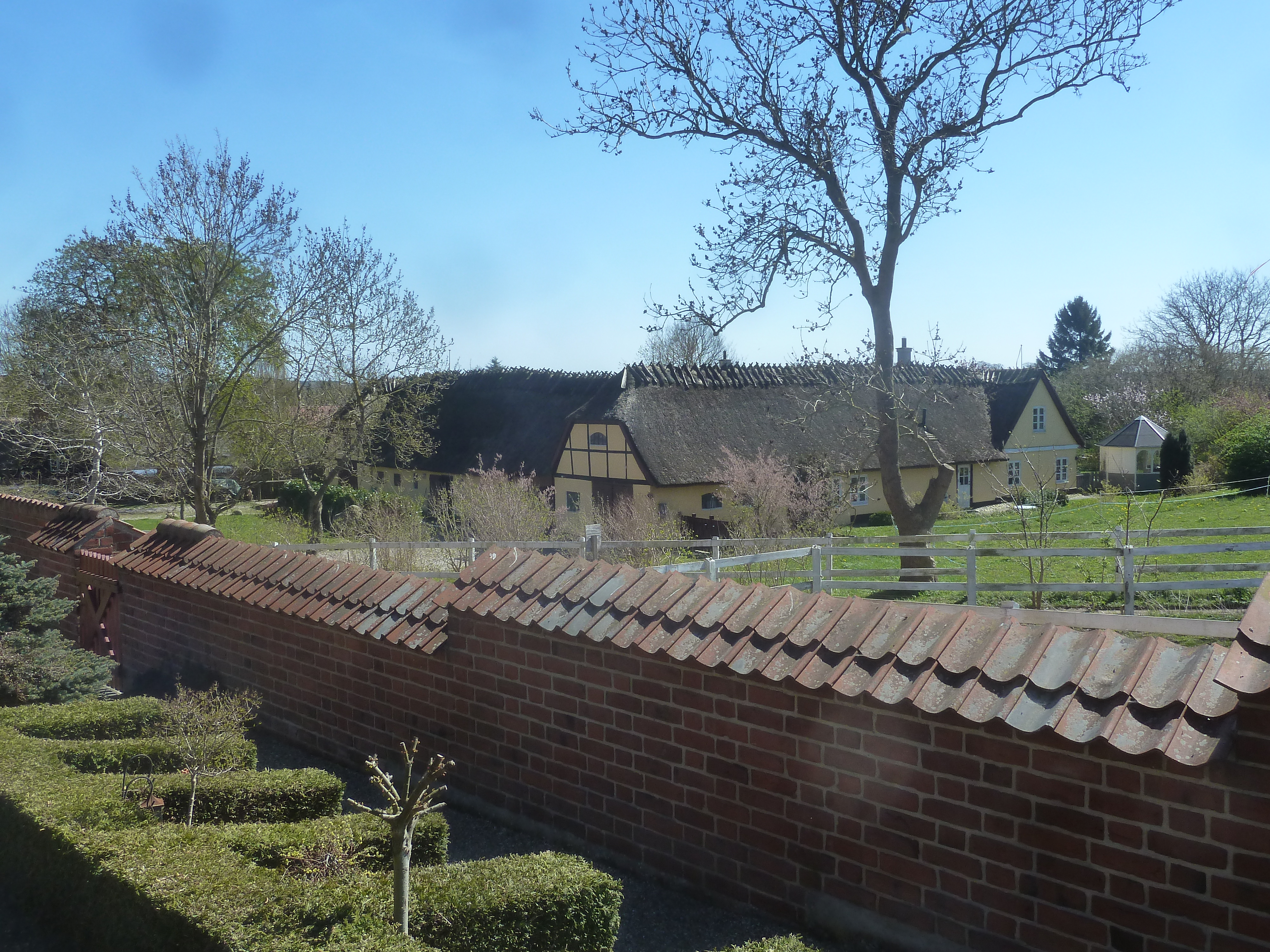
- Ledøje Church

- Location within Denmark
- Coordinates: 55°42′41″N 12°18′4″E
- Country: Denmark
- Region: Capital Region
- Municipality: Egedal Municipality

Population (2026)
  - Total: 815
- Time zone: UTC+1 (CET)
  - Summer (DST): UTC+2 (CEST)

Ledøje is a small town located in the Egedal Municipality, in the Capital Region of Denmark.

== Notable people ==
- Michael Gottlieb Bindesbøll (1800 in Ledøje – 1856) a Danish architect active during the Danish Golden Age
