= Ballerup Municipality =

Ballerup Municipality Ballerup Kommune (Danish)
- Municipality
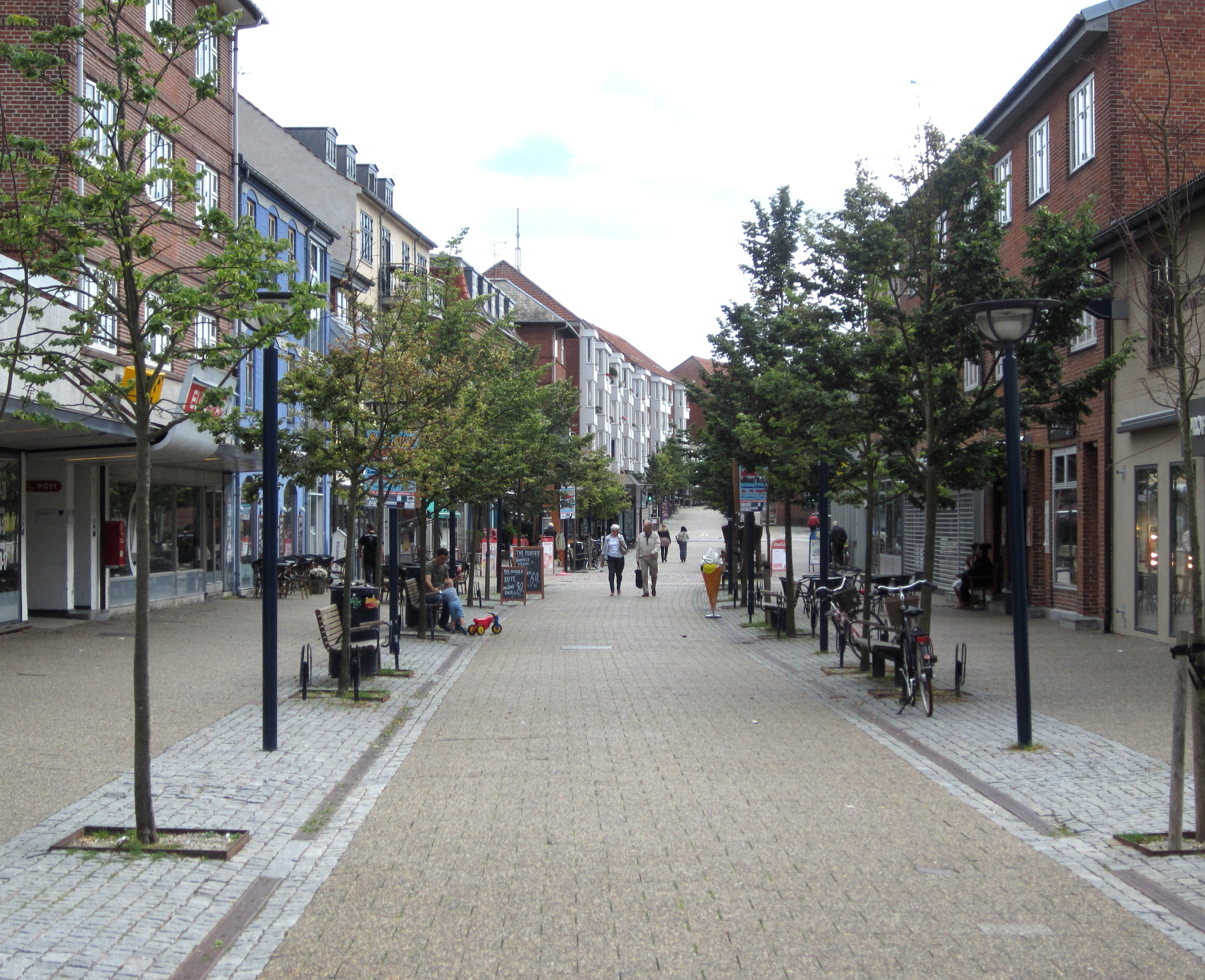

- Coat of arms

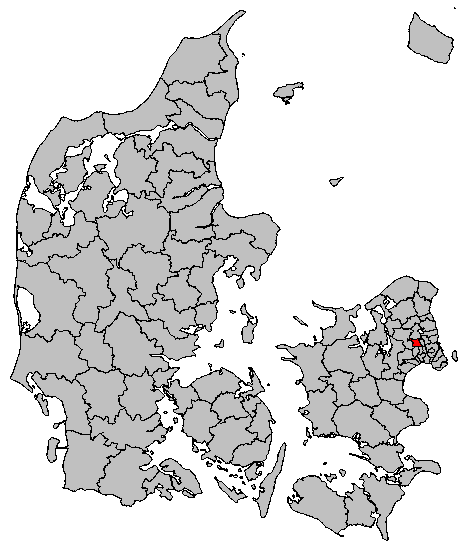
- Coordinates: 55°44′00″N 12°22′00″E
- Country: Denmark
- Region: Hovedstaden
- Established: 1 January 1842
- Seat: Ballerup

Government
  - Mayor: Jesper Würtzen (S)

Area
  - Total: 34.09 km^{2} (13.16 sq mi)

Population (1 January 2026)
  - Total: 53,950
  - Density: 1,583/km^{2} (4,099/sq mi)
- Time zone: UTC+1 (CET)
  - Summer (DST): UTC+2 (CEST)
- Municipal code: 151
- Website: www.ballerup.dk

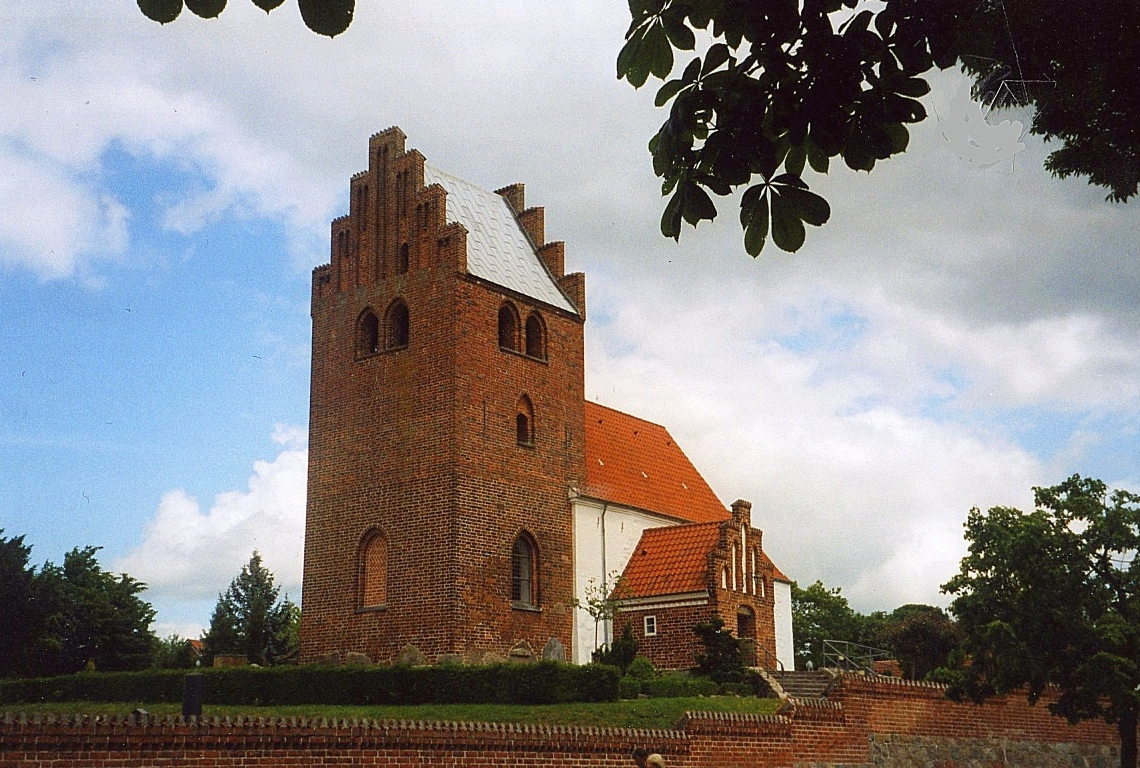
Måløv church

Ballerup Kommune (Danish: [ˈpɛˀləʁop kʰoˈmuːnə]) is a municipality (Danish: kommune) in Region Hovedstaden on the island of Zealand (Sjælland) in eastern Denmark. It is located approximately 15 kilometers from central Copenhagen. The municipality covers an area of 34.09 km^{2}. It is also the name of the municipal seat, Ballerup.

== Overview ==
Other than Ballerup, the towns that make up the municipality are Måløv and Skovlunde.

The municipality has a population of 53,950 as of 1 January 2026, of those are 10,471 between 0-16 years old and 10.503 aged 65 or more.

Neighboring municipalities are Herlev to the east, Furesø and Gladsaxe to the north, Egedal to the west, and Albertslund, Glostrup and Rødovre to the south.

The geography of Ballerup municipality was not affected on 1 January 2007 by the nationwide Kommunalreformen ("The Municipal Reform" of 2007).

== Etymology ==
The name of Ballerup is a combination of the old danish male name Balli and the suffix Torp. Sources show that the name has been used since the 16th century. Since the beginning of the 14th century, there have been known variations of the name such as "Ballitorp", "Ballistorp", "Baldorp", "Balderupæ", "Balrop", "Baltorp", "Baltarup", "Balderup" and "Ballerop".

The word torp means settlement and is also the origin of the suffixes -trup, -drup and -rup, which are common in Danish place names. The resettlements, that are the foundation to many danish city names, happened during the Viking Age and parts of the Middle Ages, roughly in the years from 850 AD to 1350 AD.

Due to population growth, people moved in groups from the older settlements to newer, uncultuivated areas and thus the resettlement towns emerged. They were often named after their founder, which in the case of Ballerup might mean that the new settlement was founded by a man called Ballis.

== Economy ==
The municipality is home to companies such as GN Store Nord, Orbicon and Leo Pharma and Toms International.

== Politics ==
Ballerup's municipal council since the 2025 local elections

As of the 2025 Danish local elections, the mayor is Jesper Würtzen of the Social Democrats who has served as mayor since 2012. Ballerup has been a stronghold for the Social Democrats, who have held the mayoral post since its creation in 1933.

=== Municipal council ===
Ballerup's municipal council consists of 25 members, elected every four years.

Below is the seat distribution for the municipal councils elected since the 1997 Danish local elections.

Election	Party									Total seats	Turnout	Elected mayor
Election	A	B	C	D	F	I	O	V	Ø	Total seats	Turnout	Elected mayor
1997	12		3		2		3	5		25	71.0%	Ove E. Dalsgaard (A)
2001	16		2		2		1	4		25	87.3%	Ove E. Dalsgaard (A)
2005	15	1	2		2		2	3		25	68.5%	Ove E. Dalsgaard (A)
2009	15		2		4		2	2		25	64.1%	Ove E. Dalsgaard (A)
2013	14		1				3	5	2	25	71.0%	Jesper Würtzen (A)
2017	16		1		1		2	3	2	25	70.2%	Jesper Würtzen (A)
2021	13	1	3	1	2		1	1	2	25	65.9%	Jesper Würtzen (A)
2025	10	2	2		3	2	3	1	2	25	65.0%	Jesper Würtzen (A)
Data from valg.dk

== Twin towns – sister cities ==
Ballerup is twinned with:

- Brandenburg an der Havel, Germany
- East Kilbride, Scotland, United Kingdom

Ballerup also cooperates with Ystad in Sweden.

== See also ==
- Ballerup station
- Ballerup Bladet
- Ballerup Super Arena
