= Veksø =

- Town
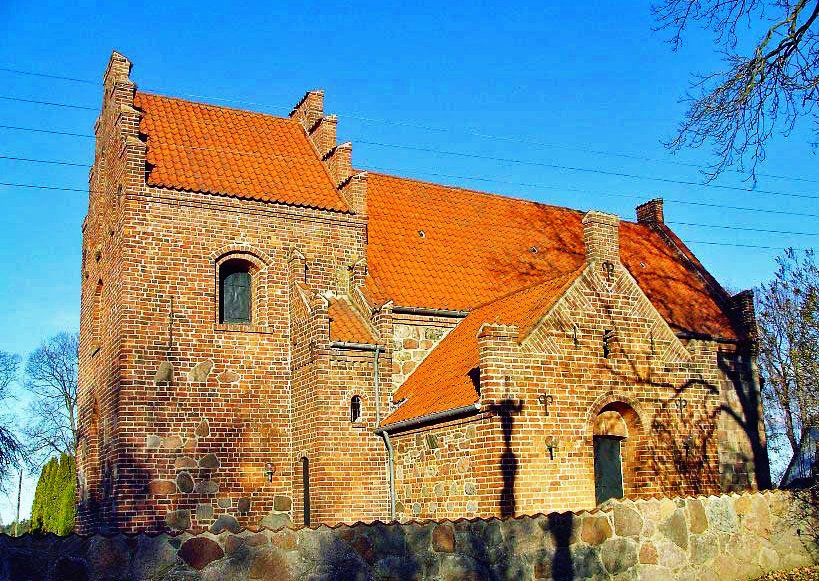

- Location in Denmark
- Coordinates: 55°45′10″N 12°14′20″E
- Country: Denmark
- Region: Capital Region
- Municipality: Egedal

Area
  - Urban: 0.74 km^{2} (0.29 sq mi)

Population (2026)
  - Urban: 1,786
  - Urban density: 2,400/km^{2} (6,300/sq mi)
- Time zone: UTC+1 (CET)
  - Summer (DST): UTC+2 (CEST)
- Postal code: 3670 Veksø Sjælland

Veksø is a small town located between Ballerup and Ølstykke-Stenløse in Egedal, some 20 km northwest of Copenhagen, Denmark. The town is situated on a hill, surrounded by meadows and bogland. Veksø station is served by the Frederikssund radial of the S-train network.

== History ==
The area south of Veksø is the site of a large, shallow-watered lake which was called Vigsø until the 18th century. The name (Veksø) also referred to a castle which may have belonged to Skjalm Hvide of the influential Hvide dynasty. The estate was later owned by Christian I who gave it to Roskilde Cathedral in 1450. After the Reformation, Veksø was confiscated by the crown. The castle had probably been destroyed in the Counts' Feud or may simply have fallen into despair after losing its importance after Copenhagen had been established as Denmark's new capital.

The name Veksø is first recorded in 1370 as Viksyø. In 1568 the village consisted of nine farms. In 1784, it consisted of 15 farms, eight of which moved out of the village. The first school opened in 1730. It was replaced by a new school in 1800.

== Archeological finds ==
A pair of bronze horned helmets, the "Veksø helmets", from the younger Nordic Bronze Age (dating to ca. 900-1100 BC) were found in the Brøns Mose swamp just west of Veksø during peat digging in 1942.

In around 1942, a small bronze statue of a "goddess" (dating to c. 500 BC) was found in a swamp just east of Veksø. The statuette has become known as Venus from Veksø and dates to c. 500 BC, also in the Nordic Bronze Age. In 1978, a similar bronze statuette was found in the stream of Værebro Å. It has become known as The Værebro Woman and also dates to c. 500 BC.

In 2024, additional discoveries were made, referred to as the “Egedal Find,” found in the Værebro Ådal conservation area, a protected region of bogs and freshwater systems. Among the uncovered items were a bronze sword with iron rivets, two small axes, three ankle rings, a fragment of a large pin, and a mysterious, unidentified object. Days after the initial excavation, its founder also located a finely crafted bronze neck ring about 70 meters from the original site.

== See also ==
- Veksø station
