= Ølstykke railway station =

Railway station in Egedal Municipality, Denmark

Ølstykke
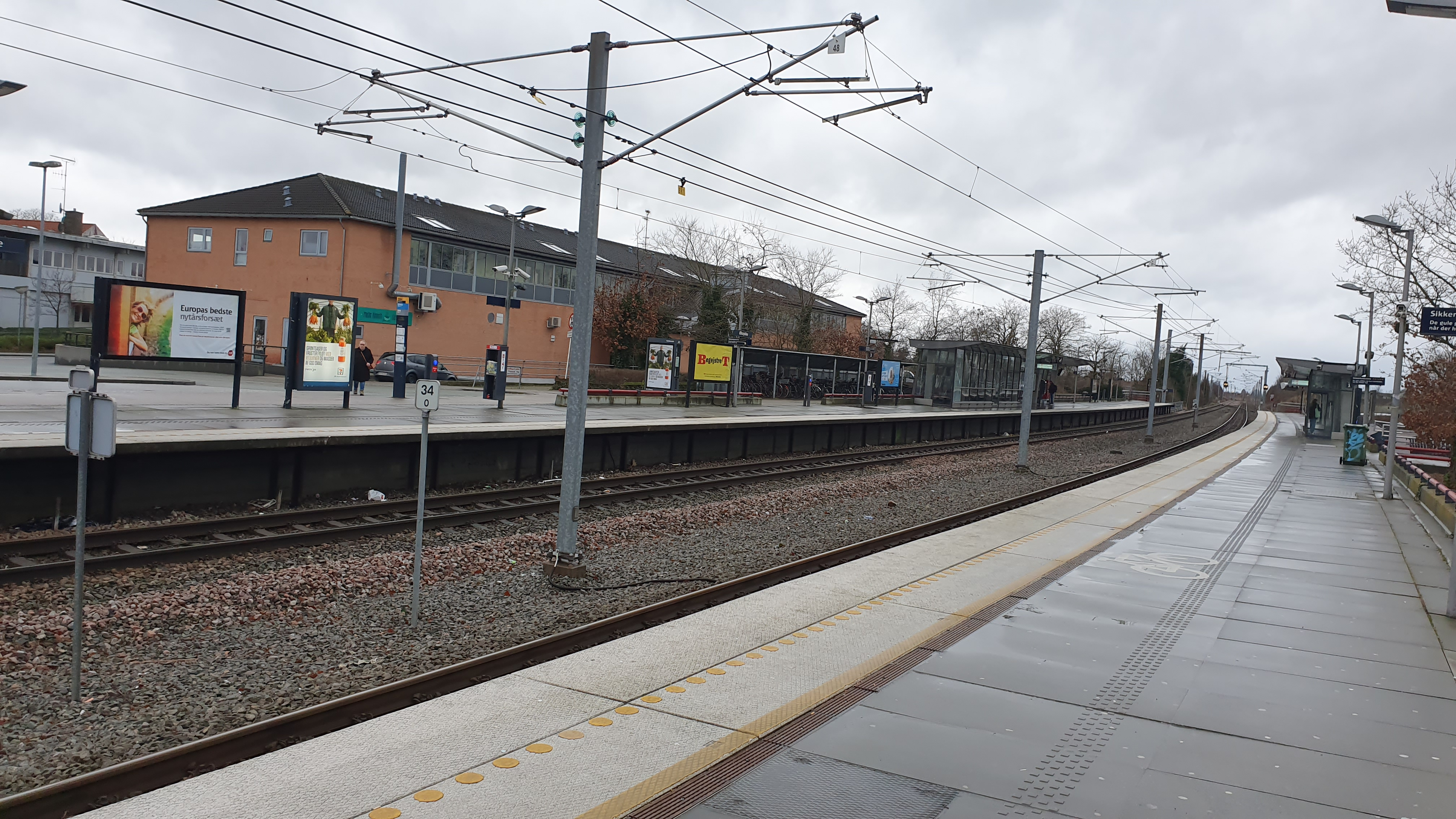
- Ølstykke station in 2020

General information
- Location: Stationsvej 2, 3650 Ølstykke; Egedal Municipality; Denmark
- Coordinates: 55°47′44″N 12°09′36″E
- Elevation: 20.6 metres (68 ft)
- System: S-train station
- Owner: DSB (station infrastructure); Banedanmark (rail infrastructure)
- Platforms: 2 side platforms
- Tracks: 2
- Train operators: DSB
- Bus routes: 312, 600S, 91N

Other information
- Station code: Øl
- Fare zone: 85
- Website: Official website

History
- Opened: 17 June 1879; 147 years ago
- Rebuilt: 28 May 1989 (S-train)
- Electrified: 1989 (S-train)

Services
Preceding station	S-train	Following station
Egedal towards Klampenborg	C	Vinge towards Frederikssund
Egedal towards Klampenborg	C Evening trains	Frederikssund Terminus
Egedal One-way operation	H Special early morning trains Departs from Frederikssund at 04:37, 04:57, 05:17 (Mon–Fri)	Vinge towards Frederikssund
Location

Ølstykke station is an S-train railway station serving the district of Ølstykke Stationsby in the northwestern part of the satellite town of Ølstykke-Stenløse northwest of Copenhagen, Denmark. The station is located on the Frederikssund radial of the S-train network of Greater Copenhagen.

The station is located where the railway to Frederikssund crosses the main road between Roskilde and Hillerød. This puts it quite a distance away from the old village of Ølstykke, but a new station town grew up around the station after the railway opened in 1879. Since 2002, the area around the old village has been served by a station of its own, Gammel Toftegård. Gammel Toftegård station later changed name to Egedal station.

Vinge station 3.3 km (2 miles) northwest of Ølstykke station opened 14 December 2020. It is served by the C line.

== See also ==
- List of Copenhagen S-train stations
- List of railway stations in Denmark
