= Ledøje-Smørum =

Former municipality in Denmark

Coordinates: 55°43′28″N 12°17′08″E

Until 1 January 2007 Ledøje-Smørum was a municipality (Danish, kommune) in Copenhagen County on Zealand (Sjælland) island in eastern Denmark, then merged into Egedal. The municipality covered an area of 31 km^{2} (12 sq mi) and had a total population of 10,525 (2005), northwest of nearby Copenhagen.

== History ==
The last mayor of Ledøje-Smørum was Jens Jørgen Nygaard, a member of the Conservative People's Party (Det Konservative Folkeparti) political party. The main town and the site of its municipal council was the town of Smørum.

The municipality had been created in 1970 as the result of a kommunalreform ("Municipality Reform") that merged a number of existing parishes:

- Ledøje Parish
- Smørum Parish.

Ledøje-Smørum municipality ceased to exist as the result of Kommunalreformen ("The Municipality Reform" of 2007). It was merged with Stenløse and Ølstykke municipalities to form the new Egedal municipality. This created a municipality with an area of 126 km^{2} (49 sq mi) and a total population of 39,267 (2005). The new municipality belongs to Region Hovedstaden ("Capital Region").
