= Ølstykke-Stenløse =

- City
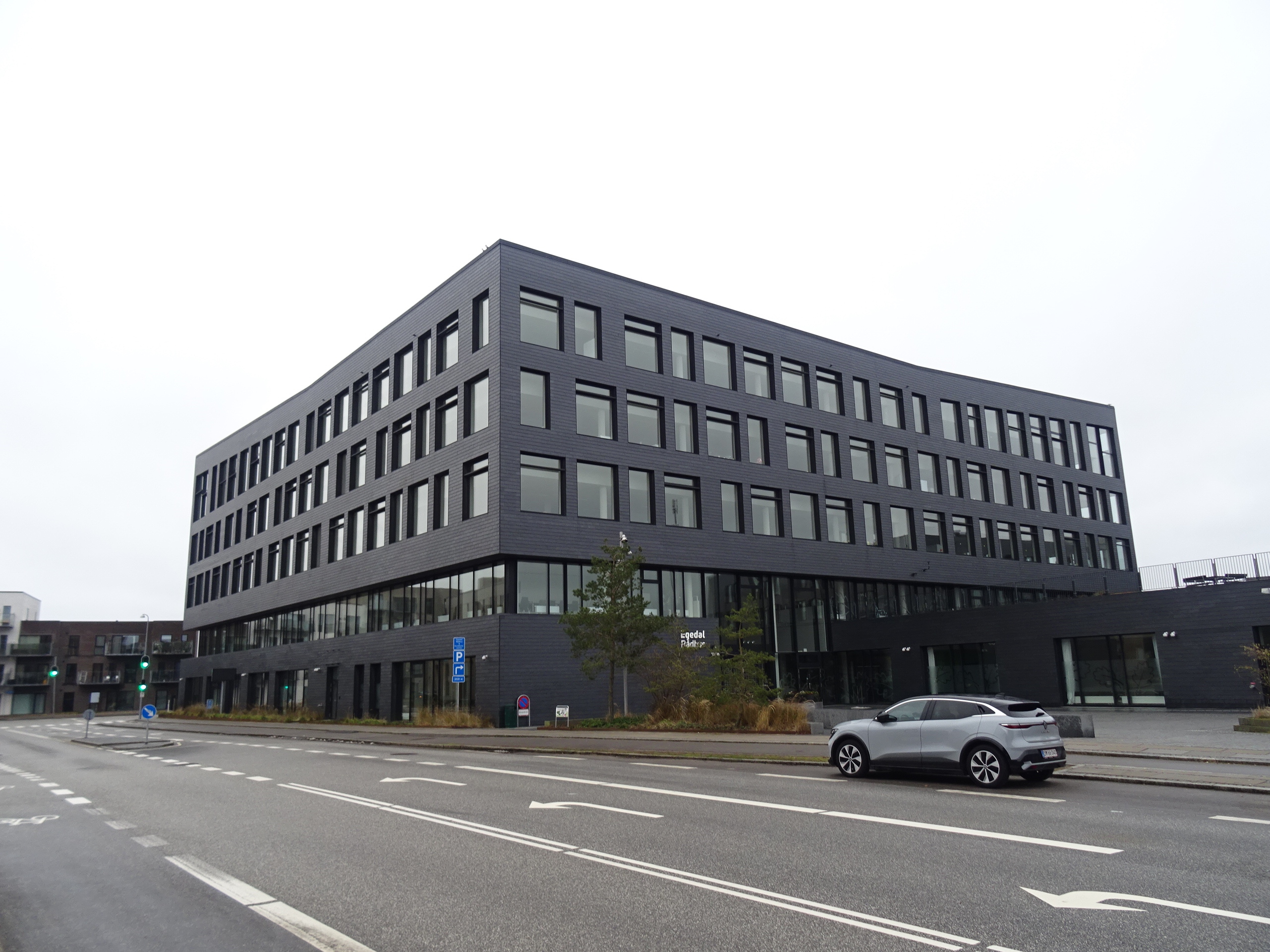
- Egedal Municipal center

- Location within Denmark Location within Capital Region
- Coordinates: 55.77941°N 12.18638°E
- Country: Denmark
- Region: Capital Region
- Municipality: Egedal Municipality
- Established: 1 January 2010

Area
  - Urban: 10.1 km^{2} (3.9 sq mi)

Population (1 January 2026)
  - Urban: 23,904
  - Urban density: 2,370/km^{2} (6,130/sq mi)
  - Gender: 11,766 males and 12,138 females
- Time zone: UTC+1 (CET)
  - Summer (DST): UTC+2 (CEST)

Ølstykke-Stenløse is a city located in the Egedal Municipality, in the Capital Region of Denmark. Both Ølstykke and Stenløse has been counted as one city by Statistics Denmark from 1 January 2010, and it forms the eastern part of the city closest to Copenhagen, 25 kilometers in a straight line northwest of City Hall Square, as well as Gammel Ølstykke and Ølstykke Stationsby in the west. It is Denmark's 28th largest city (2026), with a population of 23,904 (2026). It is the largest city in Egedal Municipality and more than half of the municipality's residents live within the city.

Both Ølstykke and Stenløse had been established as villages with parish churches in the Middle Ages. Their settlements remained relatively rural until the mid 20th century, when suburban developments expanded their populations dramatically.

== History ==
=== Middle Ages ===
Written records of Stenløse go back to the 13th century. The first known mention of the village was made in 1260, when it was recorded as Stenløsæ macla. Records of Ølstykke date back to 1335, when the village was mentioned as Ølstikkæ. Its name is believed to come from the now antiquated name Ø̄lēf and the old Danish work tykke, meaning "dense vegetation".

Both settlements remained small from the Middle Ages through the Early modern period, and did not see significant population growth until the 20th century.

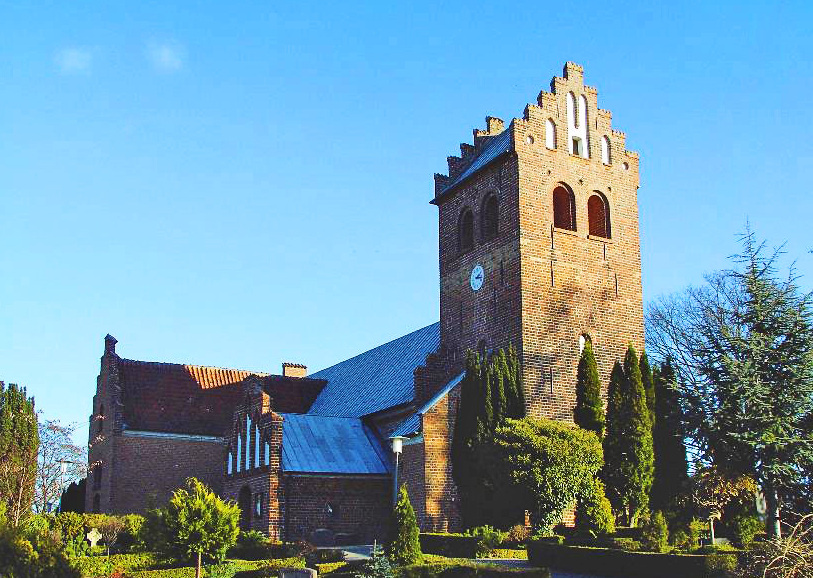
Stenløse kirke, constructed c. 1100.

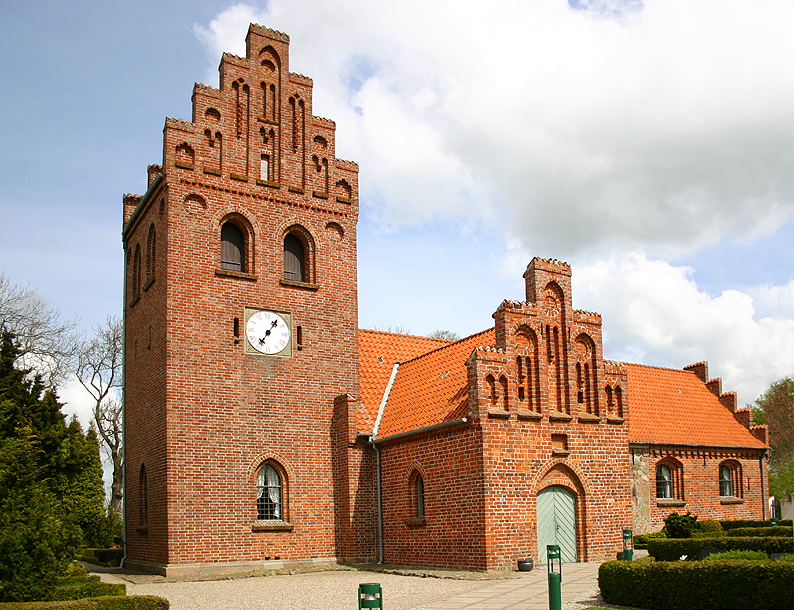
Ølstykke kirke, constructed c. 1100.

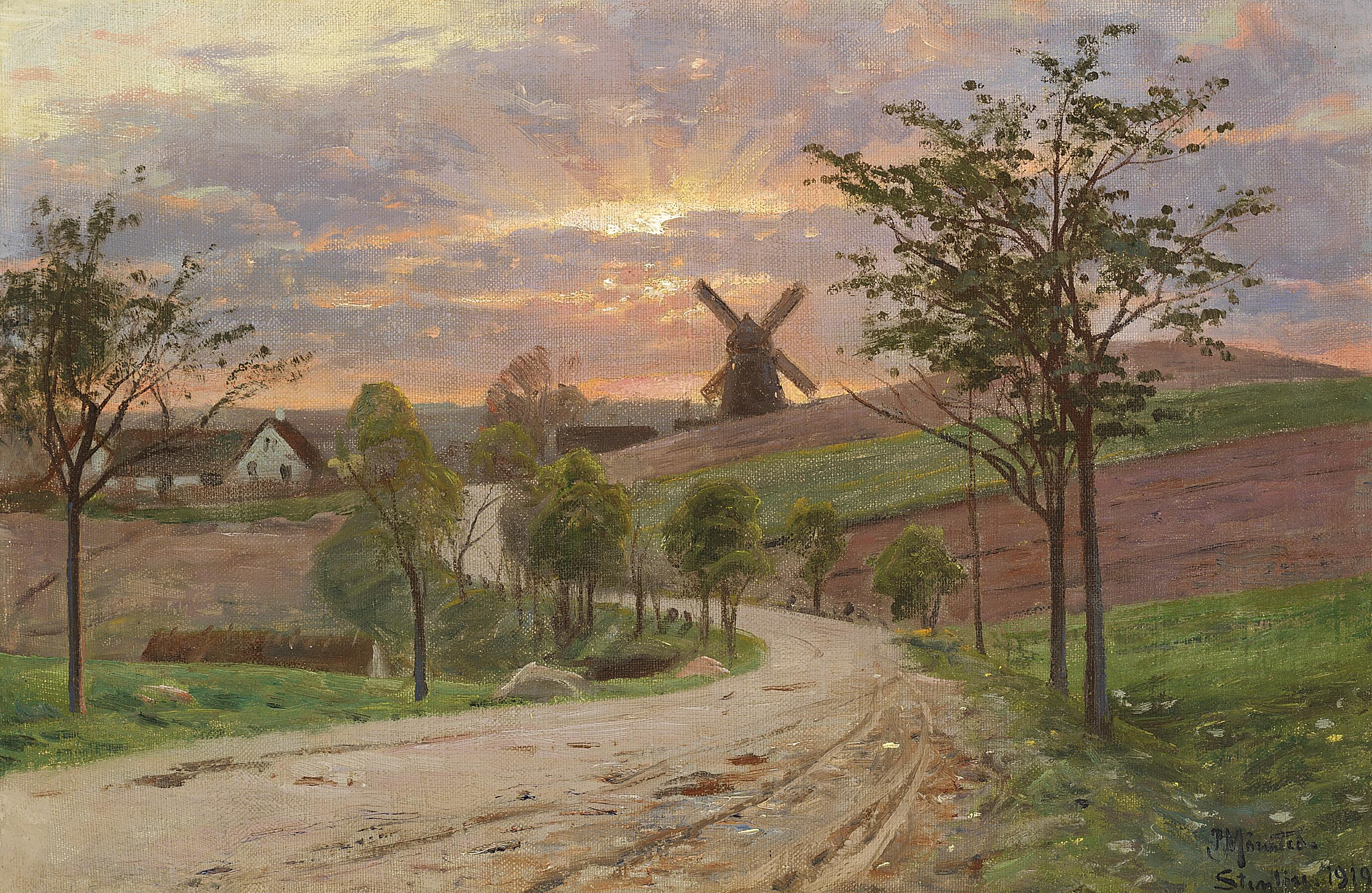
En landevej ved Stenløse med en mølle i baggrunden, solnedgang (English: A road at Stenløse near a mill. Sunset.). Peder Mørk Mønsted, 1919.

=== Suburban development ===
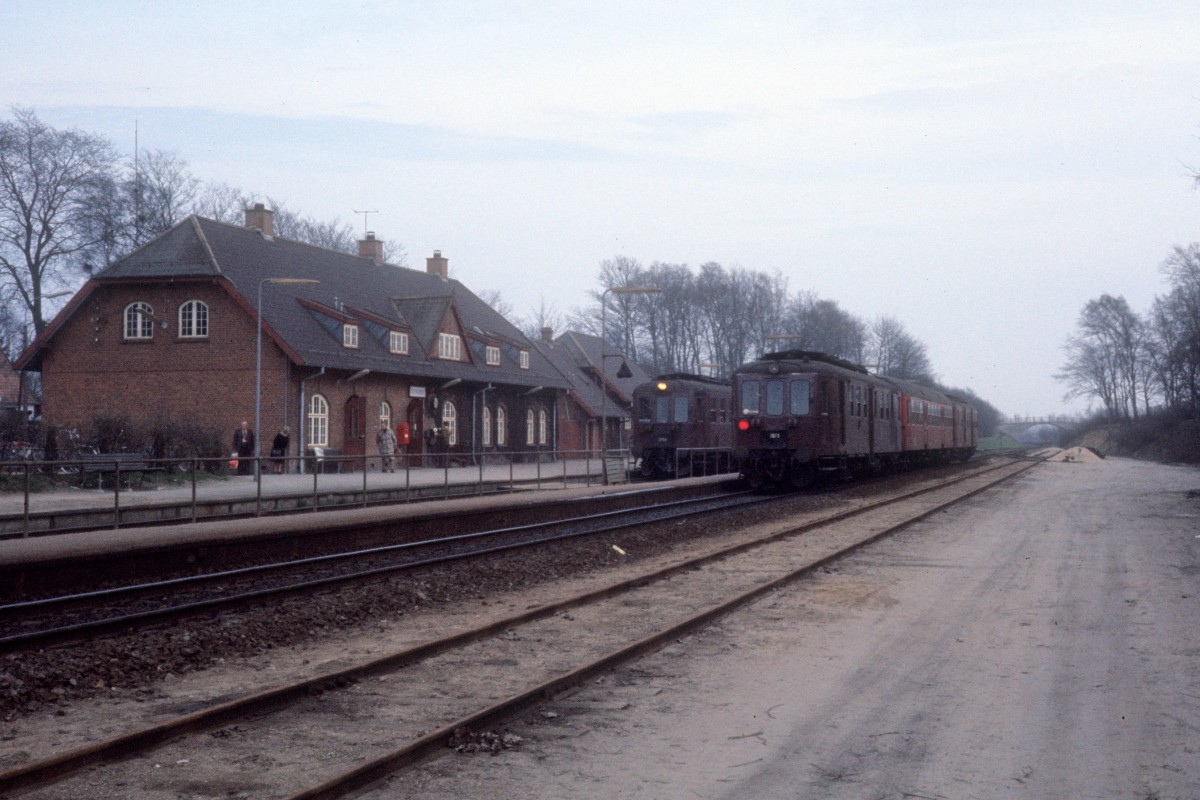
DSB service stopping at Stenløse station, 1979.

In 1879 the Frederikssundbanen was extended through the area, which created easy access in the region to Copenhagen and spurred its development as a suburb. Initially, only one station was planned near Ølstykke-Stenløse, Ølstykke station. A temporary station building opened in Stenløse in 1895 before a permanent station was designed by Heinrich Wenck.

After WWII, development of the region began en masse. Arbejderbo, which was later renamed Stenløsebo, was constructed as a social housing estate near Stenløse station. Several government loan houses were built through the 1950s and the 1960s saw the construction of detached home developments. In Ølstykke near the rail station, the former lands of the Ørnebjerg, Karmsten, and Vejsten were purchased by a construction consortium beginning in 1958. Around 1960, the estates of Gammel Toftegård, Stengård, Stendalsgård, and Kildehom surrounding the old village of Ølstykke were purchased by consortium for residential development. Egedal Center (then Stenløse Center) was constructed in 1967 and completed with a town hall in 1974. This period saw the number of residents in Stenløse grow from 314 in 1921 to 4,263 in 1970, and in Ølstykke from just over 300 in 1965 to 1,111 in 1970. By 1977, Ølstykke's population had balloned to over 12,000 residents.

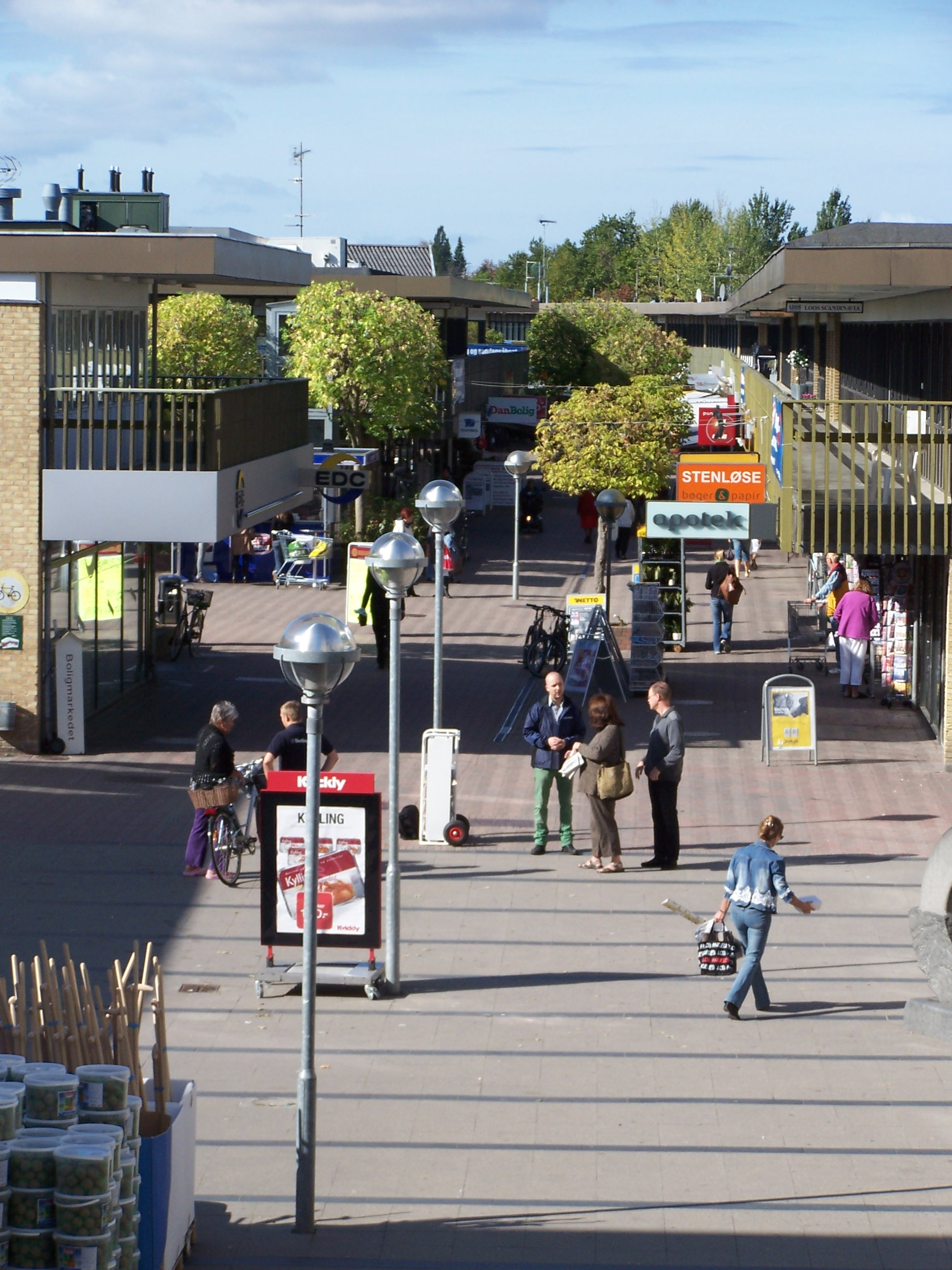
Egedal Center, 2009.

Through the 1970s the area continued to expand with the construction of detached homes, roads and cycle infrastructure, and pedestrian paths. Several new schools were established to accommodate the growing population. Svanhom School (Danish: Svanholmskolen) had been established in 1937 and already expanded in 1958, but could not keep up with the growing number of students. Stengårdsskolen was established in 1971, followed by Præstegårdsskolen (now Lærkeskolen) in 1972, Hempelandskolen in 1975, and Bækkegårdsskolen in 2003. Ølstykke-Stenløse Amtsgymnasium (now Egedal Gymnasium & HF) began teaching high school students in 1979 out of temporary buildings until a purpose-built structure was completed in 1981.

Since 2000, there has been a second surge in projects, with the development of thousands of new homes and a purpose built municipal center near Egedal Station.

== Transportation ==
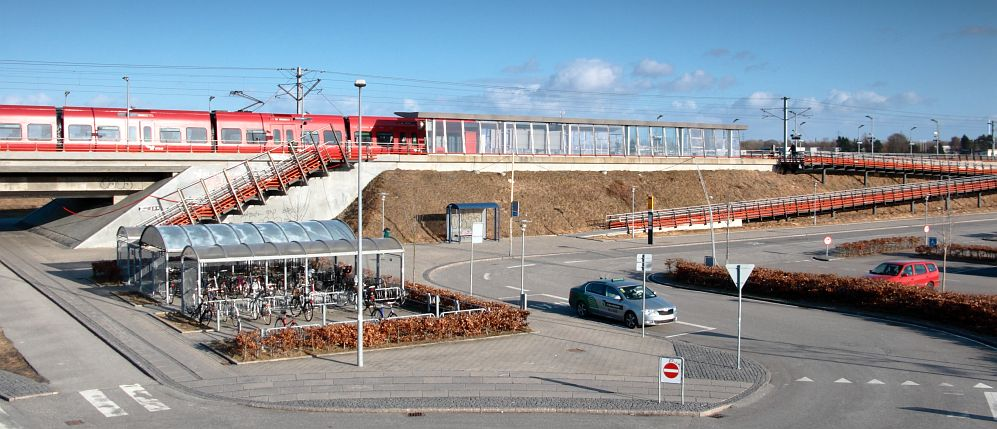
Egedal station, opened in 2002 as Gammel Toftegård station.

Since 1989, the city has been connected to Copenhagen's S-train via the Frederikssundbanen on C and H services. Trains make stops at three railway stations within the city: Ølstykke station, Egedal station, and Stenløse station. These stations are about a 30–40 minute journey to Copenhagen's city center.

Ølstykke-Stenløse is connected to Danish national road 6 and to Zealand's motorway system via the Frederikssundmotorvejen. Bus lines offer direct connections from Ølstykke-Stenløse to Holte, Farum, Birkerød, Hillerød, Hundige, Frederikssund, and Roskilde.

== Geography ==
Ølstykke-Stenløse has close access to several natural landscapes. 10 km to the south-west lies Nationalpark Skjoldungernes Land, the only national part on Zealand, which provides access to Roskilde Fjord. The north, east, and south of the city are surrounded by a moraine landscape formed during an ice age, which is dotted by lakes and marshes created by pockets of melting ice. Egedal municipality's nature strategy places particular emphasis on maintaining the marsh and meadow areas which surround Ølstykke-Stenløse and its other towns. There is a limited extent of forest cover around the city, with small patches of forest east of Ølstykke Stationsby, and near Stenløse BK's stadium.

== Notable people ==
- Lars Hendriksen (born 1966 in Ølstykke) a Danish sailor, competed at the 1992 Summer Olympics
- Tine Scheuer-Larsen (born 1966 in Ølstykke) a retired female tennis player
- Mark Gundelach (born 1992 in Stenløse) a Danish football midfielder, who plays for FC Roskilde
- Nicklas Strunck (born 1999 in Stenløse) a Danish footballer who plays for Bryne FK
