= Egedal Municipality =

Egedal Municipality Egedal Kommune (Danish)
- Municipality
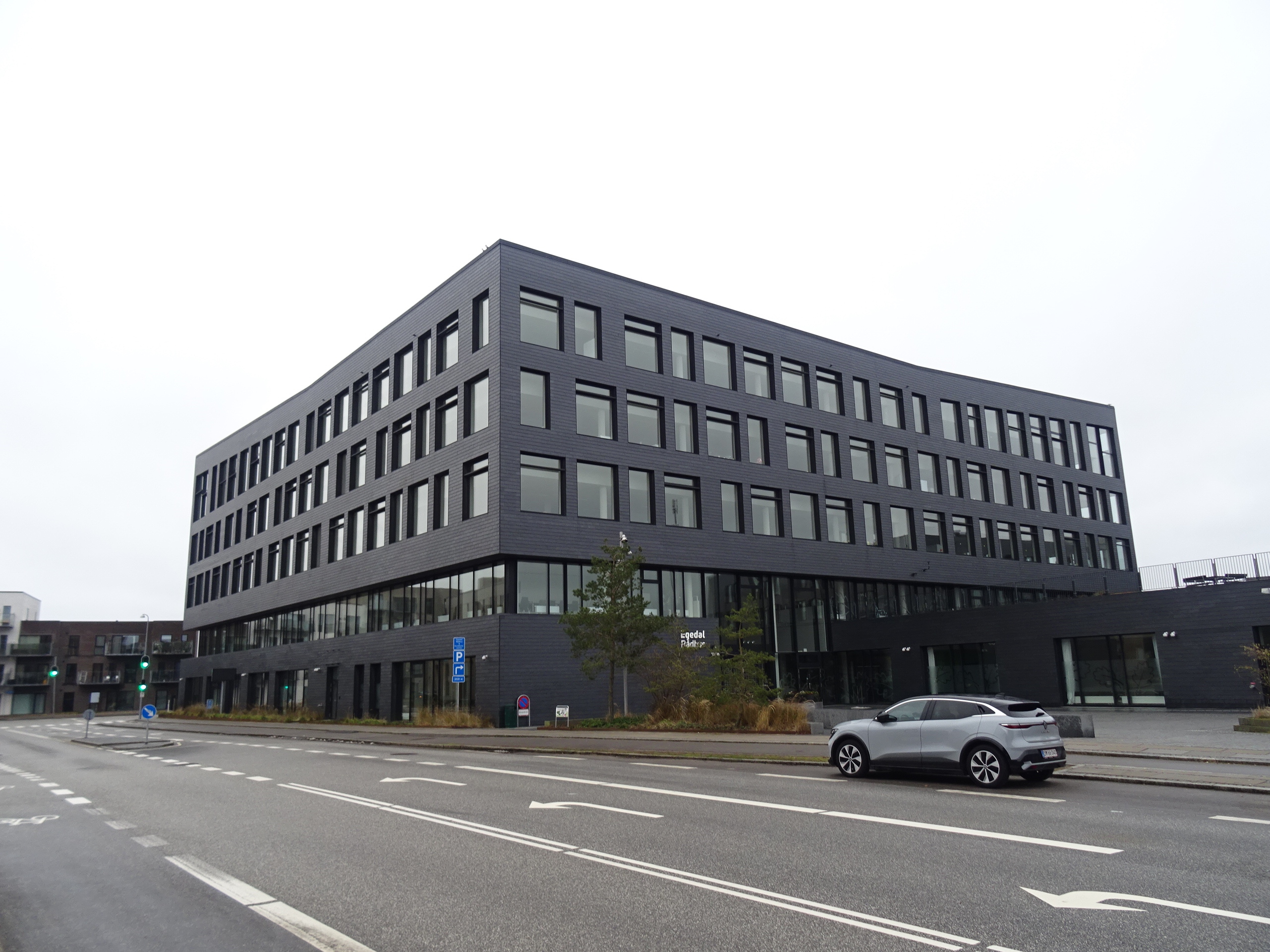
- City hall

- Coat of arms

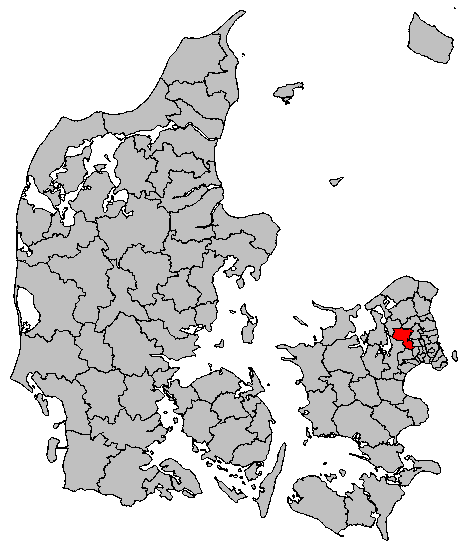
- Coordinates: 55°46′07″N 12°12′46″E
- Country: Denmark
- Region: Hovedstaden
- Established: 1 January 2007
- Seat: Ølstykke

Government
  - Mayor: Birgitte Neergaard-Kofod (C)

Area
  - Total: 125.79 km^{2} (48.57 sq mi)

Population (1 January 2026)
  - Total: 46,240
  - Density: 367.6/km^{2} (952.1/sq mi)
- Time zone: UTC+1 (CET)
  - Summer (DST): UTC+2 (CEST)
- Municipal code: 240
- Website: www.egedalkommune.dk

Egedal Municipality (Danish: Egedal Kommune) is a municipality (Danish, kommune) in Region Hovedstaden in Denmark. It covers an area of 125.79 km^{2} (48.57 sq mi) with a total population of 46,240 (1 January 2026).

== History ==
On 1 January 2007 Egedal municipality was created as the result of Kommunalreformen ("The Municipal Reform" of 2007), consisting of the former municipalities of Ledøje-Smørum (Copenhagen County), Ølstykke (Frederiksborg County), and Stenløse (Frederiksborg County).

== Settlements ==
Ølstykke-Stenløse	22,003
Smørumnedre	9,949
Ganløse	2,884
Veksø	1,799
Slagslunde	903
Ledøje	773
Laanshøj	597
Tangbjerg	597
Buresø	496
Søsum	312

== Politics ==
=== Municipal council ===
Egedal's municipal council consists of 21 members, elected every four years.

Below are the municipal councils elected since the Municipal Reform of 2007.

Election	Party								Total seats	Turnout	Elected mayor
Election	A	B	C	E	F	I	O	V	Total seats	Turnout	Elected mayor
2005	5	1	8		2		1	10	27	77.1%	Svend Kjærgaard (V)
2009	4	1	6	1	3		1	5	21	73.7%	Willy Eliasen (V)
2013	5	2	4		1	1	2	6	21	77.3%	Willy Eliasen (V)
2017	6	3	2		1	1	2	6	21	75.8%	Karsten Søndergaard (V)
Data from Kmdvalg.dk 2005, 2009, 2013 and 2017
