= List of churches in Frederikssund Municipality =

This list of churches in Frederikssund Municipality lists church buildings in Frederikssund Municipality, Denmark.

== List ==
Name	Location	Year	Coordinates	Image	Refs
Draaby Church	Draaby	c. 1150	55°50′26.88″N 11°59′19.31″E		
Ferslev Church	Ferslev	c. 1100	55°45′39.23″N 11°54′49.68″E		
Frederikssund Church	Frederikssund	c. 1200	55°50′18.95″N 12°4′9.48″E		
Gerlev Church	Gerlev	12th century	55°49′13.9″N 12°0′49.9″E		
Græse Church	Græse	c. 1100	55°51′39.96″N 12°5′58.56″E		
Islebjerg Church	Islebjerg	1898	55°50′48.83″N 12°3′36.72″E		
Jørlunde Church	Jørlunde	c. 1100	55°49′49.5″N 12°10′10″E		
Krogstrup Church	Krogstrup	c. 1125	55°47′0.24″N 11°57′56.52″E		
Kyndby Church	Kyndby	c. 1125	55°47′39.84″N 11°54′54.36″E		
Oppe Sundby Church	Oppe Sundby	c. 1100	55°49′15.37″N 12°6′1.94″E		
Selsø Church	Selsø	c. 1150	55°44′47″N 12°0′22.2″E		
Sigerslevvester Church		c. 1100	55°52′40.43″N 12°5′30.84″E		
Skibby Church	Skibby	c. 1100	55°44′54.4″N 11°57′30″E		
Skoven Church		1897	55°44′15.47″N 11°56′31.91″E		
Skuldelev Church	Skuldelev	1150	55°47′5.6″N 12°1′3″E		
Slangerup Church	Slangerup	1588	55°50′44.74″N 12°10′14.88″E		
Snostrup Church	Snostrup	c. 1100	55°48′18.36″N 12°7′38.63″E		
Vellerup Church	Vellerup	c. 1100	55°44′35.87″N 11°52′38.99″E		

== See also ==
- Listed buildings in Gribskov Municipality
- List of churches in Helsingør Municipality
- List of churches in Hillerød Municipality
- List of churches in Egedal Municipality
