= Listed buildings in Frederikssund Municipality =

This is a list of listed buildings in Frederikssund Municipality, Denmark.

== List ==
=== 3600 Frederikssund ===
Listing name	Image	Location	Coordinates	Description
Oppe Sundby Old School		Roskildevej 181, 3600 Frederikssund		School building from 1807 with western extension from c. 1850 and northern extension from 1912.

=== 3630 Jægerspris ===
Listing name	Image	Location	Coordinatest	Description
Fasangården		Fasangårdsvej 1, 3630 Jægerspris	1838	
Jægerspris Færgegård		Færgelundsvej 1, 3630 Jægerspris	1838	
Jægerspris Færgegård		Færgelundsvej 1, 3630 Jægerspris	1838	
Jægerspris Færgegård		Færgelundsvej 1, 3630 Jægerspris	1838	
Jægerspris Castle		Slotsgården 18, 3630 Jægerspris		
Jægerspris Castle		Slotsgården 18, 3630 Jægerspris		
Jægerspris Castle		Slotsgården 18, 3630 Jægerspris		
Jægerspris Castle		Slotsgården 18, 3630 Jægerspris		
Jægerspris Castle: Memorials		Slotsgården 18, 3630 Jægerspris		Memorials by Johannes Wiedewelt from 1777-89 in Jægerspris Castle Park
Jægerspris Castle: Memorials		Dyrnæsvej 0, 3630 Jægerspris		Memorials by Johannes Wiedewelt from 1777-89 in Jægerspris Slotshegn
Swiss House		Færgelundsvej 3, 3630 Jægerspris		

=== 4050 Skibby ===
Listing name	Image	Location	Coordinates	Description
Selsø		Selsøvej 30, 4050 Skibby		
Selsø		Selsøvej 30A, 4050 Skibby		
Selsø		Selsøvej 30B, 4050 Skibby		
Skuldelev Old Rectory		Østergade 3, 4050 Skibby		Redidential north wing
Skuldelev Old Rectory		Østergade 3, 4050 Skibby		West wing
Skuldelev Old Rectory		Østergade 3, 4050 Skibby		South wing
Skuldelev Old Rectory		Østergade 3, 4050 Skibby		
Svanholm		Svanholm Alle 2, 4050 Skibby	1744	

== See also ==
- List of churches in Frederikssund Municipality
