= 2021 Frederikssund municipal election =

← 2017	16 November 2021	2025 →

All 23 seats to the Frederikssund Municipal Council 12 seats needed for a majority
- Turnout: 25,475 (69.2%) ▼3.4pp
	First party	Second party	Third party
	A	V	C
Party	Social Democrats	Venstre	Conservatives
Last election	8 seats, 34.9%	9 seats, 32,4%	1 seat, 5.5%
Seats won	7	7	2
Seat change	▼1	▼2	▲1
Popular vote	7,356	6,152	2,281
Percentage	29.5%	24.7%	9.2%
Swing	▼5.4%	▼7.7%	▲3.7%
	Fourth party	Fifth party	Sixth party
	F	N	O
Party	Green Left	Fjordlandslisten	Danish People's Party
Last election	1 seat, 3.4%	Did Not Stand	2 seats, 10.5%
Seats won	2	1	1
Seat change	▲1	▲1	▼1
Popular vote	1,884	1,951	1,732
Percentage	7.6%	7.8%	7.0%
Swing	▲4.2%	New	▼3.5%
	Seventh party	Eighth party	Ninth party
	D	Ø	B
Party	New Right	Red–Green Alliance	Social Liberals
Last election	0 seats, 1.1%	1 seat, 3.9%	1 seat, 2.8%
Seats won	1	1	1
Seat change	▲1	0	0
Popular vote	1,249	1,182	845
Percentage	5.0%	4.7%	3.4%
Swing	▲3.9%	▲0.8%	▲0.6%
Mayor before election
John Schmidt Andersen
Venstre
Mayor after election
Tina Tving Stauning
Social Democrats

Following the 2017 election, John Schmidt Andersen from Venstre had won a second term as mayor of Frederikssund Municipality

In this election, Venstre would end up winning 7 seats, 2 less than in 2017. Local party Fjordlandslisten would also win a seat, and could possibly become the deciding mandate, as both the traditional blocs had won 11 seats. In the end they opted for supporting Tina Tving Stauning from the Social Democrats to take over the mayor's position. With the Social Liberals, the Green Left and the Red–Green Alliance also supporting her, she would become the new mayor.

== Electoral system ==
For elections to Danish municipalities, a number varying from 9 to 31 are chosen to be elected to the municipal council. The seats are then allocated using the D'Hondt method and a closed list proportional representation. Frederikssund Municipality had 23 seats in 2021

Unlike in Danish General Elections, in elections to municipal councils, electoral alliances are allowed.

== Electoral alliances ==
=== Electoral Alliance 1 ===
Party		Political alignment
A	Social Democrats	Centre-left
P	Anja Bisp Pedersen	Local politics

=== Electoral Alliance 2 ===
Party		Political alignment
F	Green Left	Centre-left to Left-wing
Ø	Red–Green Alliance	Left-wing to Far-Left

=== Electoral Alliance 3 ===
Party		Political alignment
B	Social Liberals	Centre to Centre-left
C	Conservatives	Centre-right

=== Electoral Alliance 4 ===
Party		Political alignment
D	New Right	Right-wing to Far-right
O	Danish People's Party	Right-wing to Far-right
V	Venstre	Centre-right

== Results by polling station ==
H = Forenet Frederikssund
N = Fjordlandslisten
P = Anja Bisp Pedersen

Division	A	B	C	D	F	H	N	O	P	V	Ø
Division	%	%	%	%	%	%	%	%	%	%	%
Frederikssund Midt	32.9	3.5	8.5	4.4	8.5	0.4	6.6	6.1	0.5	24.4	4.2
Frederikssund Nord	30.6	4.3	9.9	5.1	8.4	0.5	7.3	6.7	0.4	22.5	4.3
Frederikssund Syd	28.3	5.2	9.4	4.5	9.2	0.4	6.5	6.0	0.3	26.7	3.5
Skibby	27.4	2.0	9.1	5.4	6.8	0.2	11.9	7.4	0.6	23.0	6.3
Slangerup	27.5	3.4	11.5	5.5	6.1	0.3	2.8	8.0	0.1	31.9	2.9
Jægerspris	30.4	2.5	6.9	5.1	6.7	0.2	11.1	7.3	3.0	19.8	6.9

== Results ==
Party		Votes	%	+/-	Seats	+/-
Frederikssund Municipality
A	Social Democrats	7,356	29.51	-5.36	7	-1
V	Venstre	6,152	24.68	-7.71	7	-2
C	Conservatives	2,281	9.15	+3.69	2	+1
N	Fjordlandslisten	1,951	7.83	New	1	New
F	Green Left	1,884	7.56	+4.21	2	+1
O	Danish People's Party	1,732	6.95	-3.59	1	-1
D	New Right	1,249	5.01	+3.87	1	+1
Ø	Red-Green Alliance	1,182	4.74	+0.82	1	0
B	Social Liberals	845	3.39	+0.57	1	0
P	Anja Bisp Pedersen	215	0.86	New	0	New
H	Forenet Frederikssund	80	0.32	New	0	New
Total		24,927	100	N/A	23	N/A
Invalid votes		147	0.40	+0.19		
Blank votes		401	1.09	+0.25		
Turnout		25,475	69.22	-3.33		
Source: valg.dk
