= 2025 Frederikssund municipal election =

Municipal election in Denmark

| ← 2021 | 18 November 2025 | 2029 → |

All 23 seats to the Frederikssund municipal council 12 seats needed for a majority
- Turnout: 27,341 (71.0%) ▲1.8%
| | First party | Second party | Third party |
|---|---|---|---|
| | A | V | I |
| Party | Social Democrats | Venstre | Liberal Alliance |
| Last election | 7 seats, 29.5% | 7 seats, 24.7% | Did not stand |
| Seats won | 5 | 5 | 4 |
| Seat change | ▼2 | ▼2 | ▲4 |
| Popular vote | 5,228 | 5,212 | 4,743 |
| Percentage | 19.5% | 19.5% | 17.7% |
| Swing | ▼10.0% | ▼5.2% | New |
| | Fourth party | Fifth party | Sixth party |
| | F | O | C |
| Party | Green Left | Danish People's Party | Conservatives |
| Last election | 2 seats, 7.6% | 1 seat, 6.9% | 2 seats, 9.2% |
| Seats won | 3 | 3 | 2 |
| Seat change | ▲1 | ▲2 | 0 |
| Popular vote | 3,374 | 2,934 | 2,149 |
| Percentage | 12.6% | 11.0% | 8.0% |
| Swing | ▲5.0% | ▲4.0% | ▼1.1% |
| | Seventh party | Eighth party |
| | Ø | B |
| Party | Red-Green Alliance | Social Liberals |
| Last election | 1 seat, 4.7% | 1 seat, 3.4% |
| Seats won | 1 | 0 |
| Seat change | 0 | ▼1 |
| Popular vote | 989 | 818 |
| Percentage | 3.7% | 3.1% |
| Swing | ▼1.0% | ▼0.3% |
Mayor before election
Tina Tving Stauning
Social Democrats
Mayor after election
Anne Sofie Uhrskov
Venstre

The 2025 Frederikssund Municipal election was held on November 18, 2025, to elect the 23 members to sit in the regional council for the Frederikssund Municipal council, in the period of 2026 to 2029. Anne Sofie Uhrskov from Venstre, would win the mayoral position.

== Background ==
Following the 2021 election, Tina Tving Stauning from Social Democrats became mayor for her first term. She would run for another term.

== Electoral system ==
For elections to Danish municipalities, a number varying from 9 to 31 are chosen to be elected to the municipal council. The seats are then allocated using the D'Hondt method and a closed list proportional representation. Frederikssund Municipality had 23 seats in 2025.

== Electoral alliances ==
=== Electoral Alliance 1 ===
| Party | | Political alignment |
|---|---|---|
| A | Social Democrats | Centre-left |
| F | Green Left | Centre-left to Left-wing |
| Ø | Red-Green Alliance | Left-wing to Far-Left |
| Å | The Alternative | Centre-left to Left-wing |

=== Electoral Alliance 2 ===
| Party | | Political alignment |
|---|---|---|
| B | Social Liberals | Centre to Centre-left |
| M | Moderates | Centre to Centre-right |

=== Electoral Alliance 3 ===
| Party | | Political alignment |
|---|---|---|
| C | Conservatives | Centre-right |
| I | Liberal Alliance | Centre-right to Right-wing |
| O | Danish People's Party | Right-wing to Far-right |
| V | Venstre | Centre-right |
| Æ | Denmark Democrats | Right-wing to Far-right |

== Results by polling station ==
| Division | A | B | C | F | I | M | O | V | W | Æ | Ø | Å |
| Division | % | % | % | % | % | % | % | % | % | % | % | % |
|---|---|---|---|---|---|---|---|---|---|---|---|---|
| Frederikssund Midt | 21.1 | 3.8 | 8.2 | 13.5 | 21.0 | 0.5 | 9.6 | 15.3 | 0.2 | 2.0 | 3.5 | 1.3 |
| Frederikssund Nord | 19.6 | 3.2 | 7.8 | 14.8 | 20.1 | 0.4 | 10.0 | 16.2 | 0.2 | 2.7 | 3.7 | 1.2 |
| Frederikssund Syd | 18.2 | 4.9 | 8.2 | 14.2 | 22.6 | 0.6 | 9.2 | 15.8 | 0.3 | 2.0 | 3.1 | 0.8 |
| Skibby | 17.3 | 1.7 | 9.1 | 12.2 | 11.9 | 0.5 | 12.3 | 25.8 | 0.3 | 3.9 | 4.0 | 1.2 |
| Jægerspris | 24.7 | 2.5 | 7.3 | 12.5 | 17.5 | 0.6 | 12.1 | 12.1 | 0.1 | 3.8 | 5.0 | 1.9 |
| Slangerup | 15.7 | 2.5 | 7.5 | 9.1 | 14.4 | 1.1 | 12.1 | 31.0 | 0.2 | 2.3 | 2.7 | 1.5 |

== Results ==
| Party | | Votes | % | +/- | Seats | +/- |
Frederikssund Municipality
| A | Social Democrats | 5,228 | 19.52 | -9.99 | 5 | -2 |
| V | Venstre | 5,212 | 19.46 | -5.22 | 5 | -2 |
| I | Liberal Alliance | 4,743 | 17.71 | New | 4 | New |
| F | Green Left | 3,374 | 12.60 | +5.04 | 3 | +1 |
| O | Danish People's Party | 2,934 | 10.96 | +4.01 | 3 | +2 |
| C | Conservatives | 2,149 | 8.03 | -1.13 | 2 | 0 |
| Ø | Red-Green Alliance | 989 | 3.69 | -1.05 | 1 | 0 |
| B | Social Liberals | 818 | 3.05 | -0.34 | 0 | -1 |
| Æ | Denmark Democrats | 750 | 2.80 | New | 0 | New |
| Å | The Alternative | 362 | 1.35 | New | 0 | New |
| M | Moderates | 166 | 0.62 | New | 0 | New |
| W | Thomas Bech - Børn og Borgere først | 53 | 0.20 | New | 0 | New |
| Total | | 26,778 | 100 | N/A | 23 | N/A |
| Invalid votes | | 123 | 0.32 | -0.08 | | |
| Blank votes | | 440 | 1.14 | +0.15 | | |
| Turnout | | 27,341 | 71.05 | +1.82 | | |
Source: valg.dk

== Opinion polls ==
| Polling firm | Fieldwork date | Sample size | A | V | C | F | O | Ø | B | I | M | W | Æ | Å | Others | Lead |
|---|---|---|---|---|---|---|---|---|---|---|---|---|---|---|---|---|
| Epinion | 4 Sep - 13 Oct 2025 | 513 | 24.2 | 14.3 | 6.6 | 12.4 | 11.6 | 7.7 | 2.8 | 14.4 | 1.1 | – | 3.8 | 0.9 | 0.2 | 9.8 |
| 2024 european parliament election | 9 Jun 2024 | | 15.7 | 15.2 | 7.7 | 17.1 | 9.7 | 5.5 | 5.6 | 7.8 | 7.7 | – | 6.1 | 2.0 | – | 1.4 |
| 2022 general election | 1 Nov 2022 | | 29.3 | 14.6 | 5.0 | 7.7 | 4.3 | 3.9 | 2.7 | 7.4 | 10.1 | – | 6.9 | 2.2 | – | 14.7 |
| 2021 regional election | 16 Nov 2021 | | 29.9 | 20.2 | 12.4 | 8.1 | 6.5 | 5.3 | 4.4 | 1.2 | – | – | – | 0.3 | – | 9.7 |
| 2021 municipal election | 16 Nov 2021 | | 29.5 (7) | 24.7 (7) | 9.2 (2) | 7.6 (2) | 6.9 (1) | 4.7 (1) | 3.4 (1) | – | – | – | – | – | – | 4.8 |
