= Skuldelev =

- Village
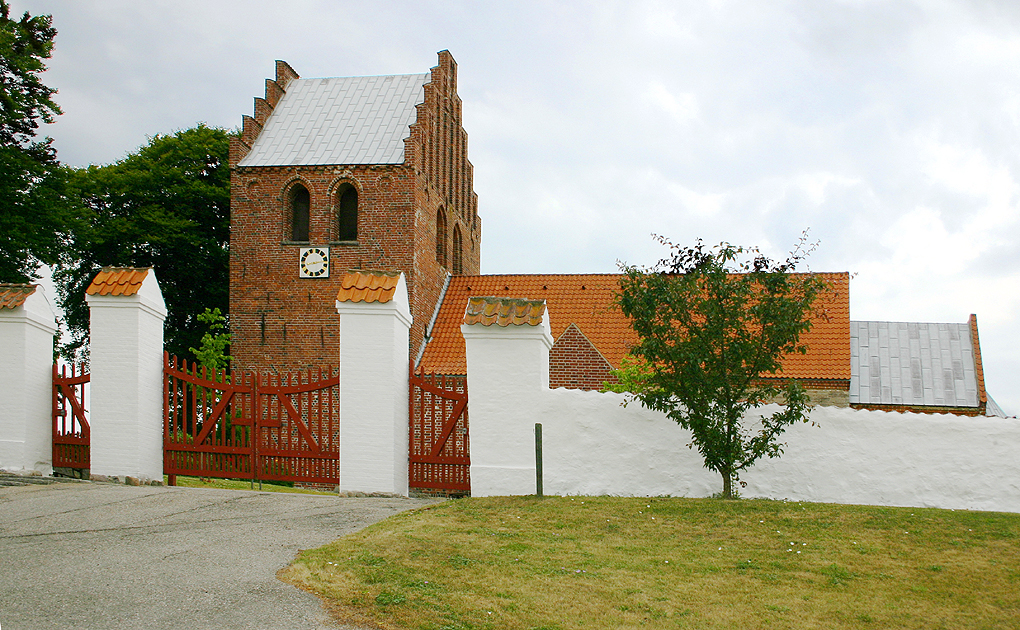
- Skuldelev Church, which was built in the 12th century.

- Location within Denmark Location within Capital Region
- Coordinates: 55°46′53″N 12°01′04″E
- Country: Denmark
- Region: Capital (Hovedstaden)
- Municipality: Frederikssund

Population (2026)
  - Urban: 843

Skuldelev is a town in the Frederikssund Municipality in North Zealand, Denmark. It is located 5 km northeast of Skibby, 11 km south of Jægerspris and 11 km southwest of Frederikssund. As of 2026, it has a population of 843.

In 1962, the remains of five original Viking ships were recovered from the waterway of Peberrenden at Skuldelev.

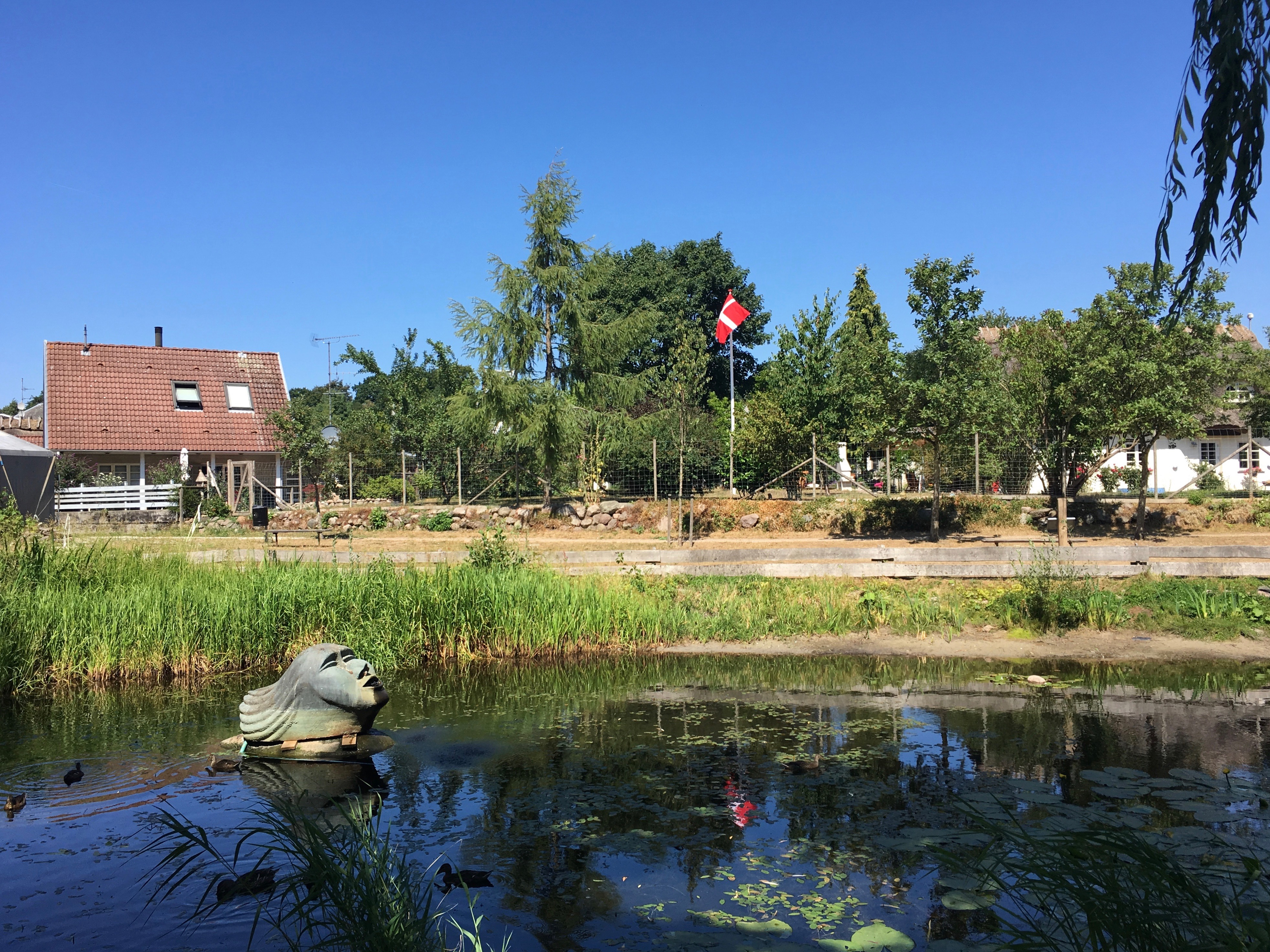
