= Gerlev =

- Village
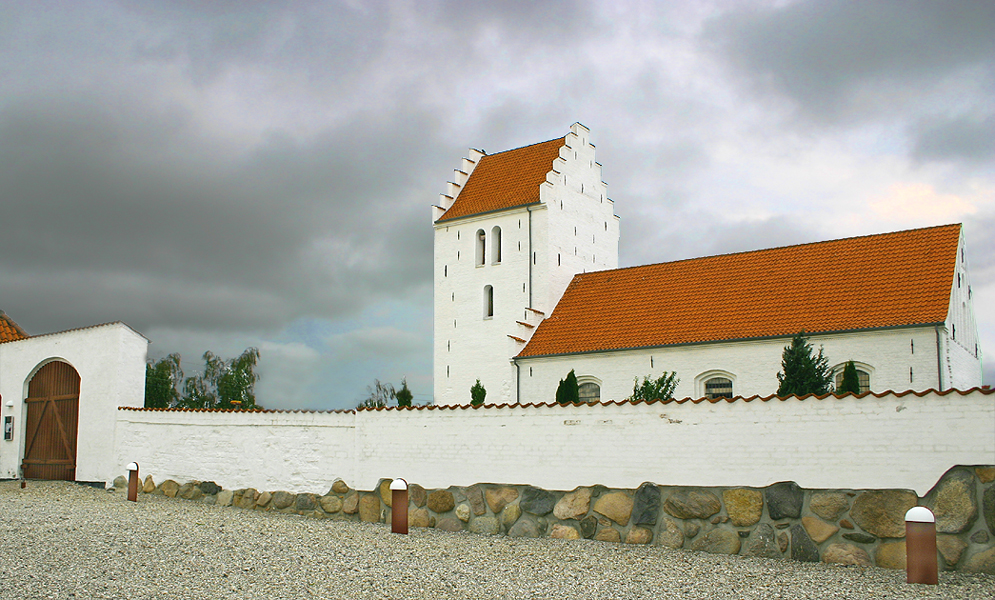
- Gerlev Church, which was built in the 12th century.

- Location within Denmark Location within Capital Region
- Coordinates: 55°49′14″N 12°00′49″E
- Country: Denmark
- Region: Capital (Hovedstaden)
- Municipality: Frederikssund

Area
  - Urban: 0.6 km^{2} (0.23 sq mi)

Population (2026)
  - Urban: 1,057
  - Urban density: 1,800/km^{2} (4,600/sq mi)

Gerlev is a town in the Frederikssund Municipality in North Zealand, Denmark. It is located on Hornsherred, five kilometers south of Jægerspris and six kilometers southwest of Frederikssund. As of 2026, it has a population of 1,057.

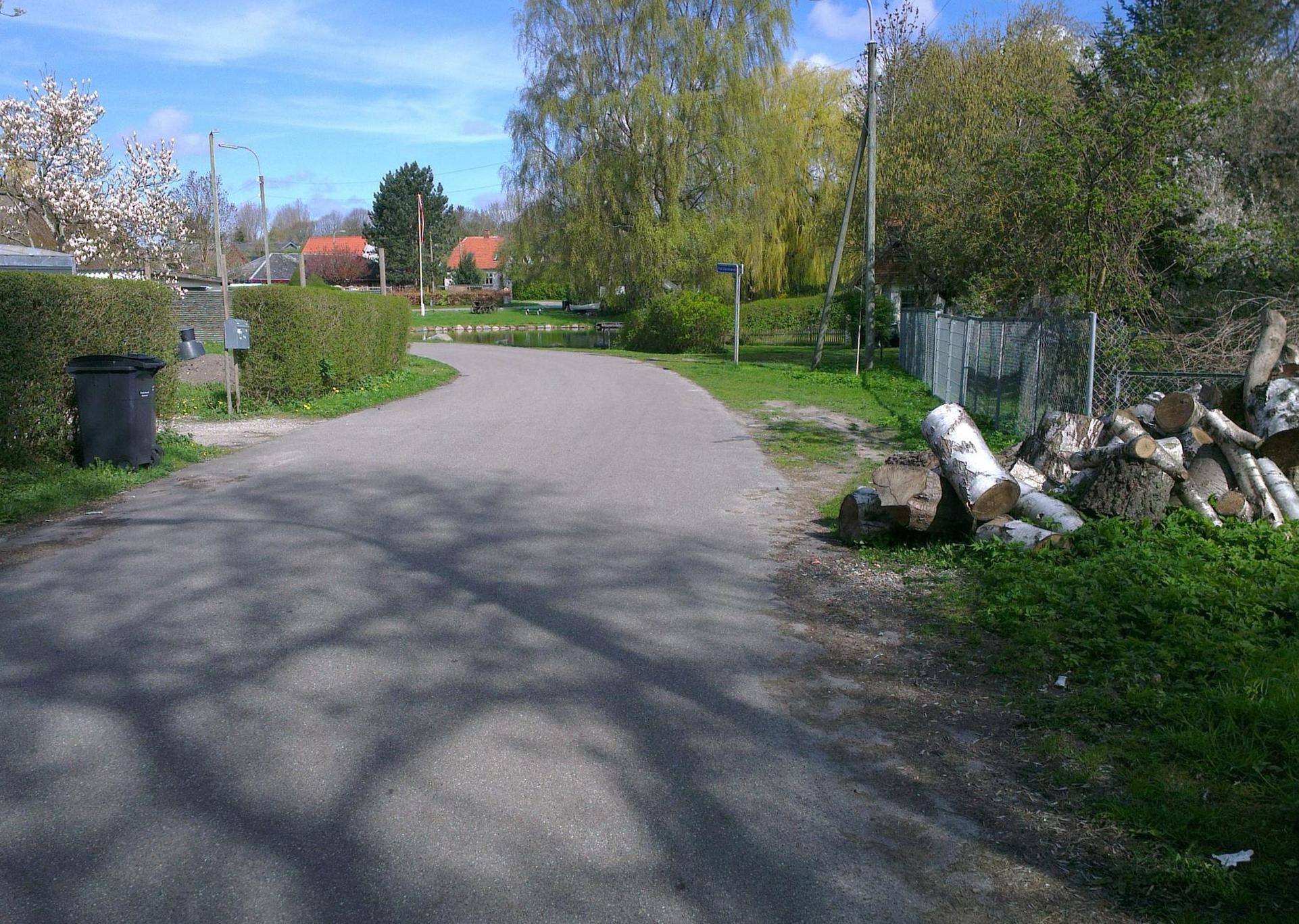
