= Gunnar Bech =

Danish linguist (1920–1981)

Gunnar Bech (March 23, 1920 in Græse, Frederikssund Municipality – January 17, 1981 in Copenhagen) was a Danish linguist. His magnum opus was Studies on the German Verbum Infinitum (Bech 1955/1957, reprinted 1983). It is perhaps the most widely cited single work on the German verb.

== Partial list of written works ==
- Gunnar Bech (1955). "Studien über das deutsche verbum infinitum" (PDF). Historisk-filologiske meddelelser (in German). 35 (2). Copenhagen: Royal Danish Academy of Sciences and Letters. ISSN 0902-1574. Wikidata Q109887591.
- Zur Syntax des tschechischen Konjunktivs. Kopenhagen 1951, at the same time: Phil. Diss. (Dissertation writing)
- Das germanische reduplizierte Präteritum (Det Kongelige Danske Videnskabernes Selskab, Historisk-filosofiske Meddelelser 44, no. 1, p. 1–54), Munksgaard København, 1969.
- Gunnar Bech (1952). "Bidrag til neksuslæren". Festskrift til L.L. Hammerich på Tresårsdagen. Den 31 Juli 1952 (in Danish). Wikidata Q61917147.
- Gunnar Bech (January 1963). "Grammatische Gesetze im widerspruch". Lingua (in German). 12 (3): 291–299. doi:10.1016/0024-3841(63)90039-1. ISSN 0024-3841. Wikidata Q109887521.
