= List of churches in Egedal Municipality =

This list of churches in Egedal Municipality lists church buildings in Egedal Municipality, Denmark.

== List ==
Name	Location	Year	Coordinates	Image	Refs
Ganløse Church	Ganløse	c. 1100	55°47′28.32″N 12°15′51.84″E		
Ledøje Church	Ledøje	c. 1225	55°42′38.1″N 12°17′47.4″E		
Slagslunde Church	Slagslunde	c. 1100			
Smørum Church	Smørumovre	c. 1100	55°44′1.68″N 12°16′41.87″E		
Stenløse Church	Stenløse	C. 1100	55°46′1.92″N 12°11′52.8″E		
Udlejre Church	Ølstykke	1991	55°47′38.04″N 12°19′11.52″E		
Veksø Church	Veksø	c. 1125	55°34′15.83″N 12°14′32.99″E		
Ølstykke Church	Ølstykke	c. 1125	55°46′58.43″N 12°10′30″E		

== See also ==
- Listed buildings in Gribskov Municipality
- List of churches in Helsingør Municipality
- List of churches in Hillerød Municipality
