= Kulhuse =

- Village
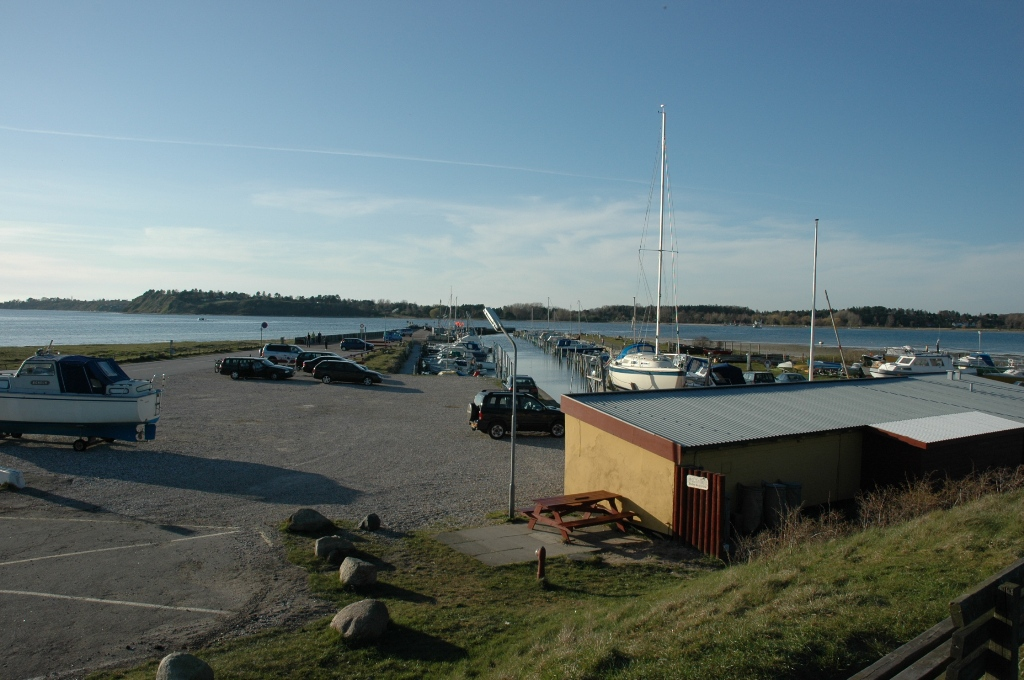
- Kulhuse harbor

- Location within Denmark Location within Capital Region
- Coordinates: 55°55′29″N 11°55′30″E
- Country: Denmark
- Region: Capital (Hovedstaden)
- Municipality: Frederikssund

Population (2026)
  - Urban: 864

Kulhuse is a town in the Frederikssund Municipality in North Zealand, Denmark. As of 2026, it has a population of 864.

It is a popular vacation destination, especially in the summer.

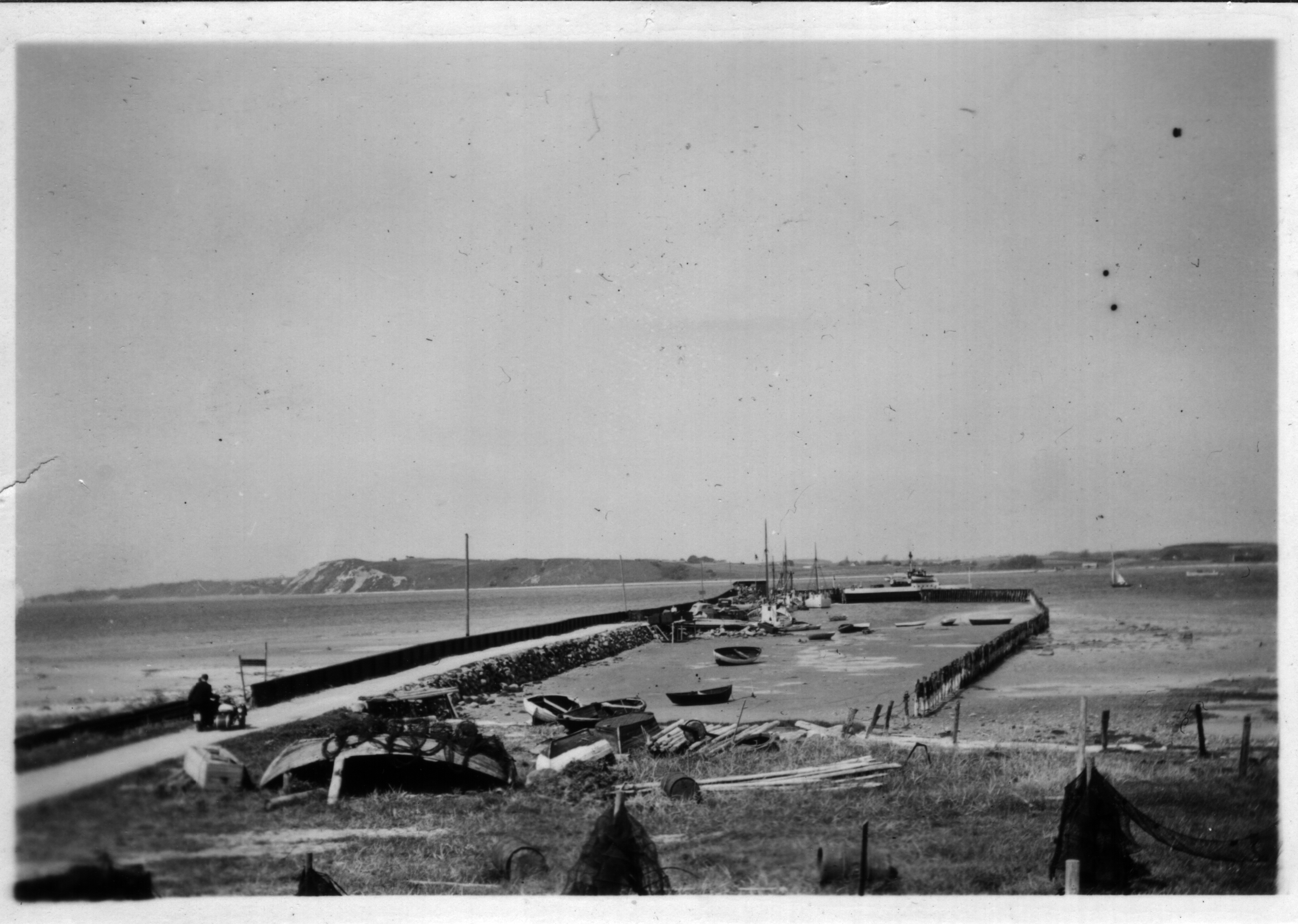
The harbor in 1938.
