= Jette Thyssen =

Danish textile artist, painter and lithographer

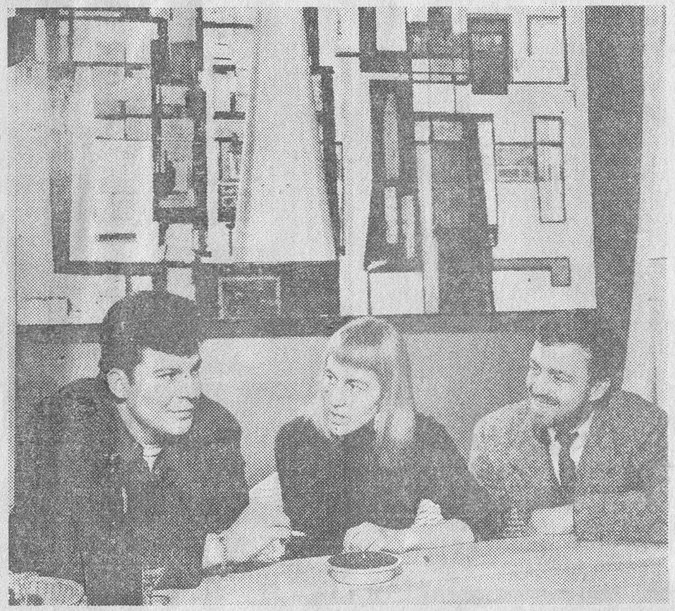
Jette Thyssen with Rudi Olsen and Åge Delbanco at the Montmartre Jazz Club, February 1959

Jette Thyssen (born 1933) is a Danish textile artist, painter and lithographer who produces brightly coloured, geometrically patterned compositions. She has decorated many buildings, including the Montmartre Jazz Club in Copenhagen for its opening in 1959 and the town hall in Frederikssund with a tapestry in 1987. Since the early 1970s, she has exhibited widely in Denmark and abroad.

== Biography ==
Born on 17 January 1933 in Frederikssund, Jette Thyssen is the daughter of Anders Thyssen (1901–1972) and Edel Busk Rasmussen (1903–1989). The third of five children, she was brought up in the large Sandal farm. During the German occupation in the Second World War, the family took care of resistance workers and Jews, including the weaver Ruth Malinowski who introduced her to textile art. She attended high school in Lyngby near Copenhagen, living with her grandmother. After graduating in 1950, she spent a year as an au pair in England before entered Copenhagen's Arts and Crafts School where she was taught by the Swedish textile artist Gunilla Lagerbielke.

On receiving her diploma in 1954, she spent six months in Italy where she was inspired by an American-Indian almost geometrically patterned carpet in painted leather at the Ethnographic Museum. In 1960, after receiving a French cultural scholarship, she went to Paris to study under Stanley William Hayter. Back in Copenhagen, in 1962 she exhibited at the Kunstforeningen where she sold one of her first carpets to the Danish Museum of Art & Design. The work in black, white and red was in the simple style which became characteristic of her later compositions, all created in bright, vivid colours. Her use of interacting geometrical shapes, including strongly coloured rectangles, squares and circles feature in her well balanced compositions. The round shapes often represent the sun while the straight lines can be the horizon. One of her creations depicts a blue fjord with a glowing red sun descending into the black forests on the other side.

In 1954, she married the painter Ole Strøygaard (born 1926) with whom she participated in the art group 6+2 until the early 1960s. The marriage was dissolved in 1963. From 1965 to 1973, her partner was the photographer Helmer Lund Hansen (1910–1992). They had a son together and adopted a child from Ethiopia.

In 1972, Thyssen arranged a solo exhibition at Den Frie Udstilling where she rented the two central rooms. It proved to be highly successful, establishing her as an artist at a time when there were relatively few weavers known for their artwork. Since the late 1970s, she has exhibited widely in Denmark and abroad.

A member of the Grønningen artists cooperative, in 2015 she celebrated 40 years of consistent participation in their exhibitions. In 2018, she contributed a variety of her large and smaller works to the tapestry exhibition in Copenhagen's Rundetaarn.
