= Græse Bakkeby =

- Village
- Location within Denmark Location within Capital Region
- Coordinates: 55°51′38″N 12°4′26″E
- Country: Denmark
- Region: Capital (Hovedstaden)
- Municipality: Frederikssund

Area
  - Urban: 0.73 km^{2} (0.28 sq mi)

Population (2026)
  - Urban: 2,273
  - Urban density: 3,100/km^{2} (8,100/sq mi)

Græse Bakkeby is a satellite town of Frederikssund in North Zealand. It is located 3 km north of Frederikssund, in the Capital Region of Denmark.

== Notable people ==
- Gunnar Bech (1920 in Græse – 1981) a Danish linguist, studied the German verb
