= Sophie Holten =

Danish painter

Sofie Holten
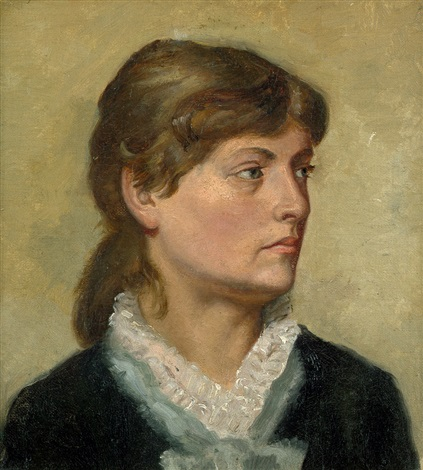
- Portrait of Sofie Holten by Otto Bache
- Born: 12 August 1858; Skuldelev, Denmark
- Died: 5 June 1930 (aged 71); Roskilde, Denmark
- Education: School of the Art Institute of Chicago; Columbia University; University of Virginia; Art Students League of New York
- Known for: Painting

Sofie Holten (12 August 1858 – 5 June 1930) was a Danish painter who created portraits, flower paintings and genre works. She is remembered in particular for her portraits of August Strindberg and L. A. Ring. She was also active in social work and feminism.

== Biography ==
Born on 12 August 1858 in Skuldelev, Denmark, Sofie Holten was the daughter of the parish priest Hans Nicolai Holten (1829–1871) and Marenstine Smith (1830–1913). She received private instruction in painting from Christen Dalsgaard in Sorø and later from Carl Thomsen in Copenhagen. From 1875 to 1876, she attended N. Zahle's School. In 1879, she went to Paris where she studied the most modern methods of painting with teachers including Félix-Joseph Barrias and Alfred Stevens. On returning to Denmark, she exhibited at the Charlottenborg Spring Exhibition in 1883.

Shortly afterwards, she returned to Paris, exhibiting in the Salon (1886–1887). In the 1890s, she travelled to the Nethlerlands, Germany, Italy, England and Greece. Holten exhibited her work at the Palace of Fine Arts at the 1893 World's Columbian Exposition in Chicago, Illinois. She continued to exhibit in Charlottenborg until 1904, presenting genre works, portraits and flower paintings. In addition to her portrait of Strindberg, her Brudstykke af Parthenons Cellefrise (1901) and her painting of the Erechtheion (1904) attracted attention.

As a young women, Holten exhibited confidence in her own abilities which encouraged her to avoid marriage. In the late 1880s, she wrote reviews of female artists in Kvinden og Samfundet which was published by the Danish Women's Society. She also lectured on clothing, calling for attire which would free women from their traditional role of the housewife. She was one of the driving forces behind the Copenhagen Women's Exhibition in 1895, supporting a proposal for a women's exhibition building (although this was not realized until 1936).

In later life, after a period in Assisi, Italy, Holten became a Roman Catholic. Settling in Roskilde with her friend Erikke Rosenørn-Lehn, she decorated the city's St Laurenti Church. For this work she received the Pro Ecclesia et Pontifice award. She is buried in Roskilde at the Old Church of Our Lady.

== Gallery ==
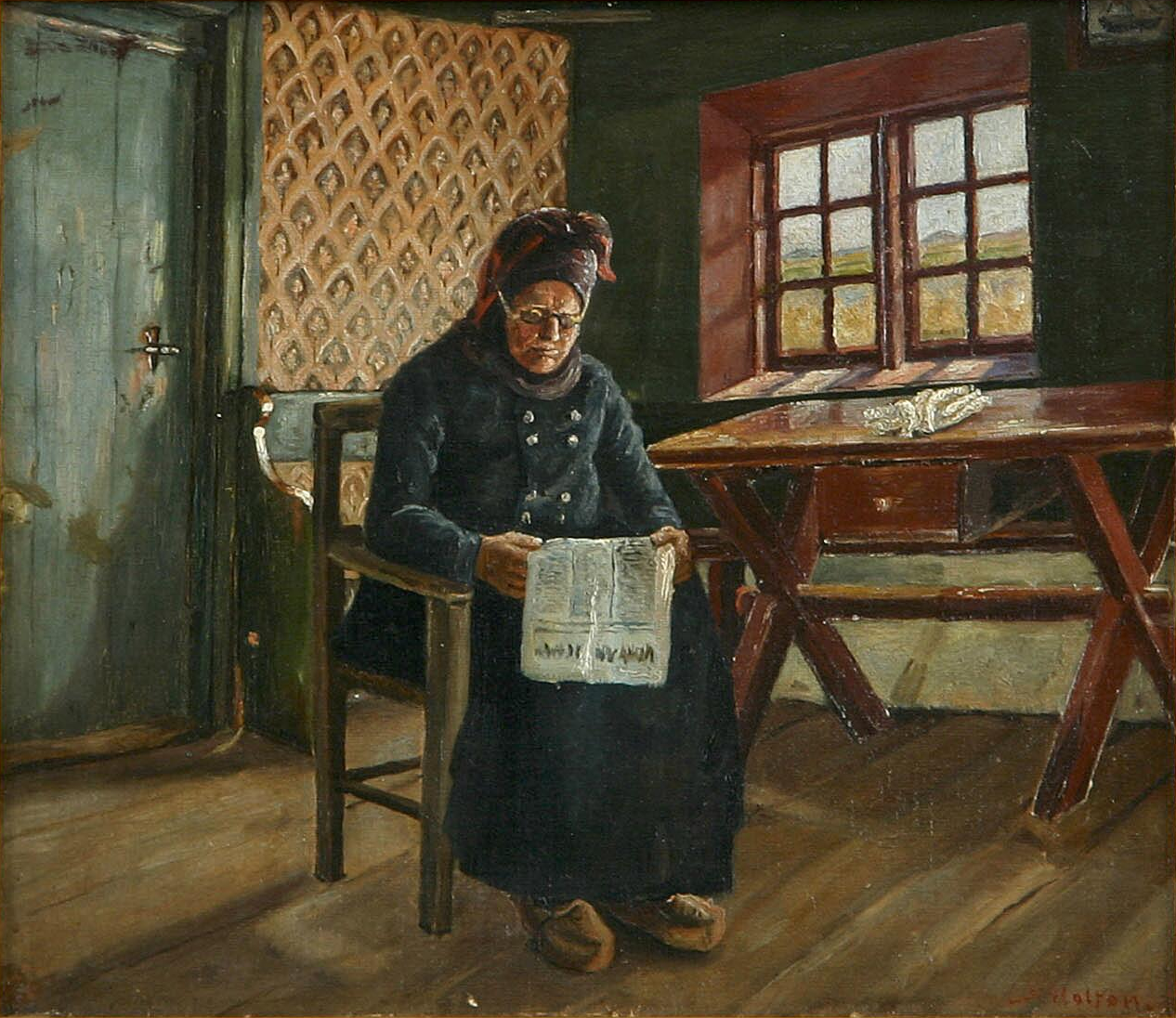
Interiør med kone der læser sin avis, oil on canvas

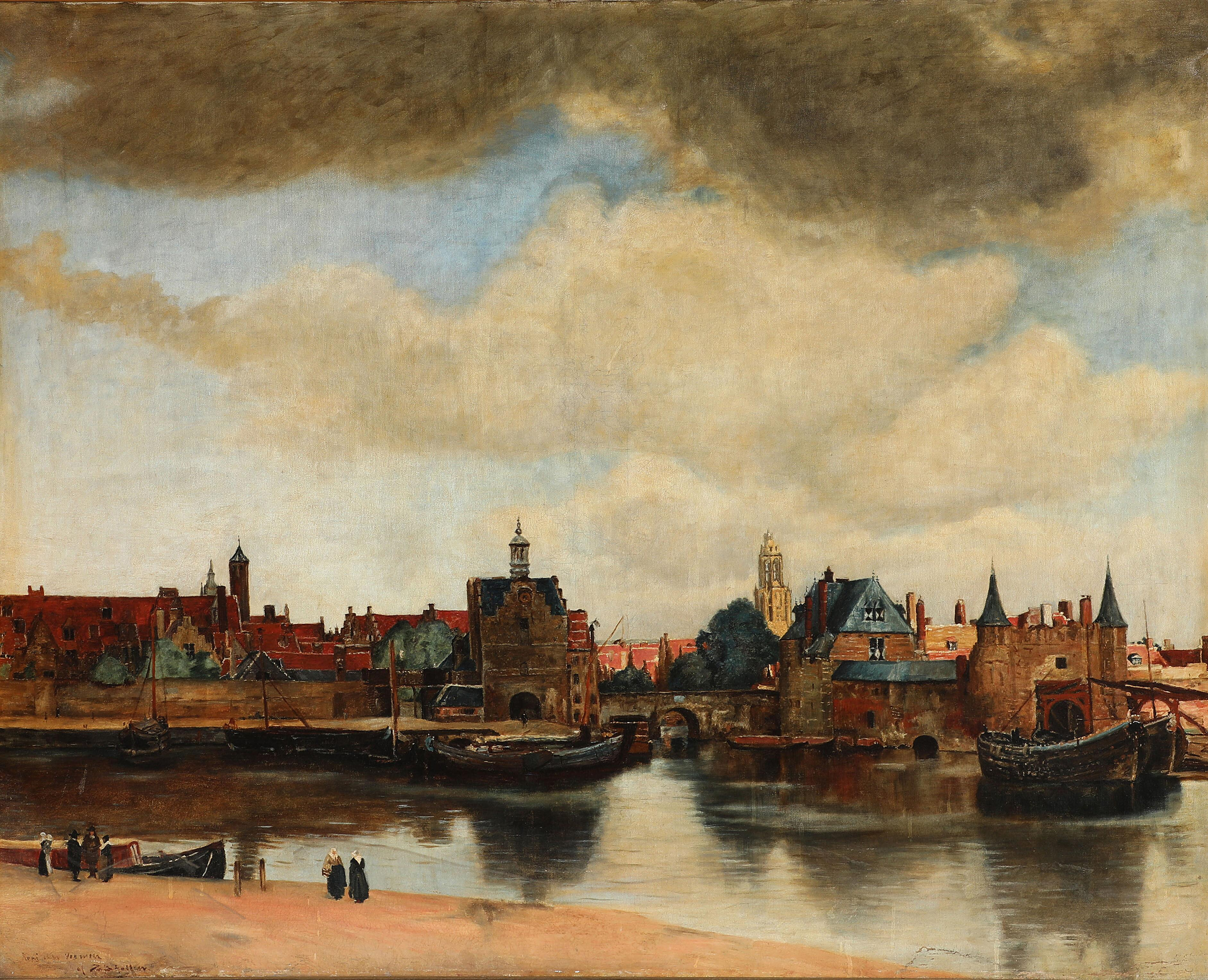
View on Delft, oil on canvas, copied after a work by Johannes Vermeer

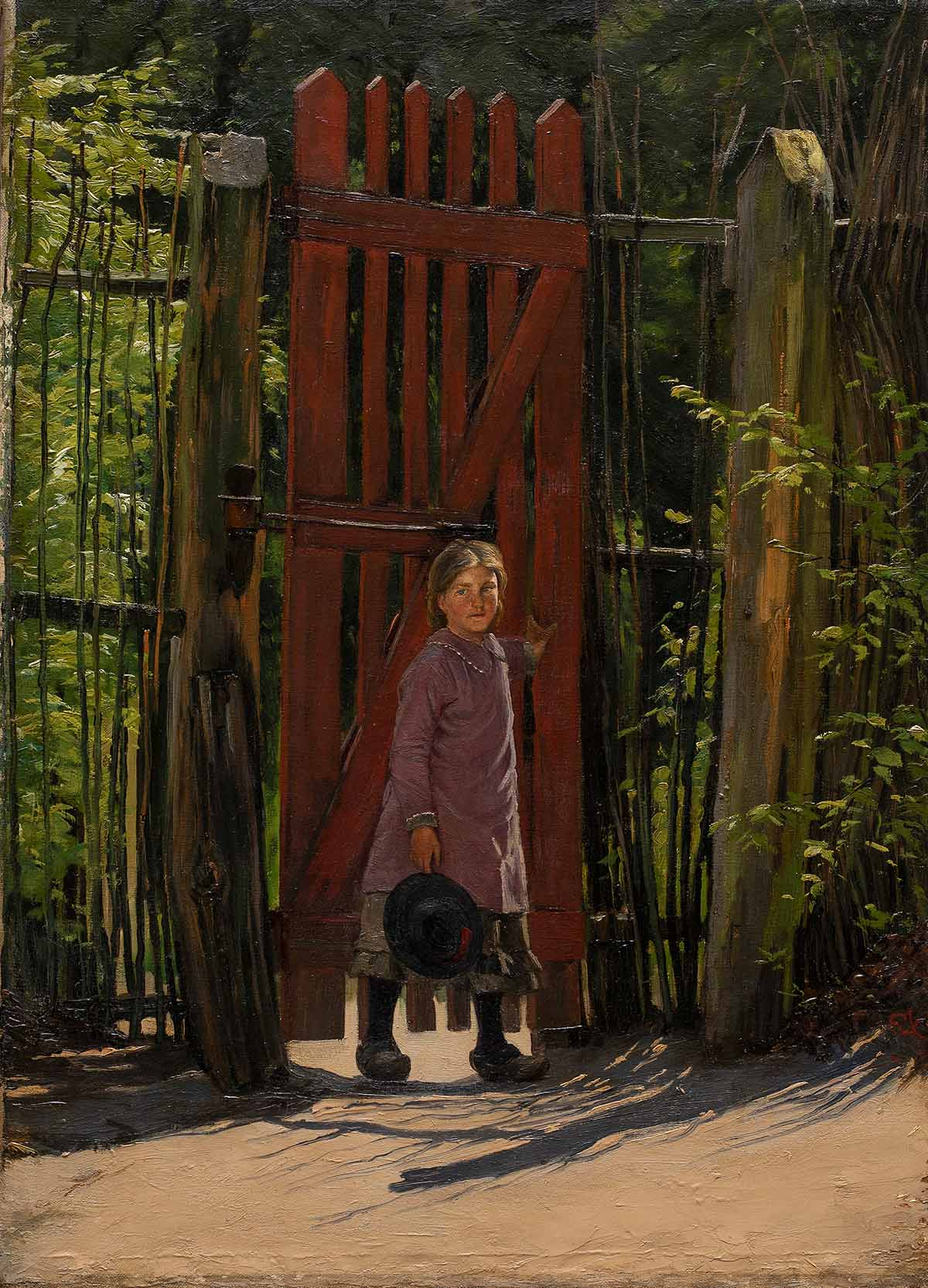
En lille pige ved en rød låge, oil on canvas

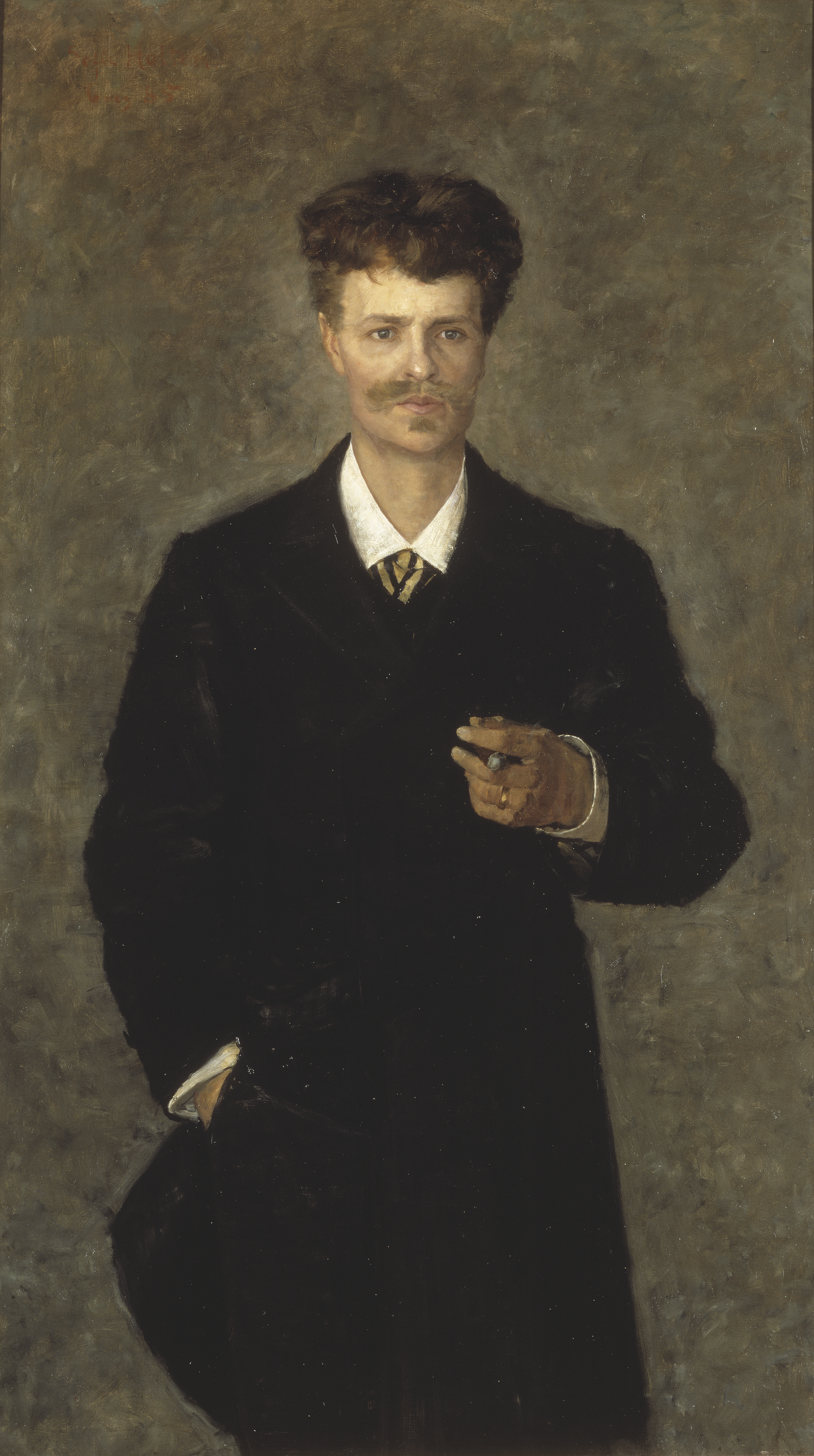
August Strindberg 1849–1912, oil on canvas, 1885

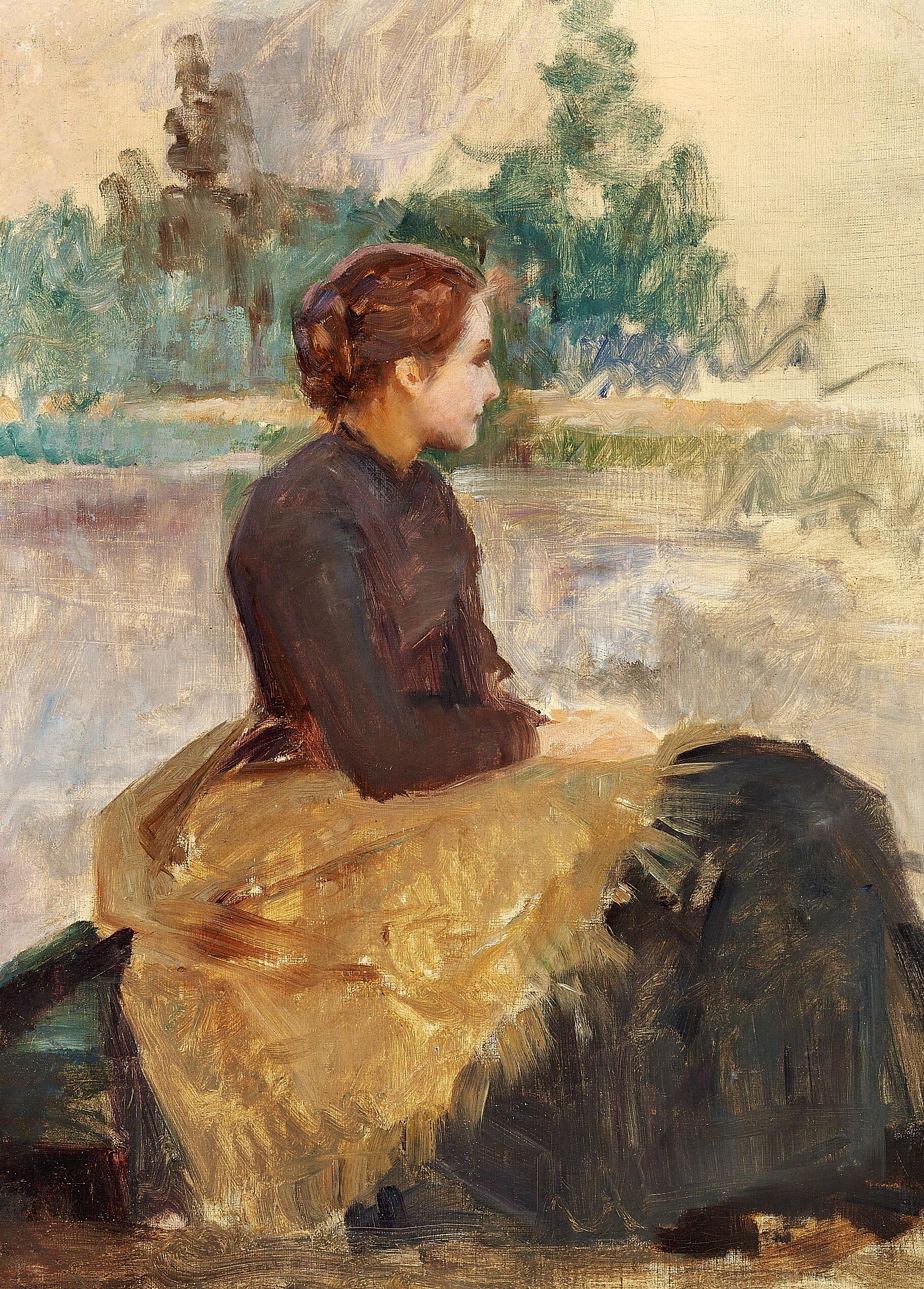
Ung kvinde siddende ved en søbred, oil on canvas, 1885

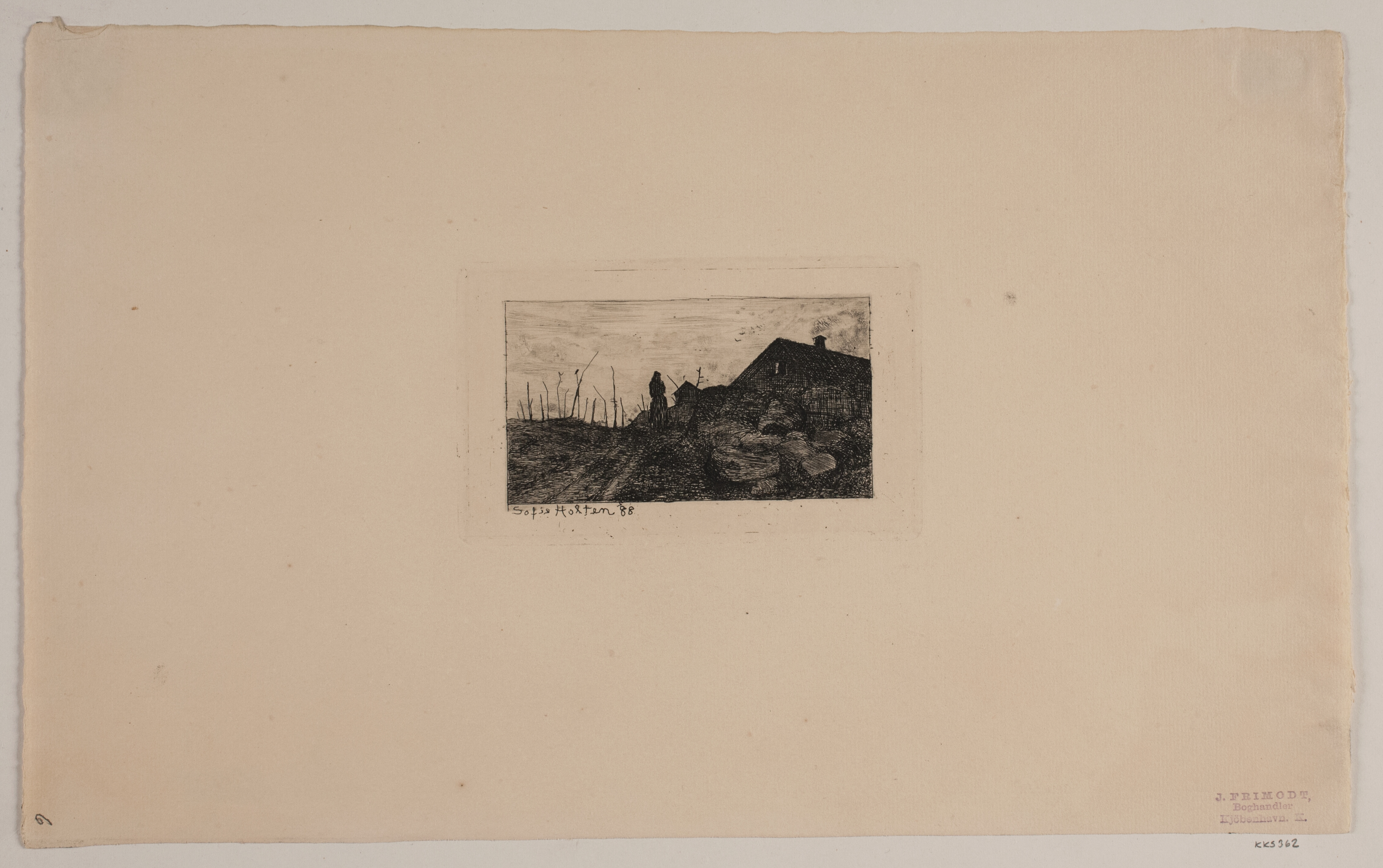
Landskab med huse, etching print,1888
