= Hornsherred =

Coordinates: 55.8°N 12°E

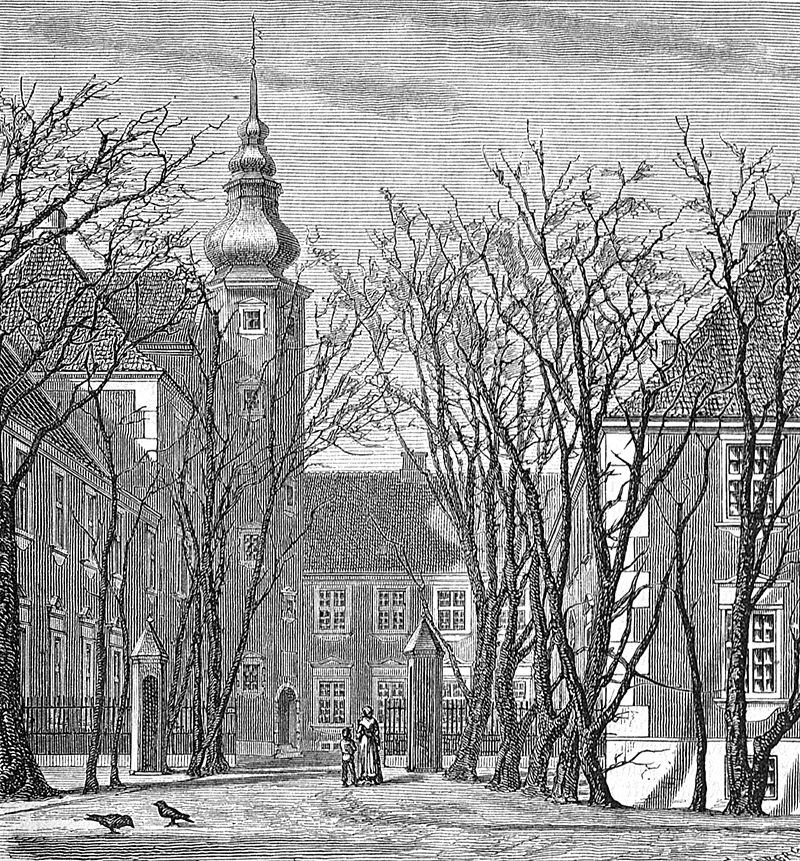
Old print of Jægerspris Castle

Hornsherred (Danish pronunciation: [ˈhoɐ̯ˀnsˌhɛɐ̯ð̩]) is a peninsula between Roskilde Fjord and Isefjord on the island of Zealand in eastern Denmark.

It falls within the expanded Frederikssund municipality and includes Jægerspris and Skibby and before 1 January 2007 a part of Bramsnæs Municipality, now a part of Lejre Municipality. It is connected to Frederikssund by the Kronprins Frederik bridge which was built in 1935. The area is increasingly popular as a venue for tourists with facilities for walking, cycling and sailing.

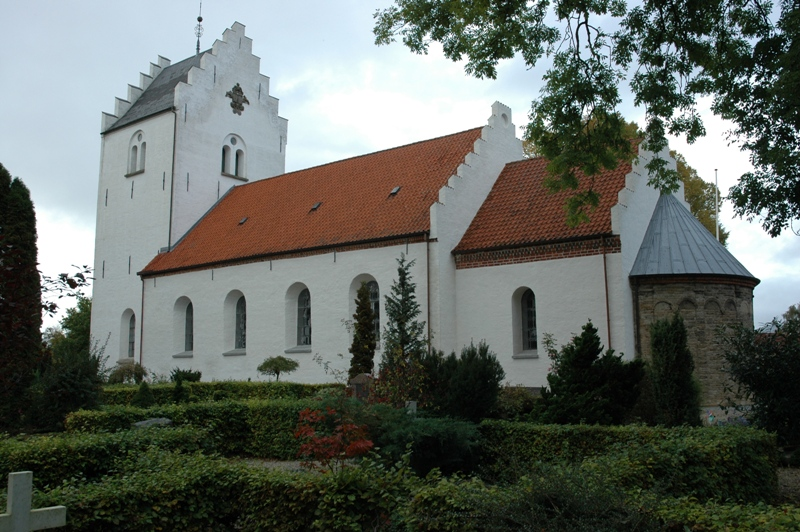
Skibby Church

== Attractions ==
Hornsherred has a variety of attractions including Jægerspris Castle, the Færgegård Museum of Local History and the walking and cycling tracks around the peninsula. There is a yachting harbour at Jægerspris. The peninsula also has a number of Stone Age burial sites. Skibby Church with frescoes dating back to the Middle Ages is one of the main cultural attractions.
