= Jacob Berthelsen =

Danish footballer (born 1986)

Personal information
- Date of birth: July 4, 1986 (age 40)
- Place of birth: Jægerspris, Denmark
- Height: 1.85 m (6 ft 1 in)
- Position: Centre-back

Youth career
- Jægerspris IK
- Frederikssund IK
- Farum BK
- -2008: Brøndby IF

Senior career*
Years	Team	Apps	(Gls)
2006-2010	Brøndby IF	20	(1)
2009	→ Akademisk BK (loan)	3	(0)
2010-2012	FC Fredericia	46	(3)
2012-2014	Brønshøj BK	44	(5)
2014-2017	AC Horsens	50	(4)
2017	Greve Fodbold		
2018	FC Roskilde		
2018-2019	Brønshøj BK		
- * Club domestic league appearances and goals

Jacob Berthelsen (born 4 July 1986) is a Danish retired professional football player.

Berthelsen debuted for Brøndby's first team 20 September 2006 against Brønshøj in the Danish Cup.
