= Peter Beier =

Danish chocolate manufacturing company

Peter Beier Chokolade A/S
- Type: Privately held company
- Industry: Chocolate production
- Founded: 1996
- Founder: Linda and Peter Beier
- Headquarters: Ørsholt, Denmark
- Area served: Worldwide
- Products: Chocolate Bars
- Website: www.pbchokolade.dk

Peter Beier Chokolade, usually referred to as Peter Beier, is a Danish premium chocolate manufacturing and retailing company founded by Linda and Peter Beier in 1996. It is based at the Ørsholt estate outside Helsingør.

== History ==
Peter Beier was born in Slangerup in 1965. He was educated as a pastry chef in Stubbekøbing on the island of Falster in 1985 and headed Magasin du Nord's chokolaterie from 1987. Linda Beier has a law degree from University of Copenhagen. They founded Peter Beier Chokolade in 1996. The first Peter Beier chocolate store opened in Copenhagen in 2000 and the first combined café and chocolate store opened on Falkoner Allé in Frederiksberg in 2002. In 2003, the company acquired its own cocoa plantation in the Dominican Republic to have better control of the supply chain. Another 11 stores opened between 2003 and 2014. The first store outside Denmark opened in Malmö, Sweden. It was followed by a store in Dubai in 2016.

== Products ==
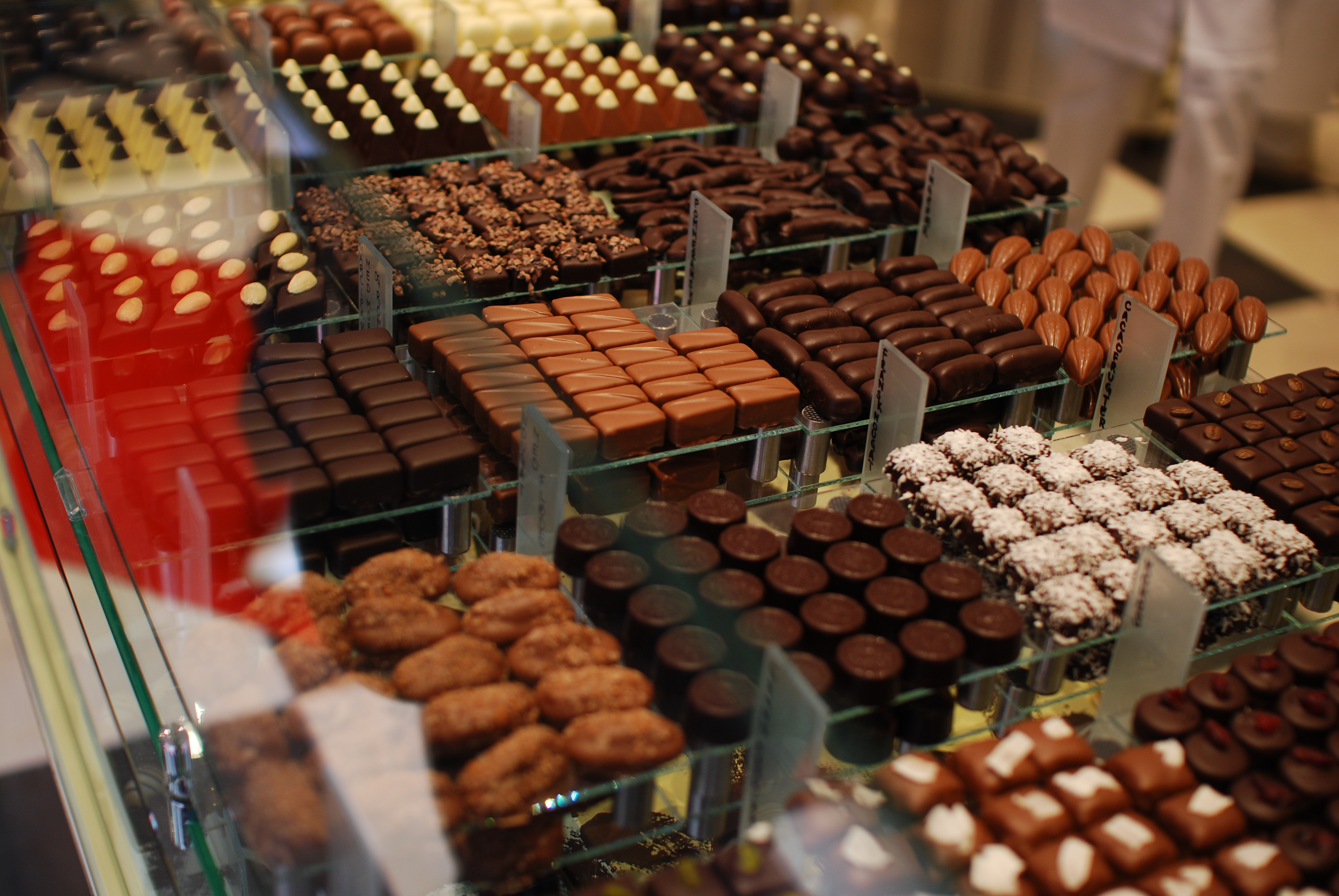
Peter Beier chocolates in the Peter Beier store in Hellerup, Copenhagen

The product range includes filled chocolates, chocolate pastilles, chocolate powder and traditional Danish products such as flødeboller and pålægschokolade

== Chocolate stores ==
As of 2015, Peter Beier has 19 chocolate stores of which five are shop-in-shop concepts operated in collaboration with Meny supermarkets. The company also has its own online store.

=== Denmark ===
Copenhagen

- Skoubogade 1 (Strøget), city centre
- Store Kongensgade 3, city centre
- Terminal 2, Copenhagen Airport, Amager
- Falkoner Allé 43, Frederiksberg
- Nordre Frihavnsgade 20m Østerbrogade
- Rotundenm Strandvejen 64A, Hellerup
- Lyngby Hovedgade 47, Kongens Lyngby
- Vermlandsgade 51 (Meny), Amager
- Nærumvænge Torv 18 (Meny), Nærum
- Bagsværd Hovedgade 128 (Meny), Bagsværd

Helsingør

- Ørsholtvej 35

Hørsholm

- Hovedgaden, Hørsholm Midtpunkt 16
- Kongevejs Centret 6 (Meny), Hørsholm

Stenløse

- Egedal Centret 33, st., Stenløse

Aalborg

- Otto Mønsteds Vej 1 (Meny), Aalborg

Aarhus

- Ryesgade 35, Aarhus

Odense

- Mågebakken 4-6 (Meny), Odense

=== Sweden ===
Helsingborg

- Södra Storgatan 5, Helsingborg

Malmö

- Baltzargatan 32

== Chocolate lounges ==
Two "chocolate lounges" are currently operated in association with the chocolate stores in Store Kongensgade and Nordre Frihavnsgade in Copenhagen. In 2016, it was announced that a chocolaterie with on-site chocolate production and café will open in Axel Towers, opposite the main entrance to Tivoli Gardens.

== Controversy ==
In October 2025, Danish newspaper Politiken reported that Peter Beier faced criticism for using video surveillance to monitor and reprimand employees. Former staff described the constant monitoring as creating a stressful and psychologically harmful work environment, with one employee saying they were "about to completely break down". Experts quoted in the article described the practice as invasive and contrary to good management and workplace ethics.
