= St. Vincent's Church, Helsingør =

St. Vincent's Church
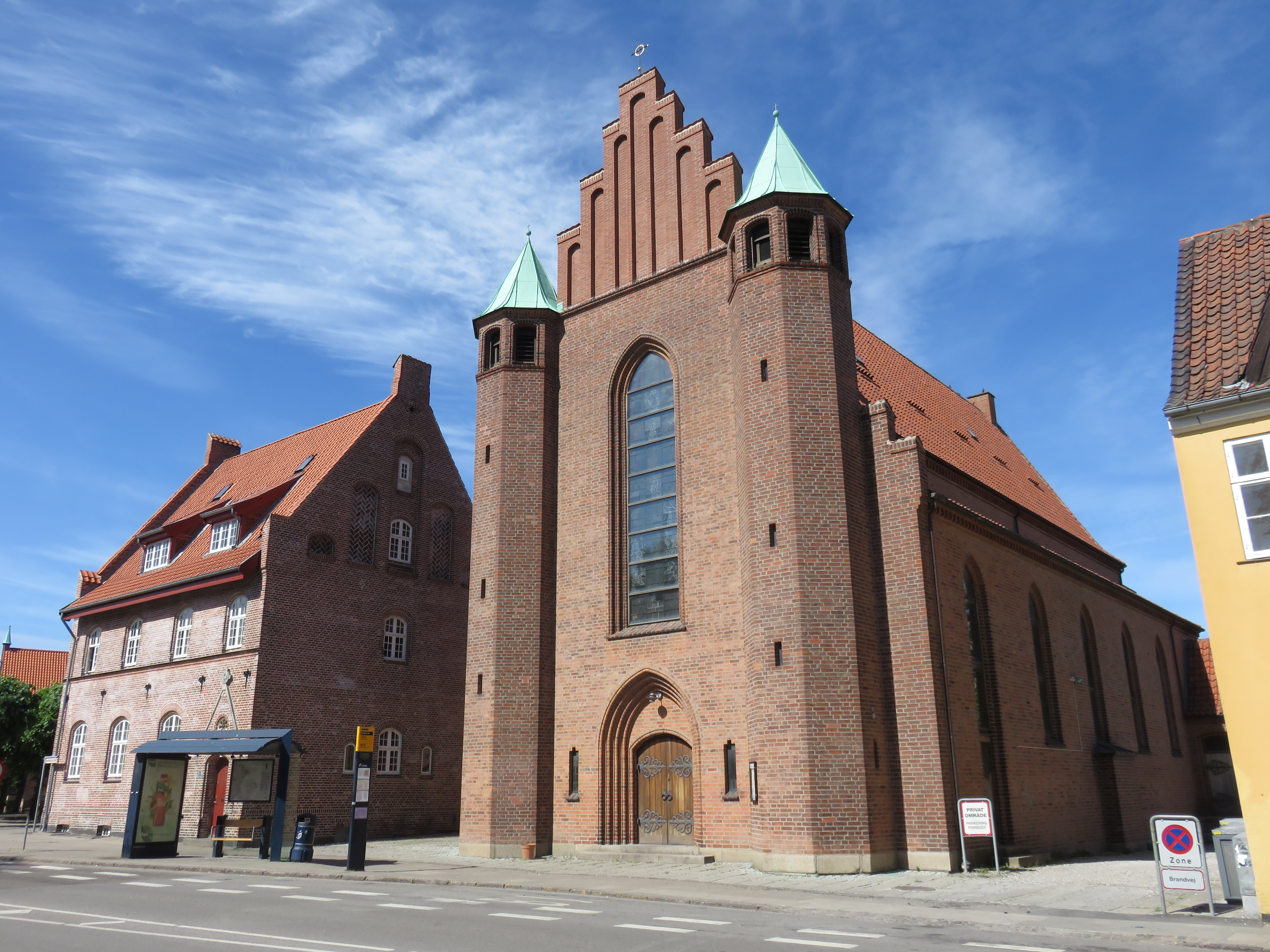
- St. Vincent's Church with the rectory to the left.
- St. Vincent's Church
- 56°2′14.8″N 12°36′28.3″E
- Location: Helsingør
- Country: Denmark
- Denomination: Roman Catholic

History
- Status: Church
- Founded: 1931
- Dedication: Vincent de Paul

Architecture
- Functional status: Active
- Architect: Emil Jørgensen
- Style: National Romantic

Administration
- Diocese: Copenhagen

St. Vincent Church (Danish: Sankt Vincent Kirke) is a parish of the Roman Catholic Church in Helsingør, Denmark. The church, consecrated in 1930, is the only Roman Catholic church in North Zealand. It is located in Nygade, opposite Helsingør Cemetery. It is dedicated to the French saint Vincent de Paul and administered by the Vincentian Fathers.

== History ==
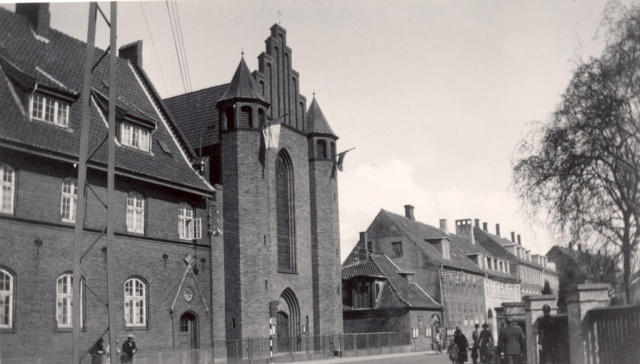
St. Vincent's church

The church was designed by Næstved architect Johannes Tideman-Dal. The foundation stone was set on 4 October 1928 and the church was consecrated on 26 October 1930.

A group of Sisters of Charity of Saint Vincent De Paul began to operate in Helsingør in connection with the opening of the church.

== Architecture ==
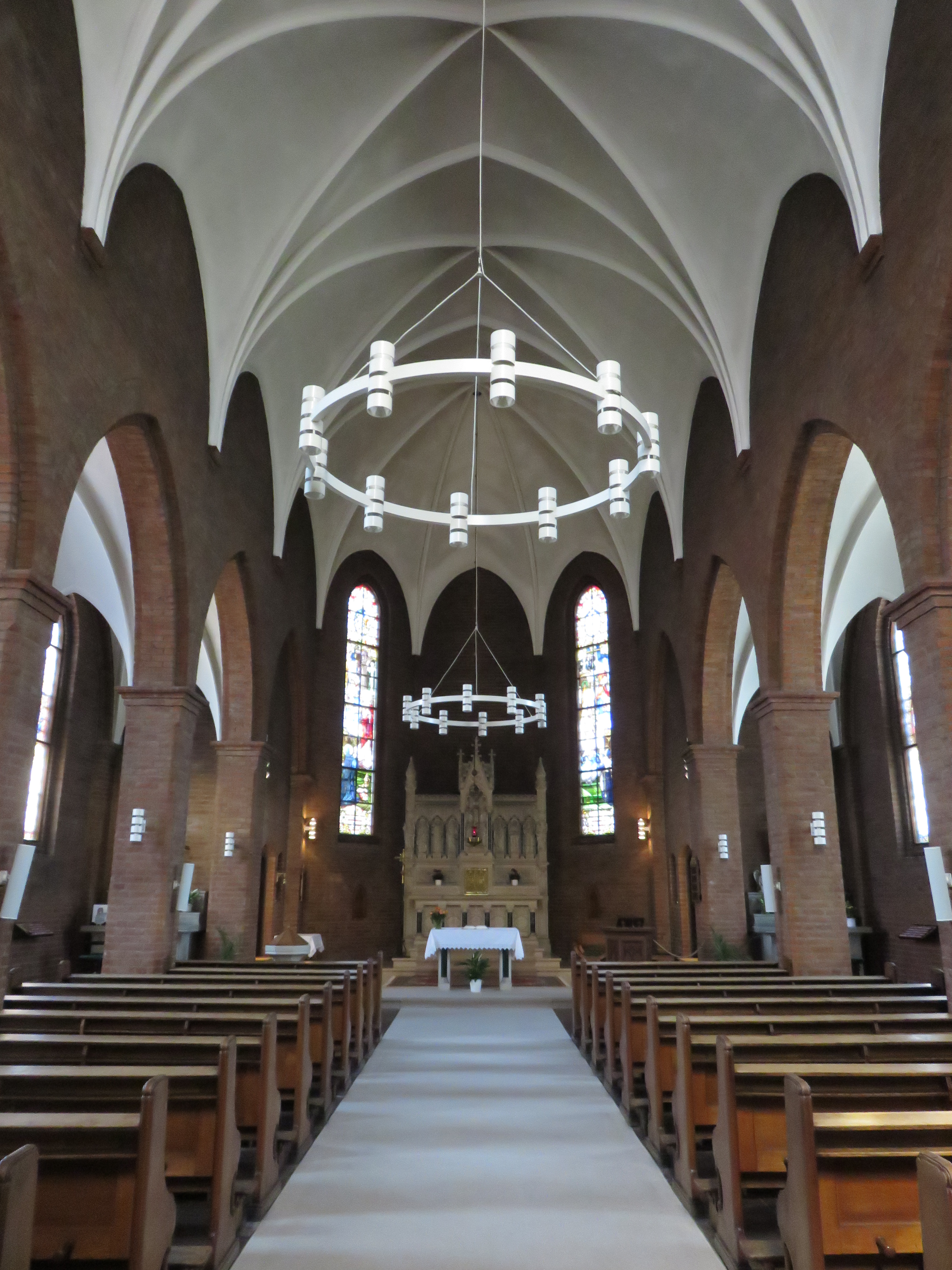
Interior

The church is built to a Neo-Gothic design in handmade red brick. The style was inspiration by the city's original Catholic churches dating from before the Reformation.

The site also includes a rectory and a new parish hall built in 1991, designed by Gabor Kali.

== Interior ==
Much of the interior furnishings are from Belgium and were acquired with the assistance of Josef Ludwig Brems, Vicar Apostolic of Denmark 1922–1938. The three carved altars and the stations of the Cross were created in Pierre de Caen limestone. The windows with glass mosaics are also from Belgium.
