= List of churches in Helsingør Municipality =

This list of churches in Helsingør Municipality lists church buildings in Helsingør Municipality, Denmark.

== Church of Denmark ==
Name	Location	Year	Coordinates	Image	Refs
Egebæksvang Church	Helsingør	1897	55°59′41.9″N 12°33′39.21″E		
Gurre Church	Gurre	1918	56°01′23.92″N 12°32′23.25″E		
Hellebæk Church	Hellebæk				
St Mary's Church	Helsingør	15th century	56°02′13″N 12°36′48″E		
Hornbæk Church	Hornbæk	1737	56°05′29.04″N 12°27′30.23″E		
Kronborg Chapel	Helsingør	1582	56°02′19.31″N 12°37′19.55″E		
St Mary's Church	Helsingør	15th century	56°02′13″N 12°36′48″E		
St. Olaf's Church	Helsingør	1559	56°02′8.6″N 12°36′51″E		
Sthen's Church	Helsingør	12th century	55°0′57.4″N 12°06′41.4″E		
Tikøb Church	Tikøb				
Vestervang Church	Vestervang	1966	56°02′00″N 12°35′23″E		

== Other ==
Name	Location	Year	Coordinates	Image	Refs
St. Vincent's Church	Helsingør				

== See also ==
- Listed buildings in Helsingør Municipality
