= Gunilla Lagerbielke =

Swedish textile artist

- Born: Edit Gunilla Margareta Lagerbielke; 24 July 1926; Stockholm, Sweden
- Died: 15 August 2013 (aged 87); Stockholm, Sweden
- Known for: Textile Art
- Spouse: Lars Johanson

Edit Gunilla Margareta Lagerbielke (1926–2013) was a Swedish textile artist who exerted considerable influence on arts and crafts in Sweden as a result of her heading Konstfack and chairing the Swedish Arts Grants Committee. Lagerbielke is also noted for her collaborative textile works with her husband, Lars Johanson, which were exhibited in Gothenburg in 1970.

== Biography ==
Born on 24 July 1926 in Stockholm, Edit Gunilla Margareta Lagerbielke was the daughter of Baron Ernst Gustaf Lagerbjelke (1897–1932) and Countess Signe Margaretha Hamilton (1902–1989). After her well-to-do father died when she was only five, she was brought up by her mother in the centre of Stockholm. On matriculating from the girls high school, she studied textile art at the college which soon became known as Konstfackskolan.

From 1951 to 1956, Lagerbielke taught textile art at the Arts and Crafts School in Copenhagen. Thanks to a grant from the Swedish-America Foundation, she then went on a nine-month study trip to the United States with her newly-wedded husband, Lars Johanson, whom she had met while studying at Konstfack. On returning to Sweden, they worked together as Lars and Gunilla Johanson, presenting a large exhibition of their work in 1970 at the Röhsska Museum in Gothenburg titled "Textila bilder och figurer" (Textile Pictures and Figures). Her marriage did not survive as Johanson became increasingly dominant, preventing her from creating her own works. After their divorce in 1975, Lagerbielke found a position with the Stockholm Lekmiljörådet (Play Environment Council) where she developed support for pre-school children, later heading the department (1972–78).

In 1978, she was appointed rector of Konstfack, where she remained for the next twelve years. Thereafter she received many government assignments, including the modernization of art colleges and the development of art in public places. In the 1990s, she became deputy head of the Swedish Art Grants Committee and head of the Swedish Visual Arts Foundation. In particular, she was effective in developing a more international approach to the work of these bodies, improving Sweden's worldwide image.

In later life, Lagerbielke returned to textile art, this time creating embroidery designs. She exhibited at the Galleri Inger Molin in 2004, 2006 and 2012.

Gunilla Lagerbielke died in Stockholm on 15 August 2013. She is survived by her daughter Erika Lagerbielke (born 1960), a designer who works mainly with glass.
