= List of churches in Hillerød Municipality =

This list of churches in Hillerød Municipality lists church buildings in Hillerød Municipality, Denmark.

== List ==
Name	Location	Year	Coordinates	Image	Refs
Alsønderrup Church	Alsøndertup	14th century	55°58′12.9″N 12°13′36.1″E		
Frederiksborg Chapel	Blistrup	1617	55°56′5.7″N 12°18′2.3″E		
Gadevang Church	Gadevang	1987	55°56′14″N 12°20′40″E		
Grønnevang Church	1904	55°57′42″N 12°16′55.8″E			
Gørløse Church	Gørløse				
Hillerød Church	Hillerød	1874	55°55′46.37″N 12°18′23.69″E		
Lille Lyngby Church	Lille Lyngby				
Nødebo Church	Nødebo	13th century	55°58′34.3″N 12°20′45.6″E		
Nørre Herlev Chapel	Nørre Herlev	c. 1450	55°53′15.5″N 12°16′26″E		
Præstevang Church	Hillerød	1962	55°55′54.8″N 12°19′2.1″E		
Skævinge Church	Skævinge	c. 1100	55°54′33″N 12°09′07″E		
Strø Church		12th century	55°53′39.9″N 12°9′2.1″E		
Tjæreby Church	Tjæreby				
Ullerød Church	Hillerød				
Uvelse Chapel	Uvelse				

== See also ==
- Listed buildings in Hillerød Municipality
