= Skibby =

- Town
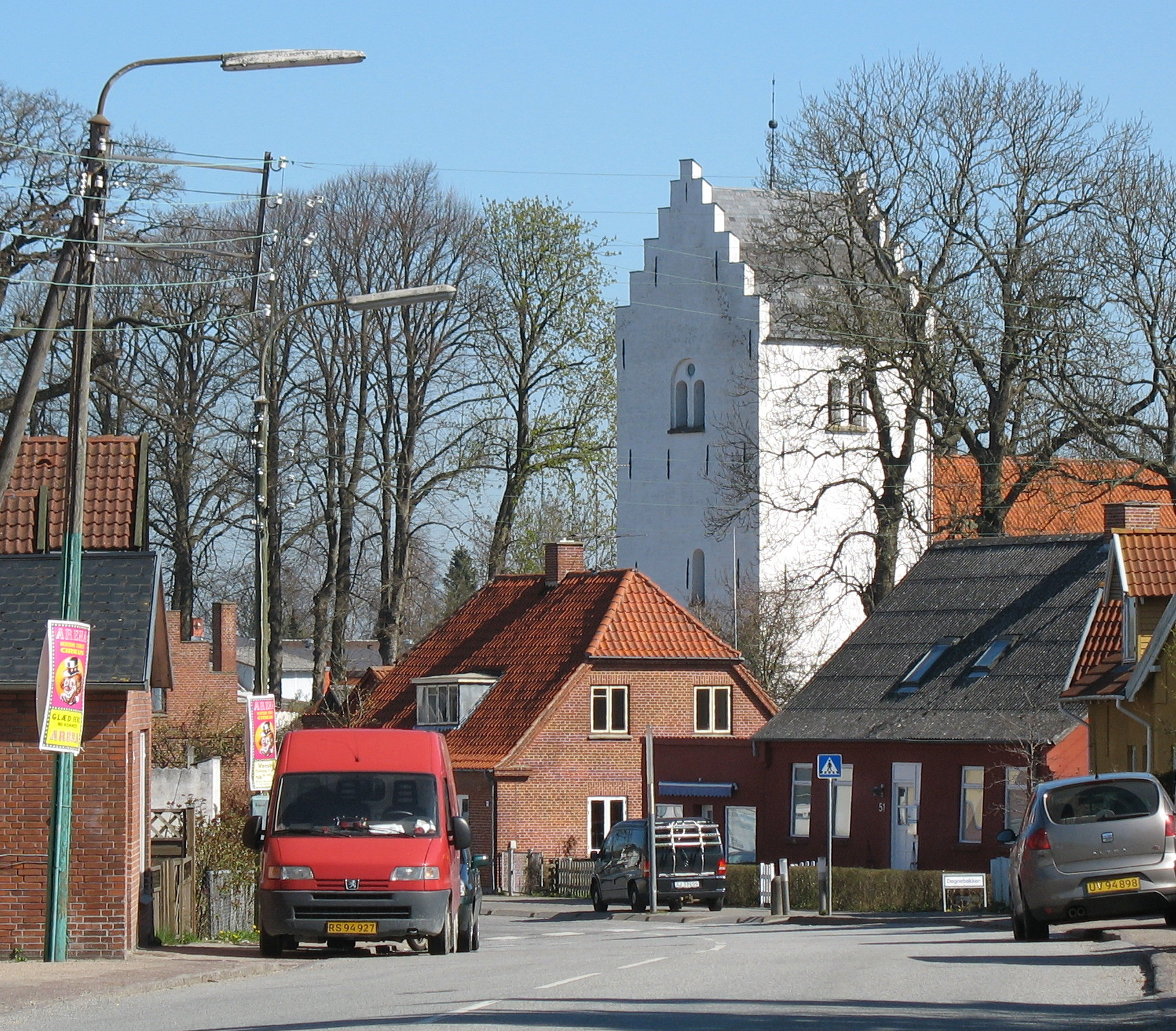

- Location in Denmark Skibby (Capital Region)
- Coordinates: 55°45′11″N 11°57′49″E
- Country: Denmark
- Region: Region Hovedstaden
- Municipality: Frederikssund

Area
  - Urban: 1.84 km^{2} (0.71 sq mi)

Population (2026)
  - Urban: 3,217
  - Urban density: 1,750/km^{2} (4,530/sq mi)
- Time zone: UTC+1 (CET)
  - Summer (DST): UTC+2 (CEST)
- Postal code: DK-4050 Skibby

Skibby is a town with a population of 3,217 (1 January 2026), situated in Frederikssund Municipality, Region Hovedstaden on the northern part of the island of Zealand (Sjælland) in eastern Denmark. It was the municipal seat of the former Skibby Municipality (Danish, Skibby Kommune), until 1 January 2007.

== Skibby Municipality ==
The former Skibby municipality covered an area of 80 km^{2}, and had a total population of 6,783 (2005).

On 1 January 2007 Skibby Municipality ceased to exist as the result of Kommunalreformen ("The Municipality Reform" of 2007). It was merged with Frederikssund, Jægerspris, and Slangerup municipalities to form the new Frederikssund Municipality. This created a municipality with an area of 260 km^{2} and a total population of ca. 44,140.

== Notable people ==
- Hermann Baagøe Storck (1839 in Skibby – 1922 in Copenhagen) a Danish architect and heraldist, known for the restoration of historic buildings. Designed the purpose-built Neoclassical museum building for The Hirschsprung Collection in Copenhagen.
- Sophie Holten (1858 in Skuldelev near Skibby – 1930) a Danish painter who created portraits, flower paintings and genre works, remembered for her portraits of August Strindberg and L. A. Ring
