= Slangerup =

- Town
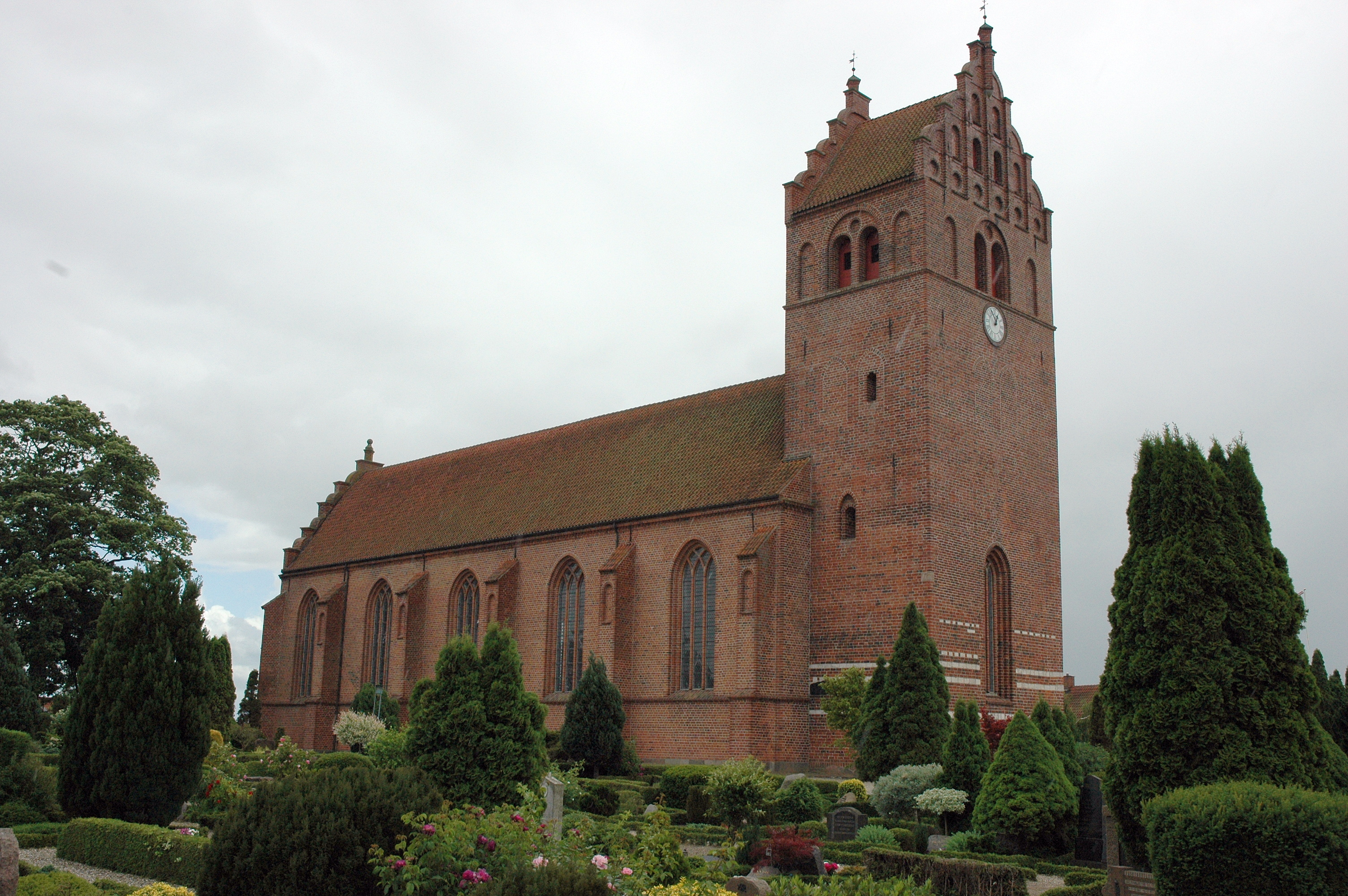
- The church

- Coat of arms

- Location in Denmark Slangerup (Capital Region)
- Coordinates: 55°50′48″N 12°10′34″E
- Country: Denmark
- Region: Capital (Hovedstaden)
- Municipality: Frederikssund
- Established: 10th century

Area
  - Urban: 3.3 km^{2} (1.3 sq mi)

Population (2026)
  - Urban: 6,953
  - Urban density: 2,100/km^{2} (5,500/sq mi)
  - Gender: 3,470 males and 3,483 females
- Time zone: UTC+1 (CET)
  - Summer (DST): UTC+2 (CEST)
- Postal code: DK-3550 Slangerup
- Area code: (+45) 49

Slangerup is a town in Frederikssund Municipality, about 30 km north-west of central Copenhagen, in the Capital Region of Denmark.

== The town of Slangerup ==
The town was established by the Viking Slangir at the time of Harald Bluetooth. King Eric I of Denmark (ca. 1070-July 1103), was born in Slangerup. In the 13th century the town was the scene of activities involving both Bishop Absalon and Valdemar the Great. Thomas Kingo grew up and was priest in the town during the 17th century.

== The municipality of Slangerup ==
Until 1 January 2007, Slangerup was also a municipality covering an area of 46 km² with a total population of 9,237 (2005). Slangerup Municipality ceased as a result of the 2007 Municipal Reform (Kommunalreformen), being merged into Frederikssund municipality along with Jægerspris and Skibby municipalities. This created a municipality with an area of 260 km² and a total population of ca. 44,140.

== Sport ==
Slangerup Speedway Klub is situated on the west side of the town at Hørup Skovvej 5A. They race at the Slangerup Speedway Center.

== Notable people ==
- Eric I of Denmark (ca.1060 in Slangerup – 1103) also known as Eric the Good
- Thomas Kingo (1634 at Slangerup – 1703 in Odense) a Danish bishop, poet and hymn-writer born
- Jesper Hoffmeyer (born 1942 in Slangerup) emeritus professor at the University of Copenhagen Institute of Biology, leading figure in biosemiotics
- Peter Beier (born 1965 in Slangerup) founded the eponymous Danish premium chocolate manufacturing and retailing company in 1996
- Jesper Hansen (born 1985 in Slangerup) a Danish football goalkeeper for Lyngby BK, 340 club caps
