= Frederikssund Municipality =

Frederikssund Municipality Frederikssund Kommune (Danish)
- Municipality
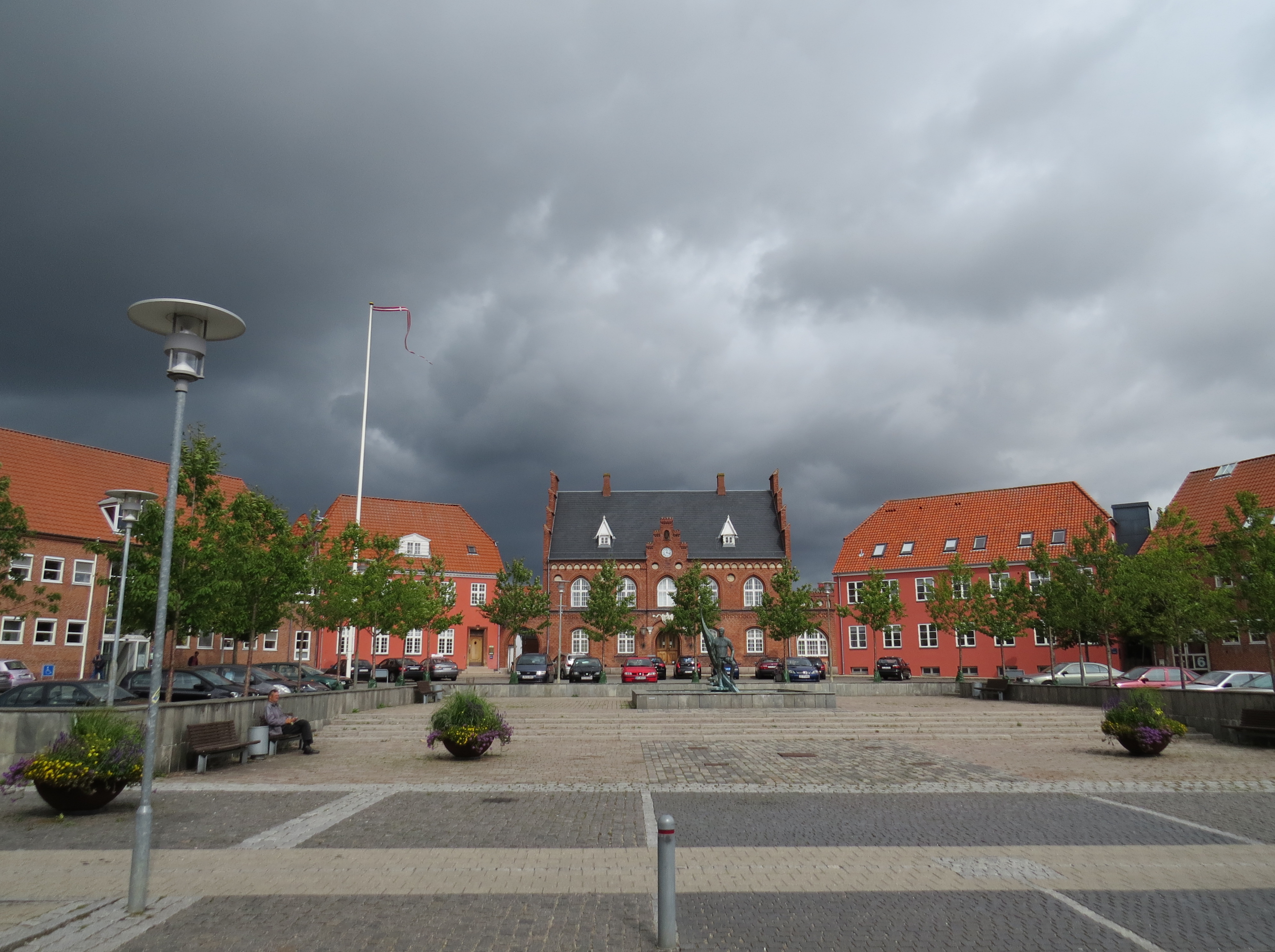

- Flag Coat of arms

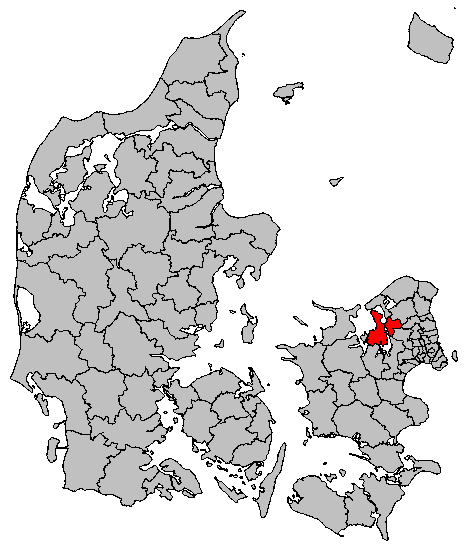
- Coordinates: 55°50′13″N 12°03′55″E
- Country: Denmark
- Region: Hovedstaden
- Established: 1 January 2007
- Seat: Frederikssund

Government
  - Mayor: John Schmidt Andersen (1 January 2014-) (V)

Area
  - Total: 250.61 km^{2} (96.76 sq mi)

Population (1 January 2026)
  - Total: 47,450
  - Density: 189.3/km^{2} (490.4/sq mi)
- Time zone: UTC+1 (CET)
  - Summer (DST): UTC+2 (CEST)
- Municipal code: 250
- Website: www.frederikssund.dk

Frederikssund Kommune (Danish pronunciation: [fʁeðʁek(s)ˈsɔnˀ kʰoˈmuːnə, fʁæðʁæk(s)ˈsɔnˀ -]) is a municipality (Danish: kommune) on the shores of Roskilde Fjord in the northern part of the island of Zealand (Sjælland) in eastern Denmark. On 1 January 2007, the municipality was enlarged to include the old Jægerspris, Slangerup, and Skibby municipalities. It now covers an area of 250 km^{2} and has a population of 47,450 (1 January 2026). As of 1 January 2014 its mayor is John Schmidt Andersen, a member of the agrarian liberal Venstre political party. Frederikssund municipality belongs to Region Hovedstaden (Capital Region).

The seat of its municipal council is the town of Frederikssund with a population of 15,283 (1 January 2009). The town is connected to the Hornsherred peninsula by the Kronprins Frederik bridge. The former municipalities of Jægerspris and Skibby are located on this peninsula.

== Locations ==
The ten largest locations in the municipality are:

Nr (#)	City	Population (2011)
1	Frederikssund	15,468
2	Slangerup	6,822
3	Jægerspris	4,065
4	Skibby	3,185
5	Græse Bakkeby	2,368
6	Kulhuse	912
7	Skuldelev	905
8	Gerlev	783
9	Store Rørbæk	570
10	Over Dråby Strand	442

== Politics ==
=== Municipal council ===
Frederikssund's municipal council consists of 23 members, elected every four years.

Below are the municipal councils elected since the Municipal Reform of 2007.

Election	Party								Total seats	Turnout	Elected mayor
Election	A	B	C	E	F	O	V	Ø	Total seats	Turnout	Elected mayor
2005	13	1	3		1	1	8		27	72.2%	Ole Find Jensen (A)
2009	10		3		3	2	5		23	67.1%	Ole Find Jensen (A)
2013	8		1	1	1	3	8	1	23	73.4%	John S. Andersen (V)
2017	8	1	1		1	2	9	1	23	72.6%	John S. Andersen (V)
Data from Kmdvalg.dk 2005, 2009, 2013 and 2017

== Recent developments ==
The new harbour square provides the finishing touches to the harbour developments which began in the 1990s. There are also ambitious plans to build a new residential development to the south of Frederikssund in Vinge north of Store Rørbæk. Vinge Station on the C line of the S-train was opened 14 December 2020.

== Twin towns – sister cities ==
Frederikssund is twinned with:

- Aurskog-Høland, Norway
- Catoira, Spain
- Kowary, Poland
- Kumla, Sweden
- Ramsgate, England, United Kingdom
- Sipoo, Finland
- Somerset, England, United Kingdom

== Gallery ==
Frederikssund's main pedestrian street

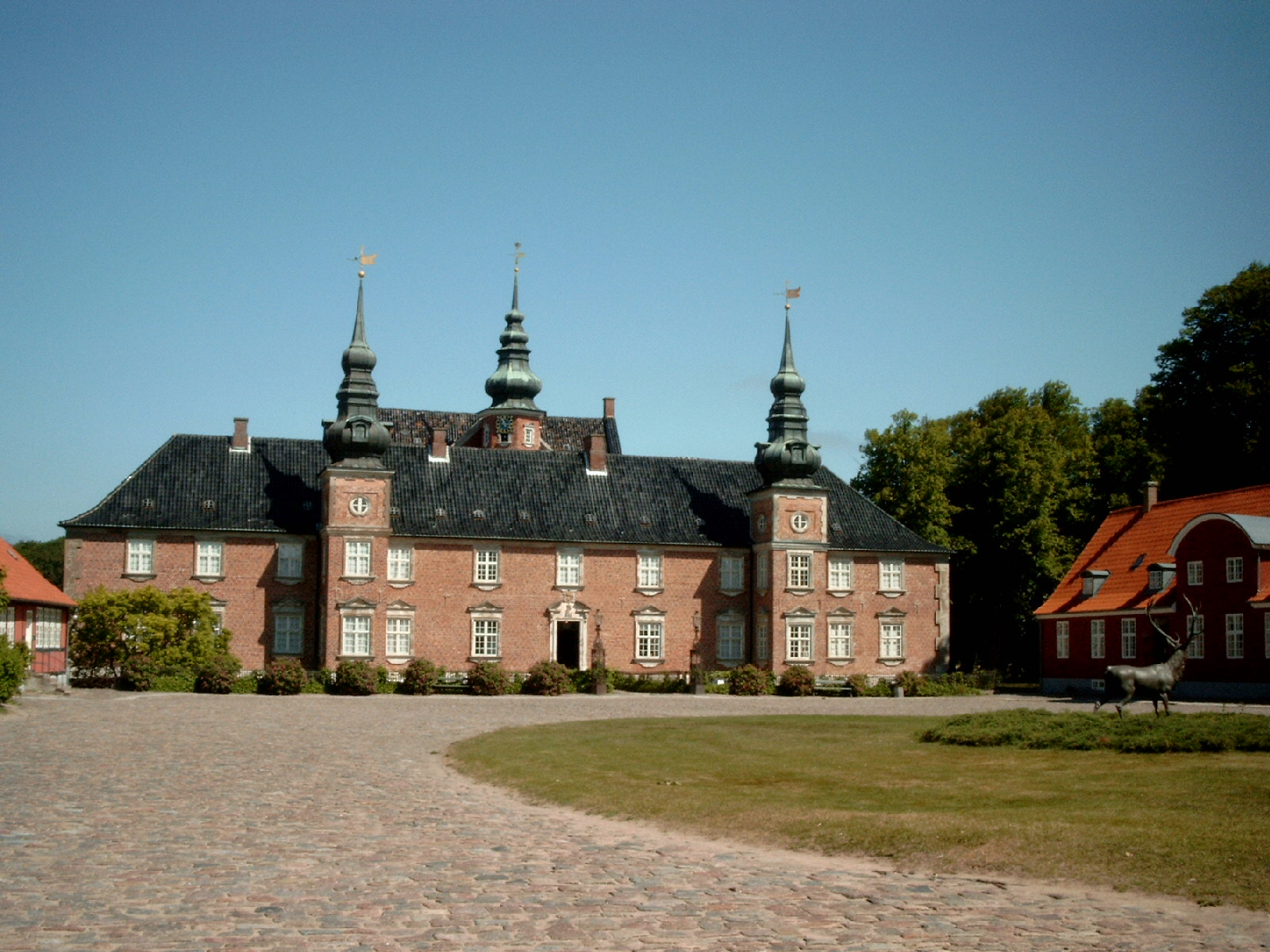
Jægerspris Castle

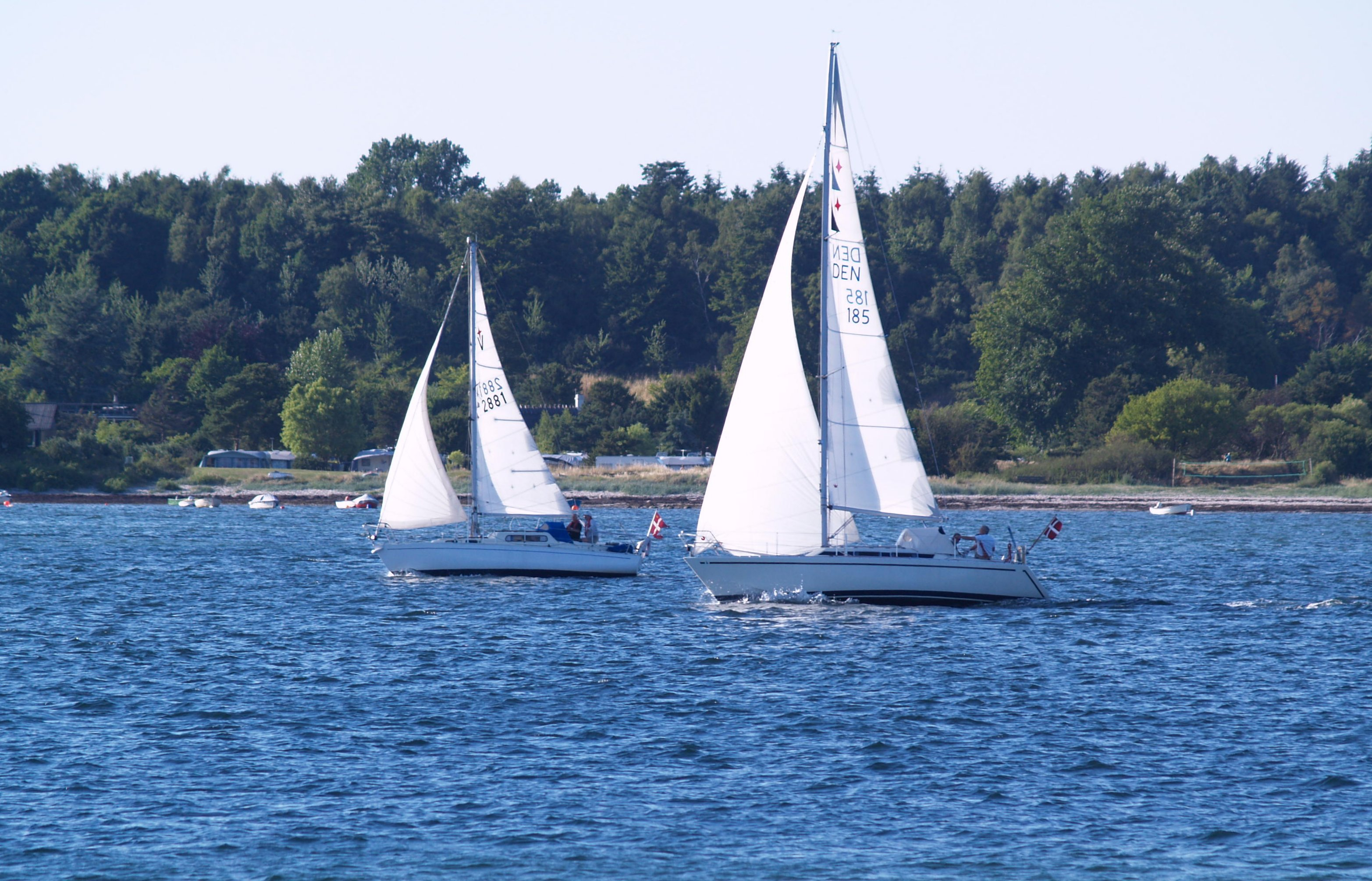
Kulhuse

== See also ==
- Frederikssund railway station
