= Jægerspris =

- town
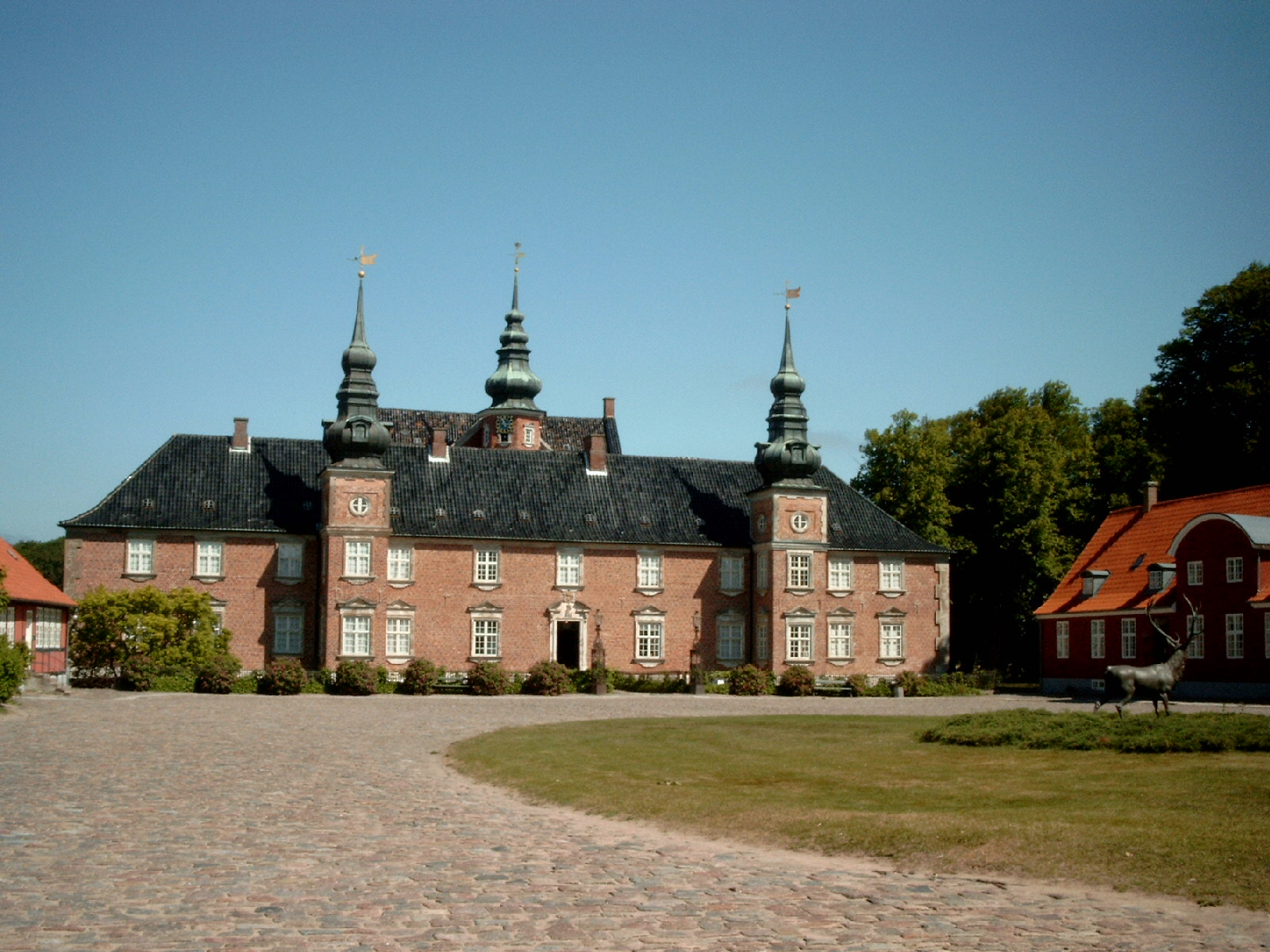
- Jægerspris castle

- Location within Denmark Location within Capital Region
- Coordinates: 55°51′08″N 11°59′31″E
- Country: Denmark
- Region: Region Hovedstaden
- Municipality: Frederikssund

Area
  - Urban: 2.6 km^{2} (1.0 sq mi)

Population (2026)
  - Urban: 4,131
  - Urban density: 1,600/km^{2} (4,100/sq mi)
  - Gender: 2,040 males and 2,091 females
- Time zone: UTC+1 (CET)
  - Summer (DST): UTC+2 (CEST)
- Postal code: DK-3630 Jægerspris

Jægerspris is a town, with a population of 4,131 (1 January 2026), in eastern Denmark. It is situated in Region Hovedstaden, 6 km northwest of Frederikssund, on the northern part of the island of Zealand (Sjælland).

The town was established ca. 1870 around Jægerspris Castle, which is surrounded by kilometres of hiking and biking trails in the Jægerspris forest.

It was the municipal seat of the former Jægerspris Municipality (Danish, Kommune), until 1 January 2007.

== Attractions ==
The "Høegh-Guldbergs nationalhistoriske anlæg" ("Høegh-Guldbergs National Historical Garden") on the grounds of the castle commemorate the lives of exceptional Danish citizens with monuments designed in the 1770s by Johannes Wiedewelt, one of Denmark's most important sculptors. The area also has ancient, archeological burial sites.

Another attraction is a windmill which was first constructed ca. 1615, in the times of King Christian IV. The current windmill is from 1854. The area boasts churches with typical Danish frescos.

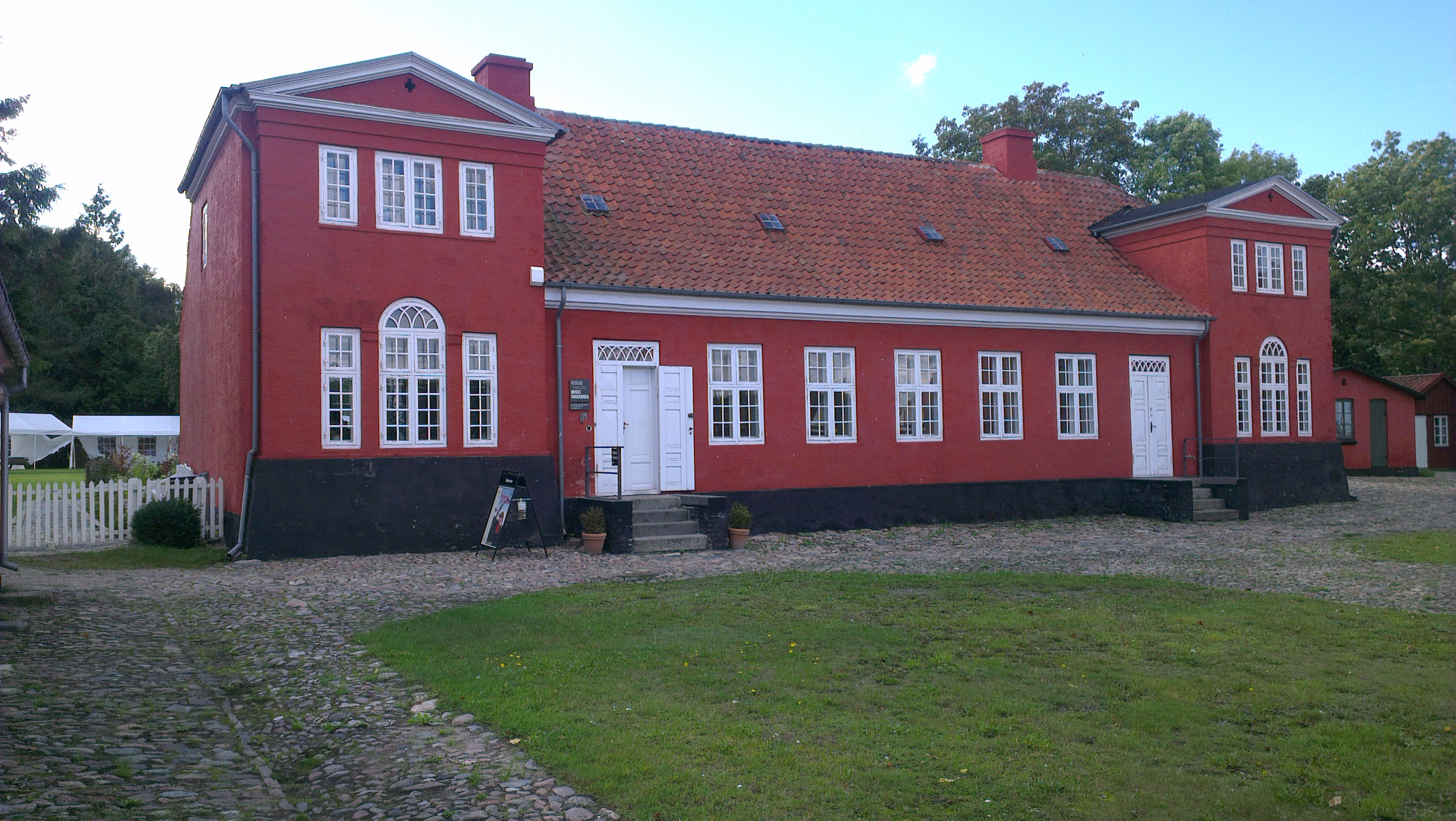
The local museum Færgegården

The local museum (Egnsmuseum) in Færgegården includes Crown Prince Frederik VIII's bridge, which was erected in 1868.

There are also a couple of beaches within walking distance of the town.

== Jægerspris Municipality ==
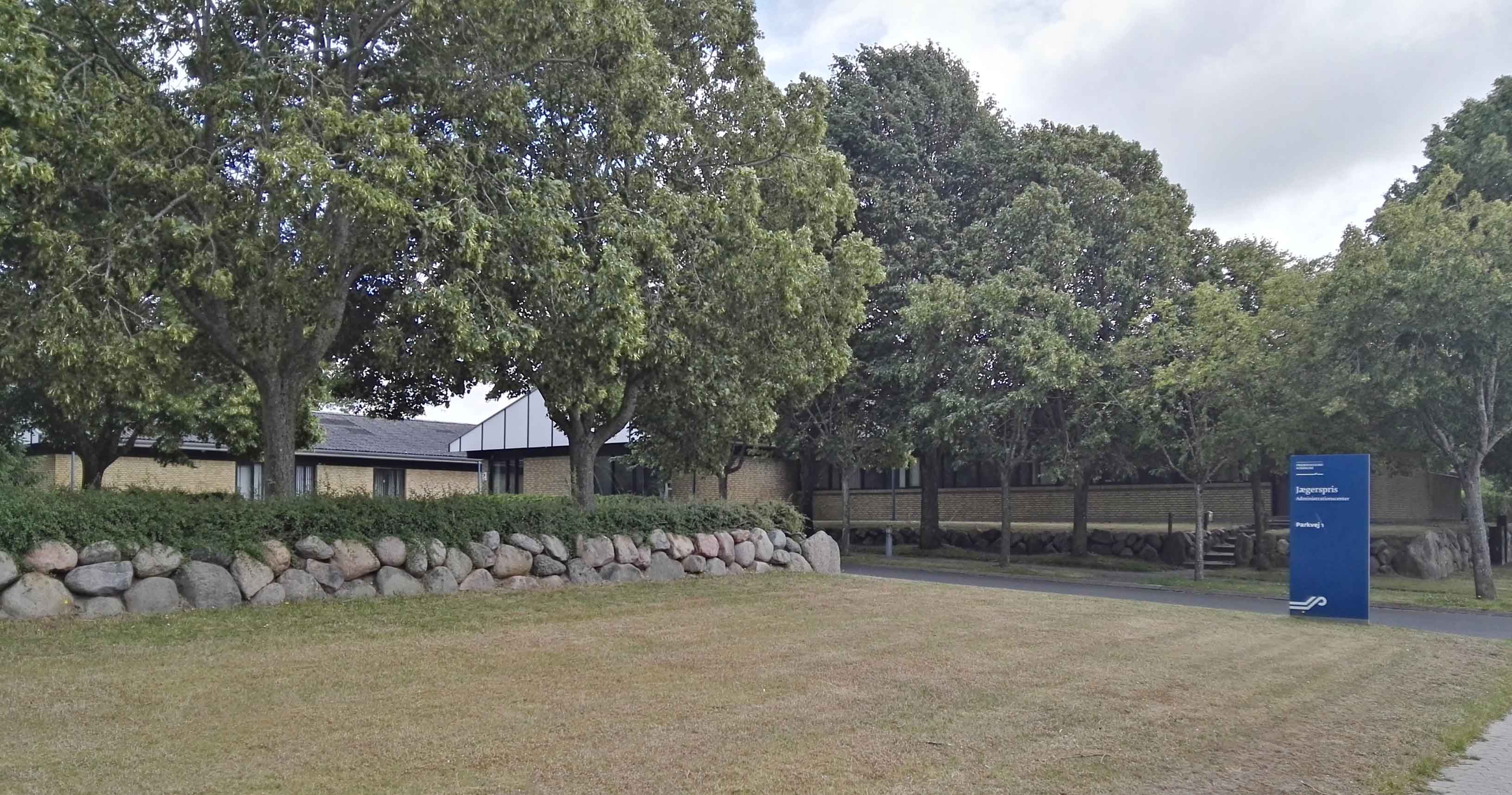
The former townhall of Jægerspris Municipality

The former Jægerspris Municipality covered an area of 96 km^{2}, and had a total population of 9,480 (2005). Its last mayor was Ole Find, a member of the Social Democrats (Socialdemokraterne) political party.

A significant portion of the north end of Jægerspris is covered by forest. There are also stretches of sand and dunes along the municipality's western side.

In addition to roadways leading southward into Skibby, there is a road across Roskilde Fjord to the town of Frederikssund. A ferry to Hundested from Kulhuse to Sølager was disbanded in recent years. As of 2006, the ferry has been reinserted and sails in the summer months.

On 1 January 2007 Jægerspris Municipality ceased to exist due to Kommunalreformen ("The Municipality Reform" of 2007). It was combined with existing Frederikssund, Slangerup, and Skibby municipalities to form the new Frederikssund Municipality.

== Notable people ==
- Johannes Schmidt (1877–1933) a Danish biologist credited with discovering in 1920 that European eels migrate to the Sargasso Sea to spawn
- Jørgen Læssøe (1924–1993), Assyriologist and professor at the University of Copenhagen
- Jacob Berthelsen (born 1986) a retired Danish professional football player with over 170 club caps
- Nicolai Sylvest (born 1997), a Danish racing driver
