= Frederikssund =

- Town
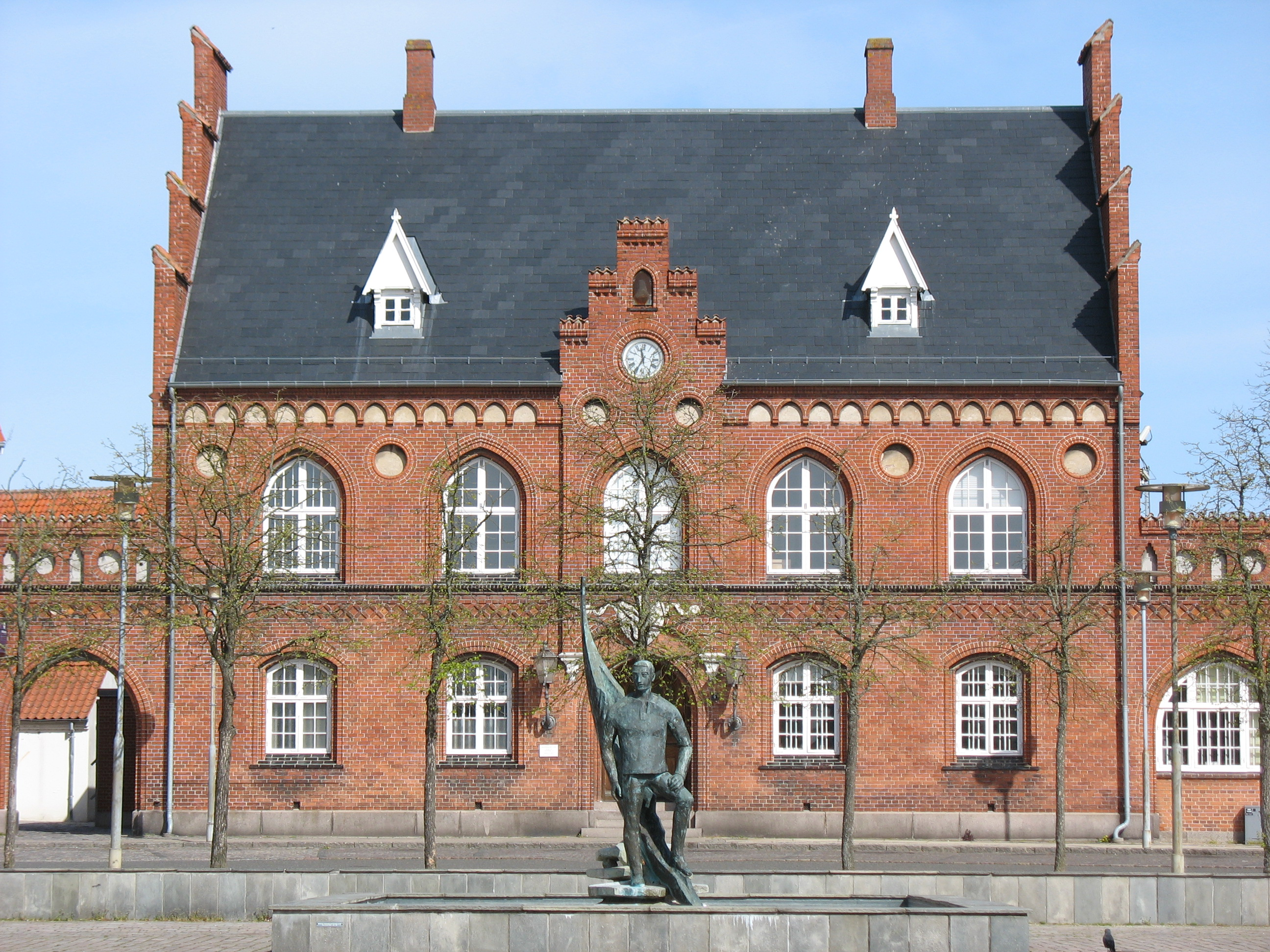
- Town hall

- Coat of arms

- Location in Denmark Frederikssund (Capital Region)
- Coordinates: 55.83330°N 12.06659°E
- Country: Denmark
- Region: Capital (Hovedstaden)
- Municipality: Frederikssund

Government
  - Mayor: John Schmidt Andersen

Area
  - Urban: 8.2 km^{2} (3.2 sq mi)

Population (2026)
  - Urban: 17,639
  - Urban density: 2,200/km^{2} (5,600/sq mi)
  - Gender: 8,597 males and 9,042 females
- Demonym: Frederikssunder
- Time zone: UTC+1 (Central Europe Time)
  - Summer (DST): UTC+2
- Website: frederikssund.dk

Frederikssund (Danish pronunciation: [fʁeðʁek(s)ˈsɔnˀ, fʁæðʁæk(s)ˈsɔnˀ]) is a Danish town, seat of the Frederikssund Municipality, in the Region Hovedstaden with a population of 17,639 (1 January 2026). It received the status of market town in 1810. The town is famous for its annual Viking Games as well as for the J.F. Willumsen museum. Since 1935, it has been connected to Hornsherred via the Kronprins Frederik Bridge.

== History ==
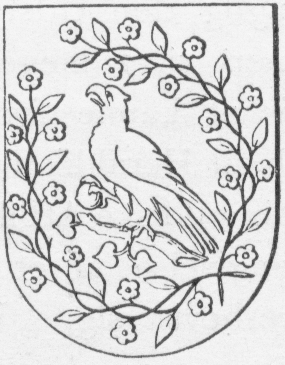
Historical coat of arms

There is evidence of communities dating right back to the Stone Age with a number of burial sites in the area. It seems probable that there was a small settlement at the present location of Frederikssund in the Middle Ages but the development of the town probably began in the 12th century with the construction of a church at what was then known as Ude Sundby or Sundby Færge (Sundby Ferry). Located at a narrow point on Roskilde Fjord, Sundby Færge became the harbour for the nearby market town of Slangerup.

In 1809–10, the status of market town was transferred from Slangerup to Frederikssund, named after King Frederik III. In 1868, a pontoon bridge linking Frederikssund to Hornsherred was opened. This was replaced by today's Kronprins Frederik Bridge in 1935.

Frederikssund's rapid expansion from a small town at the end of the 19th century is due in large part to the railway connection with Ballerup in 1879 which was upgraded to a frequent suburban service to Copenhagen in 1989.

Frederikssund was also attacked under World War II, as Kalvø was attacked by the germans in 1940.

== Geography ==
Frederikssund is located on the east coast of Roskilde Fjord, about 45 km north-west of Copenhagen, 20 km south of Hillerød and 30 km north of Roskilde. It is less than an hour from Copenhagen by either road or rail. S-trains (suburban commuter trains) leave about once every 10 minutes. Copenhagen Airport can be reached by road or rail in about an hour.

The low hills on which Frederikssund lies are formed of moraines from the last ice age. The shallow Roskilde Fjord which separates Frederikssund from Hornsherred originated in the same period.

The fertile land surrounding Frederikssund is used for mixed farming - with an emphasis on cereals, root crops and pigs.

== Frederikssund today ==
The recent development of the town center and the old commercial harbour have given Frederikssund a new look which reflects its growing popularity as a residential area with connections to Copenhagen and surroundings. It has all the facilities associated with a modern Danish town: museums, a public library, supermarkets, a hospital and sports and recreation centers. With a location facing west over the Roskilde Fjord, it has many footpaths along the shores and up into the higher ground to the east. The local rail and bus services are well developed.

=== Culture ===
Cultural attractions include the J.F. Willumsens Museum, the Færgegården local history museum at the far end of the bridge over to Hornsherred, and the annual Viking plays held in a large outdoor theatre in the summer.

=== Leisure activities ===
Activities range from sailing, rowing, cycling, golfing or gliding to simply sitting out on the main pedestrian street (gågade).

=== Sports ===
There are several sports clubs and facilities in Frederikssund covering soccer, American football, swimming, basketball, bowling and cycling.

== Notable people ==
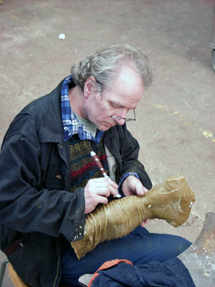
Jens Galschiot, 2009

- Albert Jensen (1847–1913), architect
- Eugen Jørgensen (1858–1910), architect and local politician
- Georg Achen (1860–1912), naturalist painter of portraits
- Oluf Pedersen (1891–1970), politician and member of the Folketing 1932–45 and 1950–60
- Povl Søndergaard (1905–1986) sculptor of lifelike busts and female figures, died here
- Peter Alsing Nielsen (1907–1985), painter
- Regin Prenter (1907–1990), Lutheran priest, theologian and parish priest of Branderup
- Jette Thyssen (born 1933), textile artist, painter and lithographer
- Annie Birgit Garde (born 1933), actress
- Grethe Ingmann (1938–1990), singer, died here
- Anne Dorte of Rosenborg (1947–2014), countess and wife of Count Christian of Rosenborg
- Jens Galschiøt (born 1954), sculptor
- Morten Messerschmidt (born 1980), politician and MEP

=== Sport ===
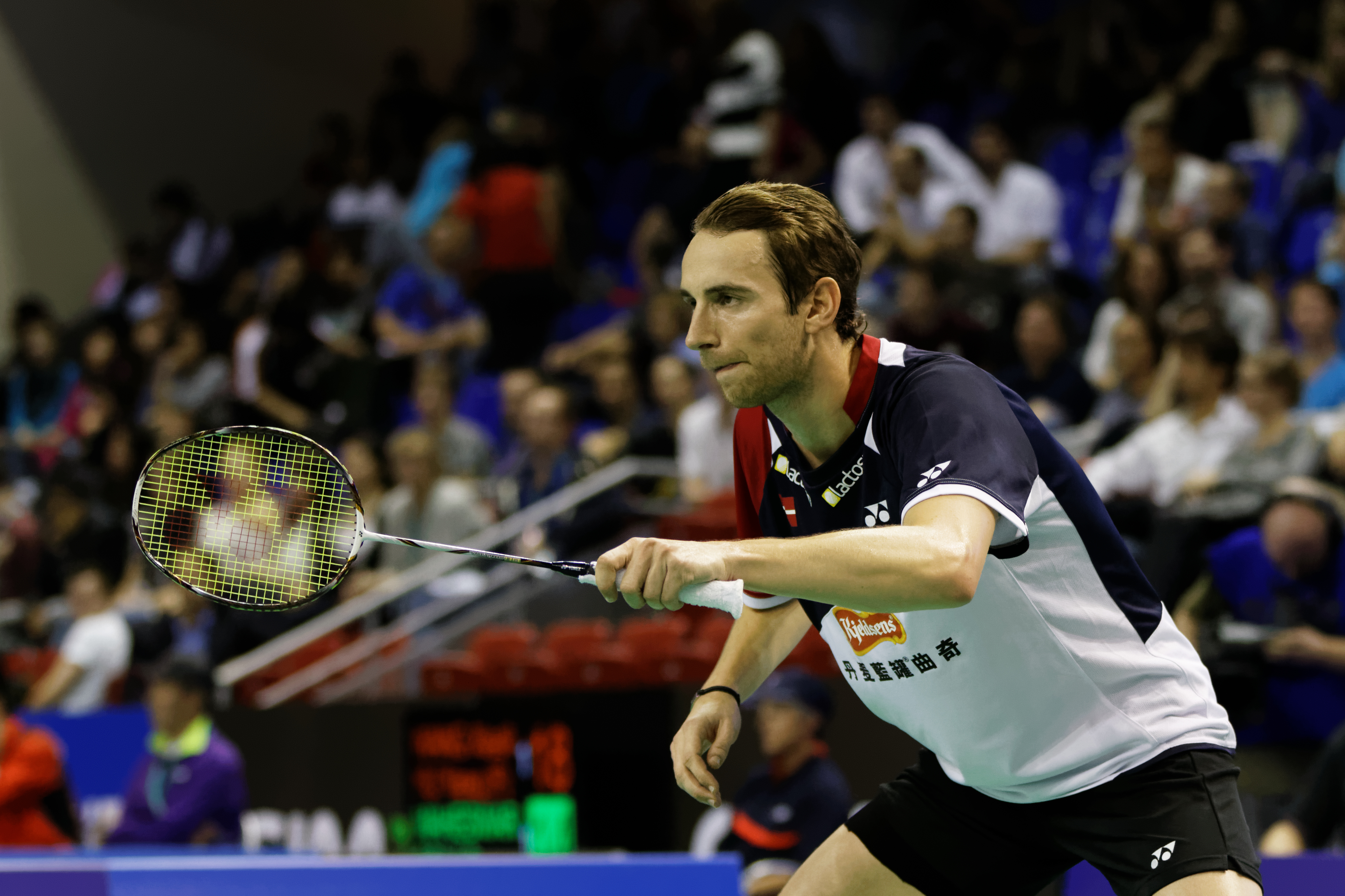
Mathias Boe, 2013

- Vilhelm Johansen (1898–1993), sports shooter
- Morian Hansen (1905–1995), motorcycle speedway rider & RAF squadron leader
- Kresten Bjerre (1946–2014), footballer, died here
- Martin Haldbo Hansen (born 1969), rower
- Anders Kristiansen (born 1979), badminton player
- Mathias Boe (born 1980), badminton player, Olympic medalist
- Mie Skov (born 1986), table tennis player

== Twin towns - sister cities ==
Frederikssund practices twinning on the municipal level. For the twin towns, see twin towns of Frederikssund Municipality.

== See also ==
- Frederikssund station
- Frederikssundbanen
- Motorways in Denmark
