= Charlottenlund railway station =

Commuter railway station in Greater Copenhagen, Denmark

Charlottenlund
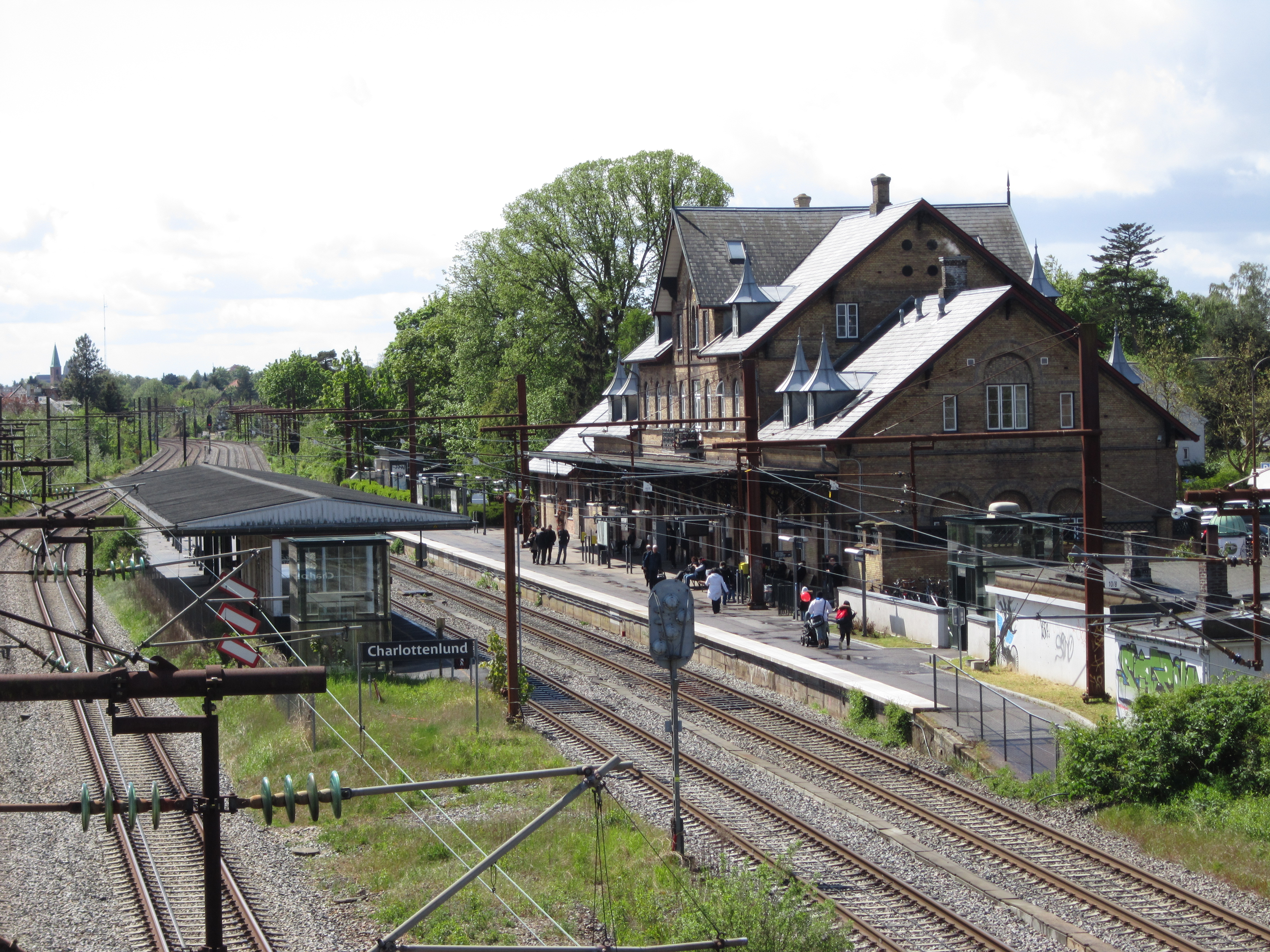
- Charlottenlund station in 2012

General information
- Location: Stationspladsen 2; 2920 Charlottenlund; Gentofte Municipality; Denmark
- Coordinates: 55°45′07″N 12°34′21″E
- Elevation: 9.0 metres (29.5 ft)
- Owner: DSB (station infrastructure); Banedanmark (rail infrastructure)
- Lines: Klampenborg Line
- Platforms: 1 side platform 1 island platform
- Tracks: 4
- Train operators: DSB

Construction
- Structure type: At-grade
- Cycle facilities: Bicycle parking station
- Accessible: Yes
- Architect: Vilhelm Carl Heinrich Wolf (1863); Thomas Arboe (1899)

Other information
- Station code: Ch
- Website: Official website

History
- Opened: 22 July 1863; 163 years ago
- Rebuilt: 1899
- Electrified: 15 May 1934 (S-train); 1986 (Main line)

Services
Preceding station	S-train	Following station
Ordrup towards Klampenborg	C	Hellerup towards Frederikssund
Location

Charlottenlund station is a suburban rail and former main line railway station serving the suburb of Charlottenlund north of Copenhagen, Denmark, as well as the nearby Charlottenlund Beach Park and the Charlottenlund Racetrack. The station is located in the central part of the suburb where its main artery Jægersborg Allé crosses the railway line.

Charlottenlund station is located on the Klampenborg radial of Copenhagen's S-train network, a hybrid commuter rail and rapid transit system serving Greater Copenhagen. It is served regularly by trains on the C-line which have a journey time to central Copenhagen of around 15 minutes. The station opened in 1863 with the opening of the Klampenborg Line between Copenhagen and Klampenborg, and has been served by the S-train network since 1934. Its second and current station building was built in 1898 to designs by the Danish architect Thomas Arboe (1836–1917).

== History ==
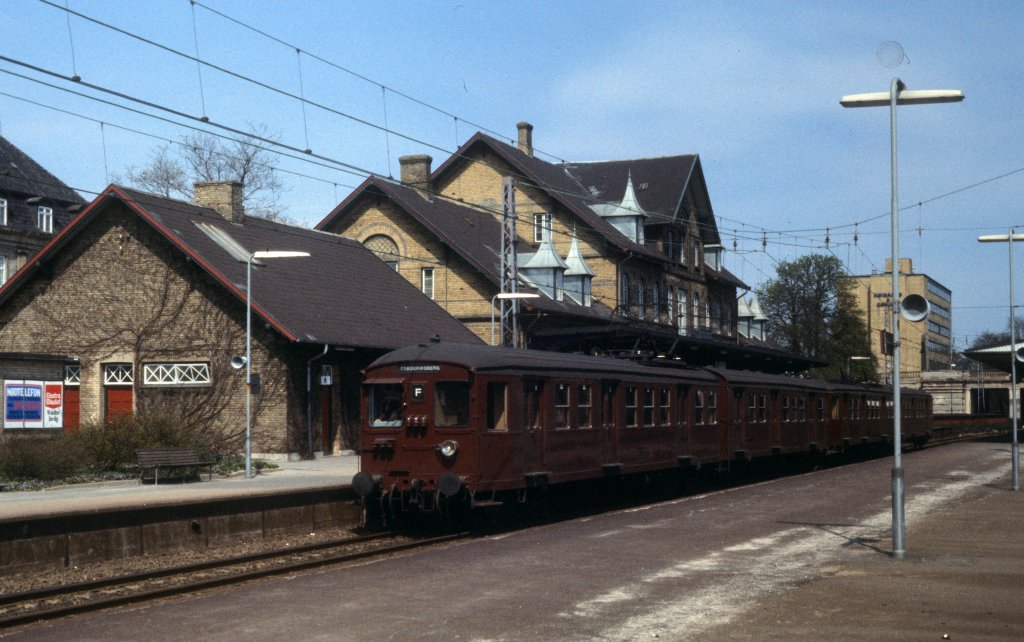
1st generation S-train at Charlottenlund in 1978.

Charlottenlund Station opened on 22 July 1863 as the privately owned Det Sjællandske Jernbaneselskab (English: the Zealand Railway Company) opened the Klampenborg Line which connected Copenhagen with Klampenborg as a branch line of the North Line between Copenhagen and Elsinore via Hillerød. It opened where the railway line crossed the road Jægersborg Allé and was named after the nearby Charlottenlund Palace. On 1 January 1880, the railway station was taken over by the Danish state along with the Zealand Railway Company. And on 1 October 1885, it became part of the new national railway company, the Danish State Railways.

When the station opened, most travelers were excursionists from the city who visited the forest, beach and the popular beer gardens close to the station. Some of the many excursionists could become intoxicated, and for a period the station had its own drunk tank, where drunks could cool off before boarding the train.

The railway line proved a great success, and traffic quickly became busy enough to expand the originally single-track railway line to double-track which was put into use on 1 April 1877. In 1897, the Klampenborg Line between Hellerup and Klampenborg became part of the Coast Line (Danish: Kystbanen), a more direct railway line between Copenhagen and Elsinore along the coast of the Øresund strait. As part of the construction of the Coast Line, the old smaller station building at Charlottenlund was demolished, and the current one with larger capacity was built on the same site.

Already in the late 1860s, the first few commuters began to take the train to Copenhagen.

In the 1920s, congestion began to occur on the tracks, and it became too difficult to have local trains to Klampenborg and regional trains to Helsingør on the same two tracks. In 1919, construction therefore began of another double track on the section between Hellerup and Klampenborg, which was put into use on 15 May 1928. Just a few years later, the station was among the first served by the S-train, as service began on the 3 of April 1934 when the line Frederiksberg-Vanløse-Hellerup-Klampenborg was opened.

== Architecture ==
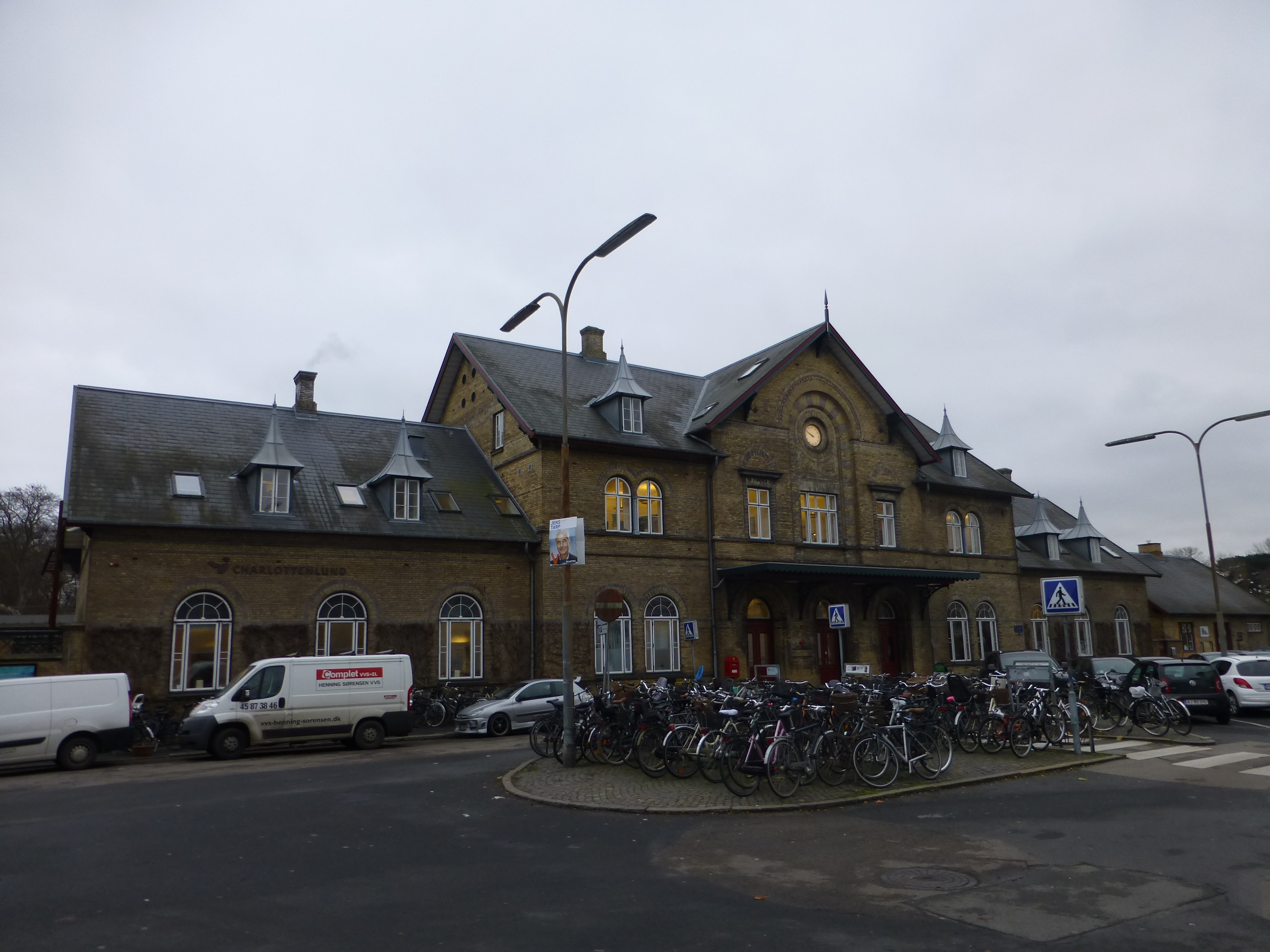
Street facade of the station building in 2013.

Like the other station buildings on the North and Klampenborg Lines, Charlottenlund station's original station building from 1863 was built to designs by the Danish architect Vilhelm Carl Heinrich Wolf (1833–1893). It was located at the site of the current station building and was a modest 1½ storey yellow brick building, with roughly the same size and appearance as the original station building at Klampenborg.

Charlottenlund station's second and current station building was built in 1898 and opened in 1899. It was built to designs by the Danish architect Thomas Arboe (1836–1917), known for the numerous railway stations he designed across Denmark in his capacity of head architect of the Danish State Railways. The building consists of a large central building with a height of 2½ storeys with a prominent transverse entrance section in the middle. The main building is flanked by two lower side buildings with a height of 1½ storeys. The building appears with Arboe's preferred brick facades, and demonstrates the modern practicality of the time, where the decoration is largely limited to modest brickwork patterns that reveal interest in the materiality of the brickwork.

== Facilities ==
The station has a bicycle parking station as well as a car park with approximately 93 parking spaces.

The station building itself now houses a private office hotel. In one of the side buildings is a bakery with a café. The former ticket sales building on the eastern side of the tracks has been renovated as a private meeting and banqueting facility.

== Operations ==
Charlottenlund station is served regularly by trains on the C-line of Copenhagen's S-train network which run between Klampenborg and Frederikssund via central Copenhagen and Ballerup.

== See also ==
- List of Copenhagen S-train stations
- List of railway stations in Denmark
- Rail transport in Denmark
- History of rail transport in Denmark
- Transportation in Copenhagen
- Transportation in Denmark
- Danish State Railways
- Banedanmark
