= Klampenborgbanen =

Railway line in Greater Copenhagen, Denmark

Klampenborg Line

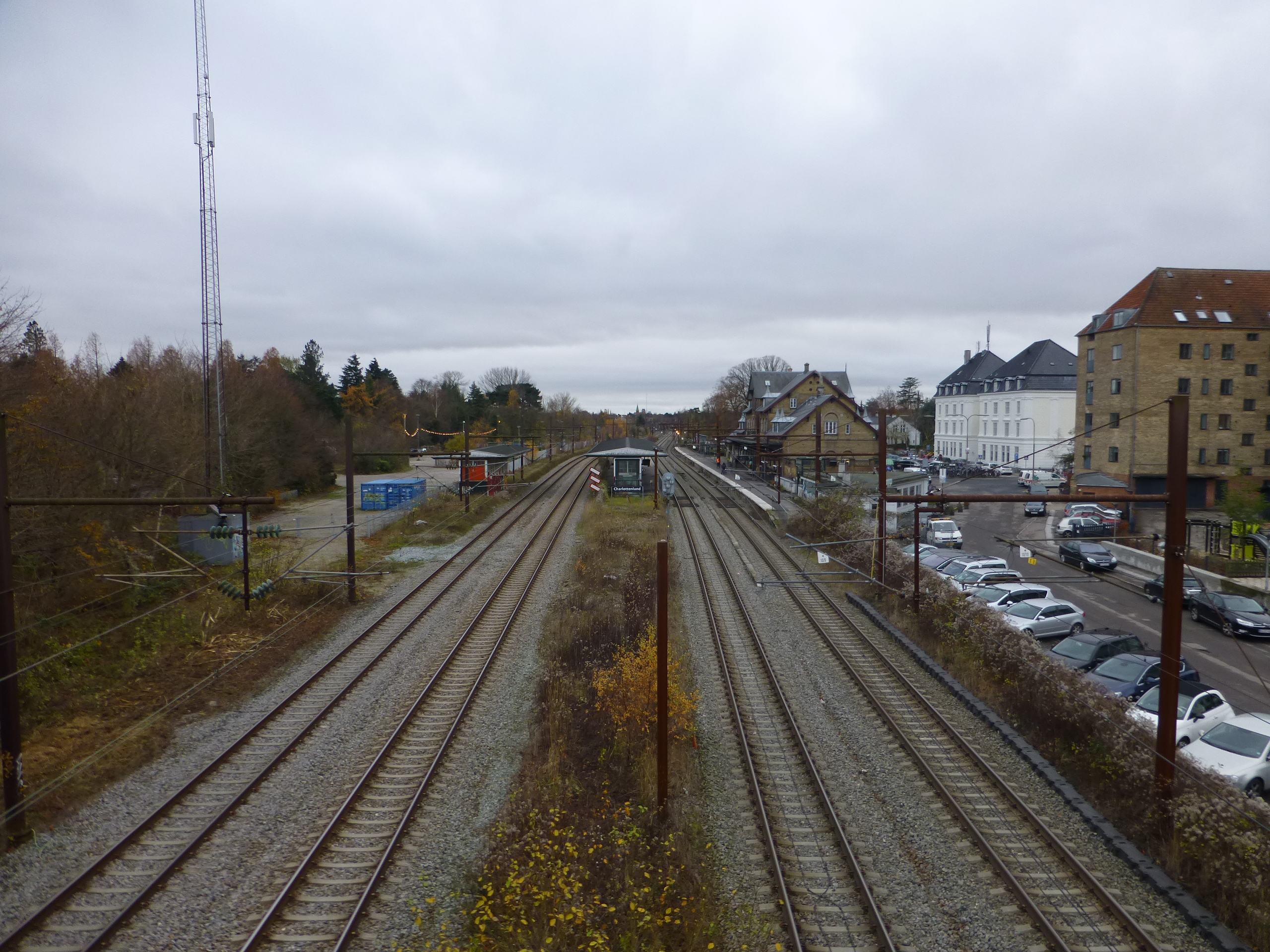
- The Klampenborg Line at Charlottenlund in 2013

Overview
- Native name: Klampenborgbanen
- Owner: Banedanmark
- Line number: 860
- Locale: Greater Copenhagen
- Termini: Hellerup; Klampenborg
- Stations: 4
- Website: https://bane.dk

Service
- Type: Suburban rail
- System: Copenhagen S-train
- Operator(s): DSB
- Rolling stock: 4th generation S-train

History
- Opened: 22 July 1863
- Doubled: 1 April 1877
- Quadrupled: 15 May 1928
- Electrified: 3 April 1934

Technical
- Line length: 5.5 km (3.4 mi)
- Number of tracks: 2
- Character: Grade-separated
- Track gauge: 1,435 mm (4 ft 8 1/2 in) standard gauge
- Electrification: 1,650 V DC overhead line
- Operating speed: 100 km/h (62 mph)
- Signalling: CBTC
Route map
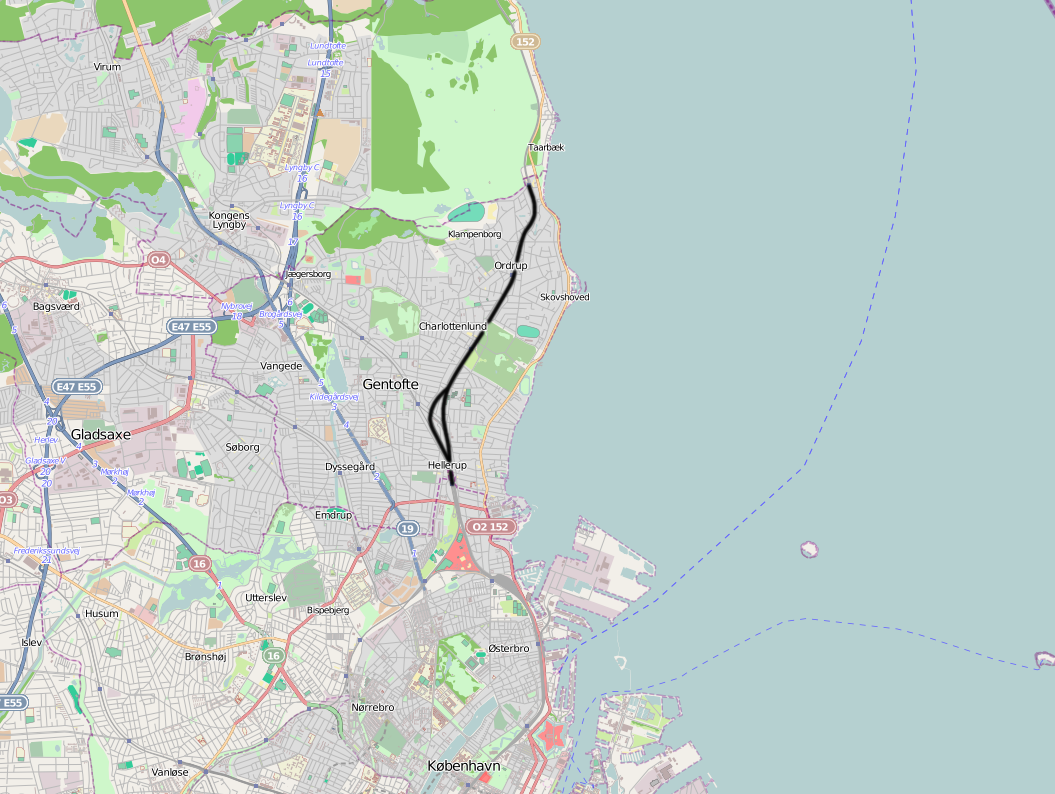
Map of the Klampenborg Line between Hellerup and Klampenborg

The Klampenborg Line (Danish: Klampenborgbanen) is a railway line between Copenhagen and Klampenborg in the northern suburbs of Copenhagen, Denmark. It is the shortest (13.3 km from København H) of the six radial lines of Copenhagen's S-train network, a hybrid commuter rail and rapid transit system serving Greater Copenhagen.

The line runs parallel to the Coast Line regional line from central Copenhagen until Klampenborg, and serves residential neighbourhoods in the eastern part of Gentofte Municipality as well as popular recreational destinations at Klampenborg such as the Dyrehavsbakken amusement park, the Jægersborg Dyrehave forest park or the Bellevue Beach.

== History ==
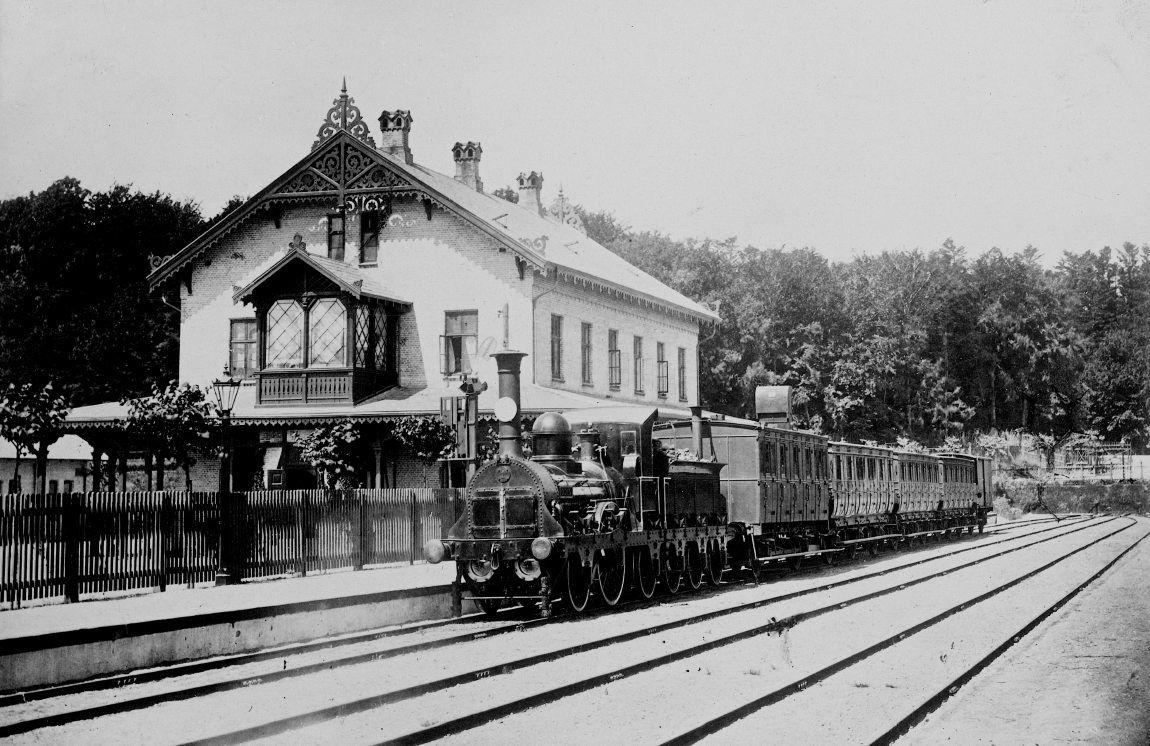
Klampenborg Station in 1868.

On 19 February 1861, the Danish Parliament passed a construction act, which on 14 December 1861 led to the Zealand Railway Company being granted a concession to build a railway line, the North Line (Danish: Nordbanen), from Copenhagen to Elsinore via Hillerød with a branch line from Hellerup to Klampenborg. The Klampenborg Line opened in 1863, and was completed several months ahead of the main line, because the private railway company wanted to profit as much as possible from the summer season of 1863. The line was primarily a "picnic railway"; its terminus at Klampenborg was close to the attractions such as Dyrehavsbakken amusement park, the Jægersborg Dyrehave forest park and the Bellevue Beach. The expectations were met: the railway was an immense success from day one.

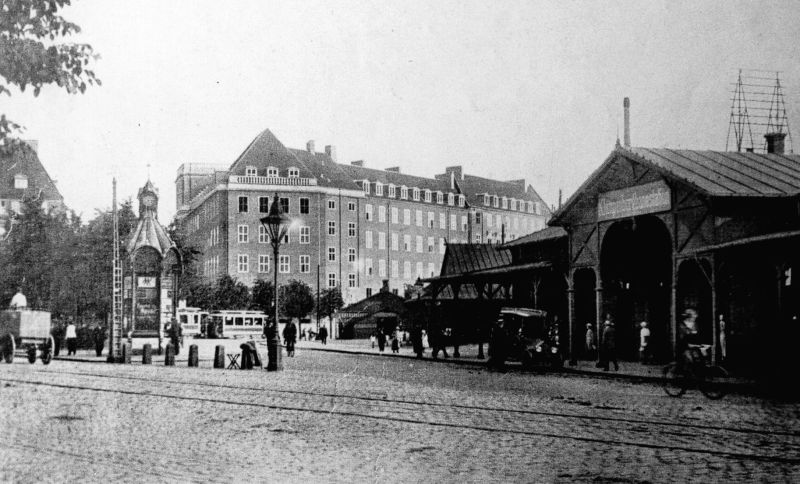
The 2nd Klampenborg Station in central Copenhagen, c. 1900.

Trains on the Klampenborg Line departed from a separate station in Copenhagen, called the Klampenborg Station, located immediately north Copenhagen Central Station. In 1887, a new separate station called opened for the Klampenborg Line, and the name of the old Klampenborg station was changed to the North station. From there, the trains used the tracks of the North Line to reach Hellerup. The original route south of Hellerup was different from the current one; see Nordbanen for details. At Hellerup, the Klampenborg Line branched of from the North Line and continued north along the coast of the Øresund strait. The line originally had only one intermediate station, Charlottenlund, which served the suburb of Charlottenlund, as well as the nearby Charlottenlund Palace.

In 1897, the Klampenborg Line between Hellerup and Klampenborg became part of the Coast Line (Danish: Kystbanen) from Copenhagen to Elsinore. Over the years it became difficult to run both the local trains to Klampenborg and the Elsinore trains on the same two tracks, and a dedicated local double track from Hellerup to Klampenborg was built in 1928. Already in 1924, an additional intermediate station, Ordrup, was opened to serve the growing suburb of Ordrup.

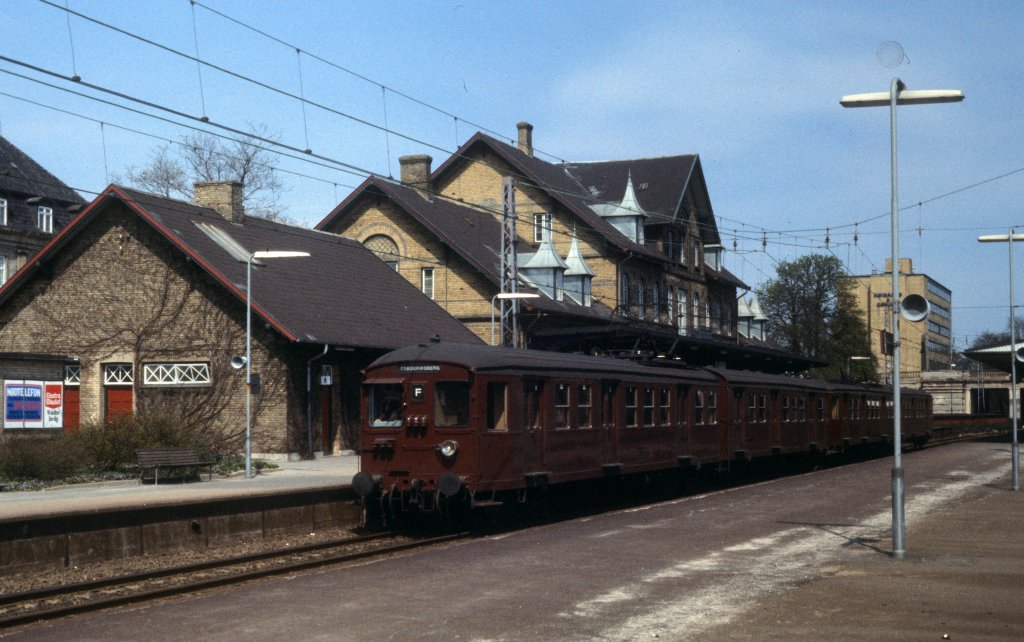
1st generation S-train at Charlottenlund in 1978.

Because of the large outing traffic (as late as 1950 Sundays were far busier than weekdays on the Klampenborg Line), the Klampenborg Line was a natural first choice when the decision to electrify the local rail traffic around Copenhagen was taken, and the first S-trains ran on the line in 1934. Since then little has changed. As much of the population has moved out from the city center the Sunday traffic has become less important, but at the same time the line has gained a modest commuter patronage on weekdays.

== Stations ==
Name	Services	Opened	S-trains	Comments
København H	C	30 November 1911	15 May 1934	Central station; also all other radials; bus terminal; cross-link express bus 250S
Vesterport	C	15 May 1934		Also all other radials
Nørreport	C	1 July 1918	15 May 1934	Also all other radials; transfer to metro; bus terminal; cross-link express buses 150S and 350S
Østerport	C	2 August 1897	15 May 1934	Also all other radials; named Østerbro until 1934
Nordhavn	C	15 May 1934		Also Farum and Hillerød radials
Svanemøllen	C	15 May 1934		Also Farum and Hillerød radials
Hellerup	C	22 July 1863	4 March 1934	Also Hillerød radial; transfer to ring line; bus terminal
Charlottenlund	C	22 July 1863	4 March 1934	
Ordrup	C	1 July 1924	4 March 1934	
Klampenborg	C	22 July 1863	4 March 1934	

== Service patterns ==
The Klampenborg radial is served by trains on service C, which stop at all stations.

Before 1979 the main service to Klampenborg was service A. Historically, service on the Klampenborg radial has often been reinforced in busy periods by ring line trains continuing northwards from Hellerup. This practice has been abandoned (so far) with the 2007 timetable; instead the frequency of the main C service is doubled most of the day.

== See also ==
- List of Copenhagen S-train lines
- Transportation in Copenhagen
- List of railway lines in Denmark
- Rail transport in Denmark
- Transportation in Denmark
- History of rail transport in Denmark
- S-train (Copenhagen)
- Banedanmark
