= Ordrup railway station =

Commuter railway station in Greater Copenhagen, Denmark

Ordrup
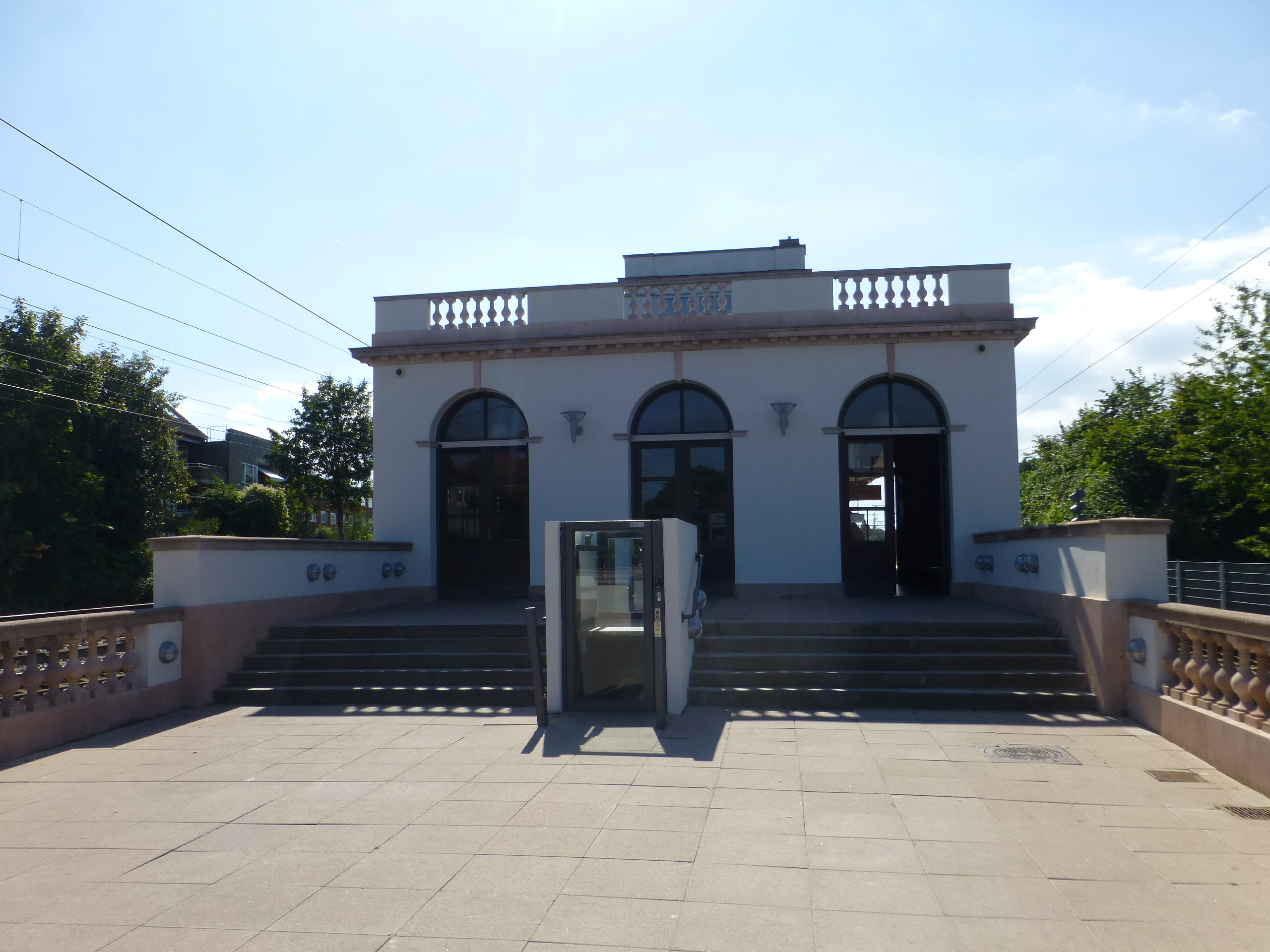
- Ordrup station in 2014

General information
- Location: Schioldannsvej 21; Ordrup, 2920 Charlottenlund; Gentofte Municipality; Denmark
- Coordinates: 55°45′47″N 12°35′01″E
- Elevation: 9.6 metres (31 ft)
- Owner: DSB (station infrastructure); Banedanmark (rail infrastructure)
- Lines: Klampenborg Line
- Platforms: 1 island platform
- Tracks: 2 S-train service 2 bypass only
- Train operators: DSB

Construction
- Platform levels: 1
- Accessible: Yes
- Architect: Knud Tanggaard Seest

Other information
- Station code: Op
- Website: Official website

History
- Opened: 1924

Passengers
- 2004: 2025

Services
Preceding station	S-train	Following station
Klampenborg Terminus	C	Charlottenlund towards Frederikssund
Location

Ordrup station is a commuter rail station serving the suburb of Ordrup north of Copenhagen, Denmark. The station is located in the central part of the suburb a short distance from its main artery Ordrupvej.

Ordrup station is located on the Klampenborg radial of Copenhagen's S-train network, a hybrid commuter rail and rapid transit system serving Greater Copenhagen. It is served regularly by trains on the C-line which have a journey time to central Copenhagen of around 15 minutes. The station opened in 1924 on the Klampenborg Line between Copenhagen and Klampenborg which opened in 1863. It has been served by the S-train network since 1934. Its listed station building was built in 1924 to designs by the Danish architect Knud Tanggaard Seest (1879–1972).

== History ==
Ordrup station was not one of the original stations on the Klampenborg Line which opened in 1863. The station opened in 1924 after the village of Ordrup had developed into a suburb as the farmland was built over with single family detached homes and apartment buildings in the first half of the 20th century.

Just a few years later, the station was among the first served by the S-train, as service began on the 3 April 1934 when the line Frederiksberg-Vanløse-Hellerup-Klampenborg was opened.

== Architecture ==
The main station building was designed in Neoclassical style by the Danish architect Knud Tanggaard Seest (1879–1972), known for the numerous railway stations he designed across Denmark in functionalist style in his capacity of chief architect for the Danish State Railways from 1922 to 1949. The station was listed in the Danish registry of protected buildings and places in 1992. The station was renovated by Gottlieb Paludan Architects in 2014, recreating original features of the building and restoring the original colour scheme.

== Operations ==
Ordrup station is served regularly by trains on the C-line of Copenhagen's S-train network which run between Klampenborg and Frederikssund via central Copenhagen and Ballerup, and in exceptional circumstances by the F-line to Hellerup.

== Facilities ==
Inside the station building there is a waiting room and ticket machine. The station has a bicycle parking station as well as a car park with approximately 33 parking spaces.

== Cultural references ==
The station is used as a location in the 1943 Danish family film Moster fra Mols and in the 1961 Danish comedy film Støv på hjernen.

== Gallery ==
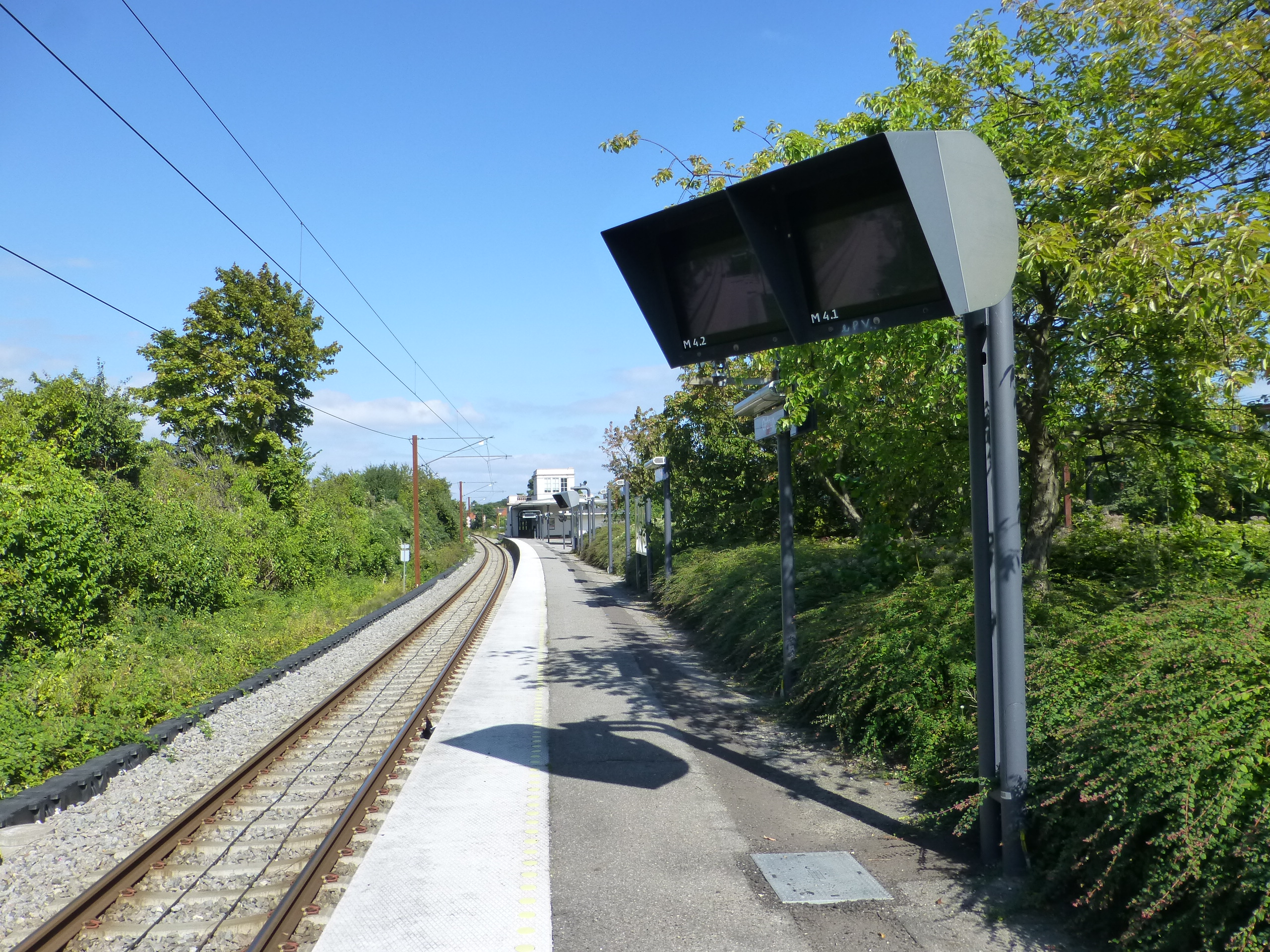
Platform with trains towards Copenhagen

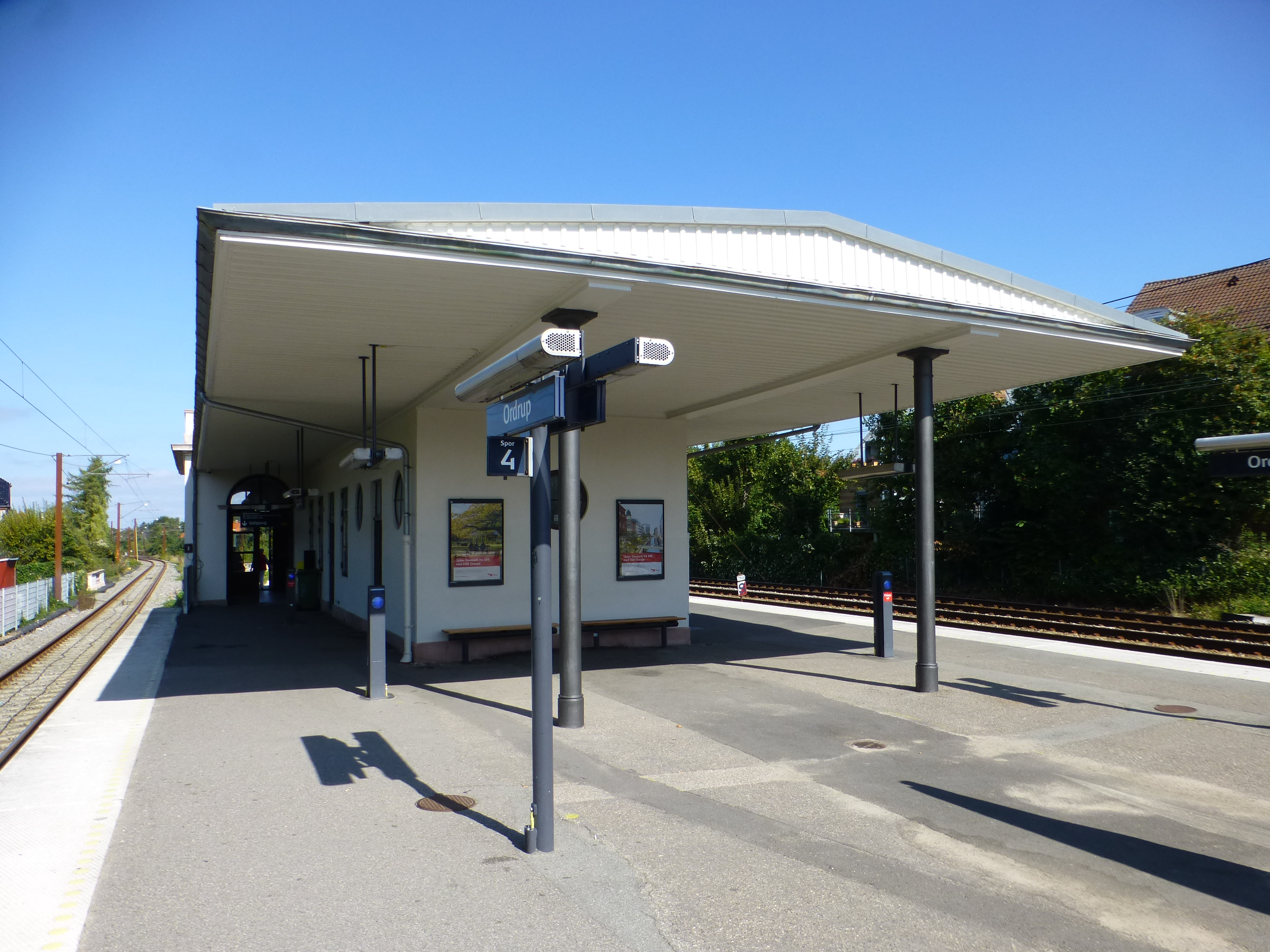
Station building seen from the platform

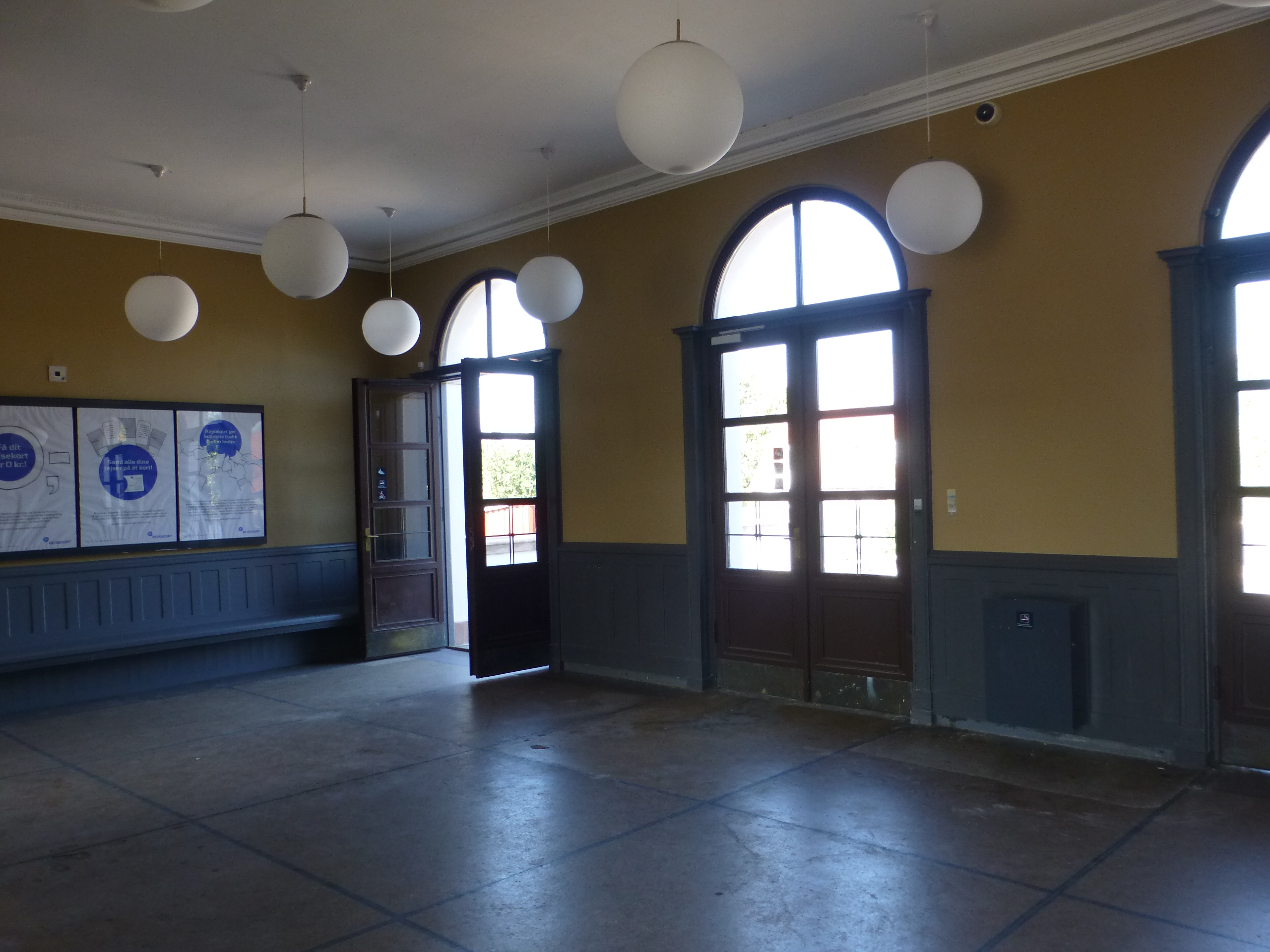
Interior of the station building

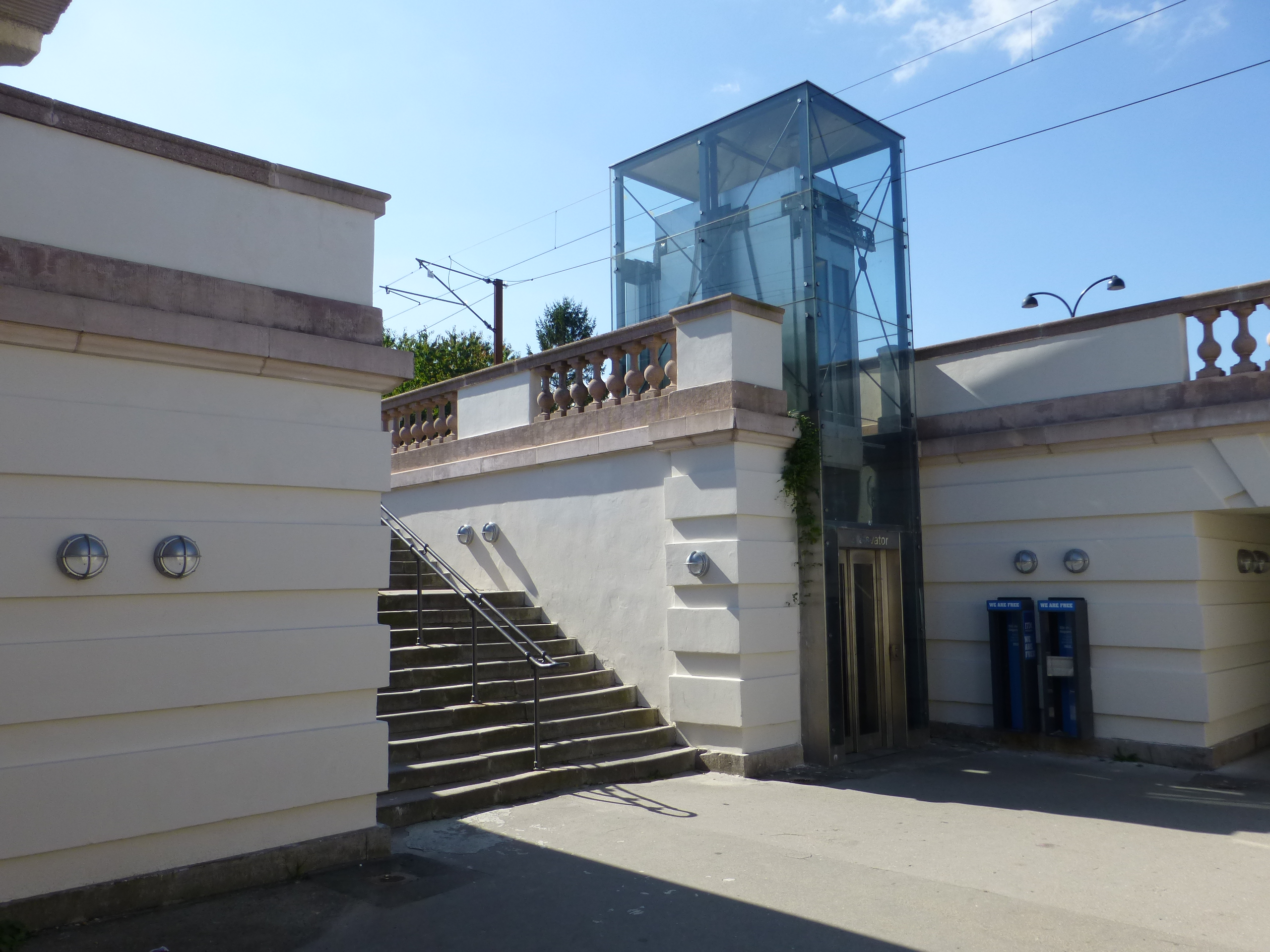
Stairs and elevator

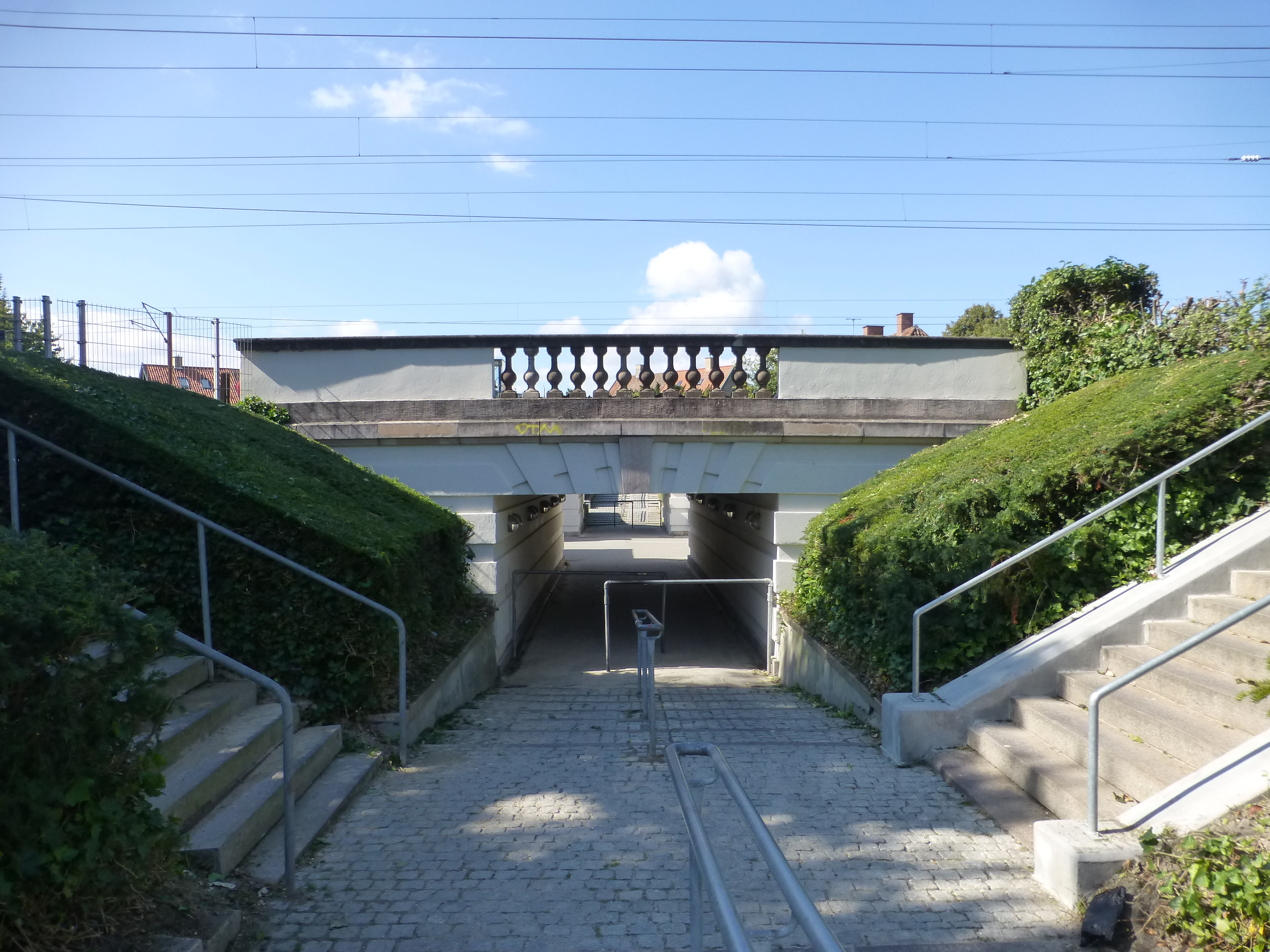
The station is accessed using a tunnel

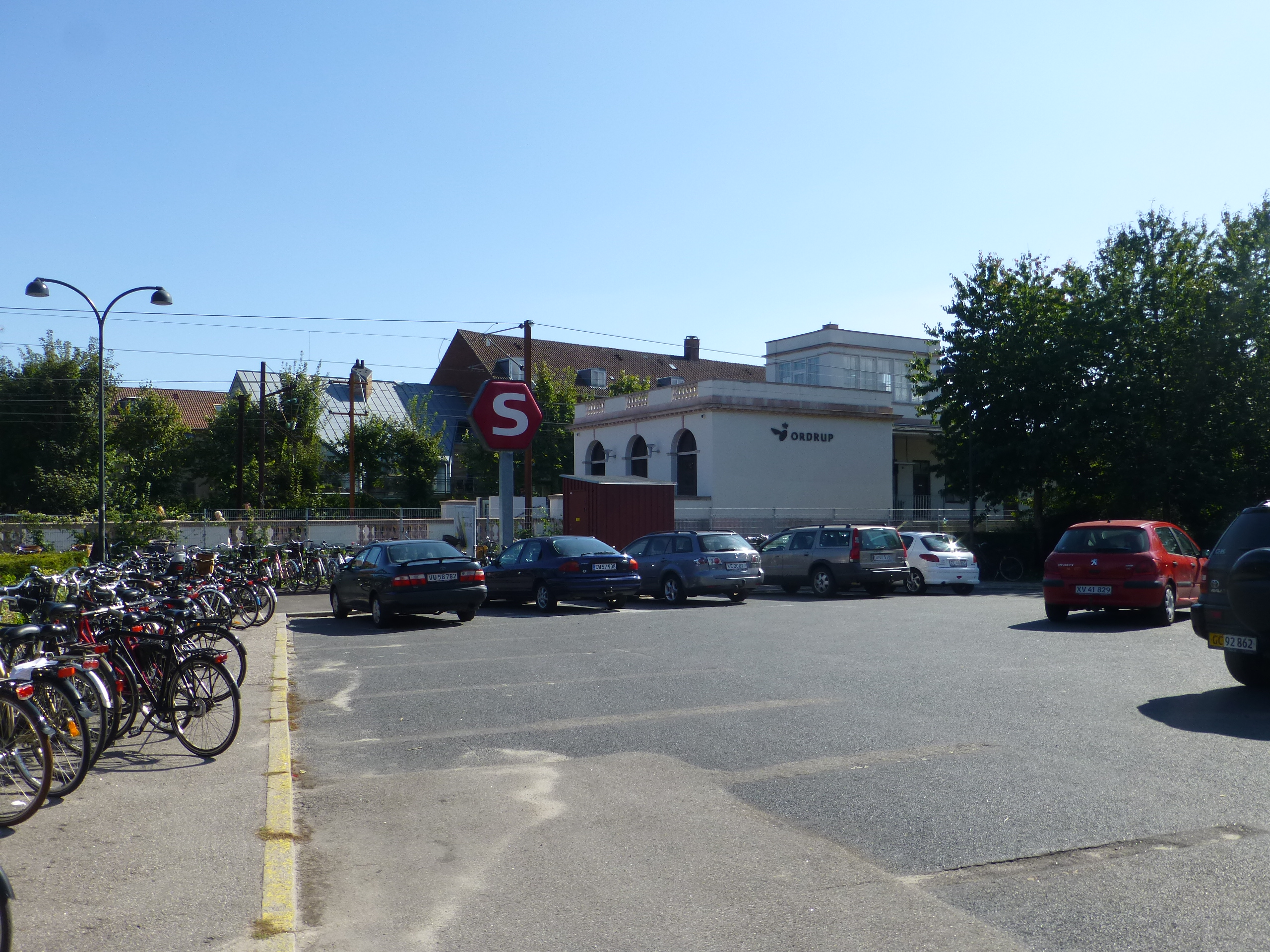
The station forecourt west of the tracks

== See also ==
- List of Copenhagen S-train stations
- List of railway stations in Denmark
- Rail transport in Denmark
- Transport in Copenhagen
