= Ordrup =

District of Gentofte Municipality, Denmark

Coordinates: 55°45′37″N 12°34′17″E

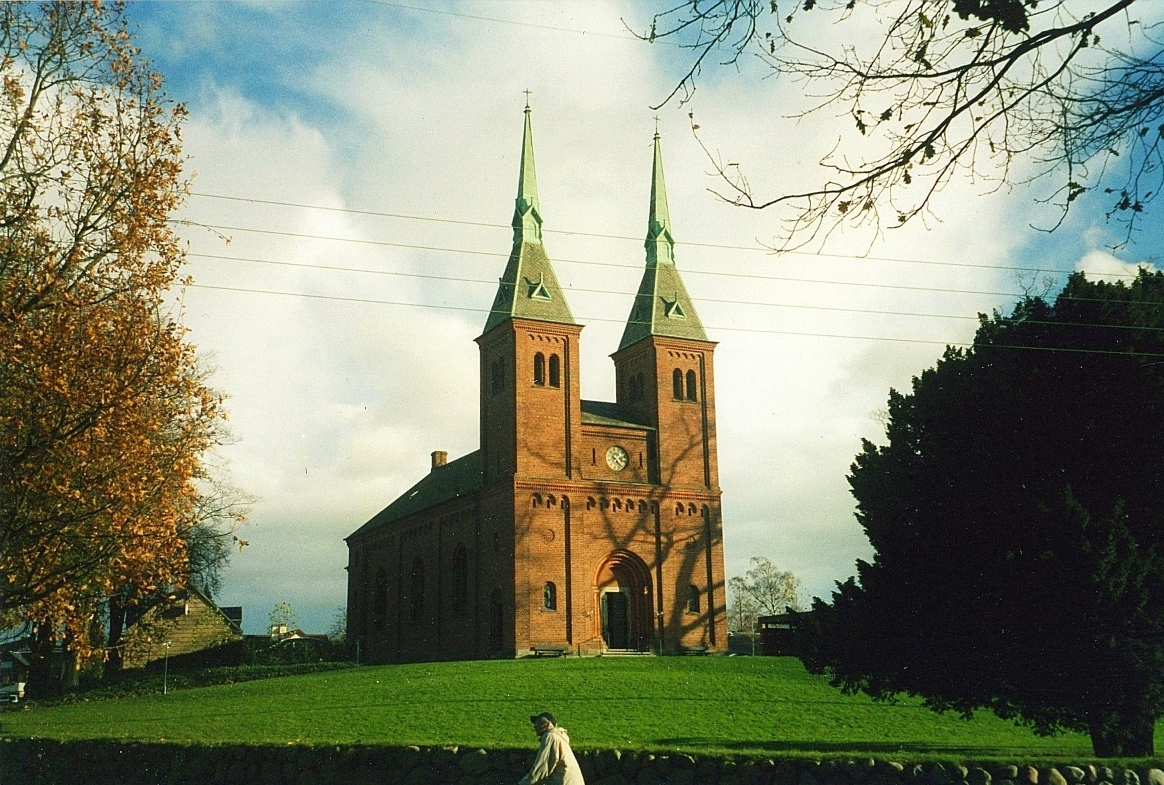
Ordrup Church

Ordrup is a district of Gentofte Municipality in the northern suburbs of Copenhagen, Denmark. It is located circa 12 km (7.5 mi) north of the city centre.

== History ==
=== Before 1860 ===
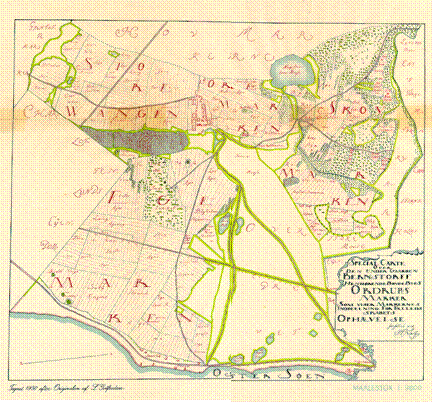
The map used when the land was divided among the individual farmers in 1765

Ordrup was originally a small village which only consisted of eight farms and a forge. The area became a popular destination for excursions for citizens from Copenhagen in the 17th century. The farmers supplemented their income by harvesting peat that was sold on the market in Copenhagen.

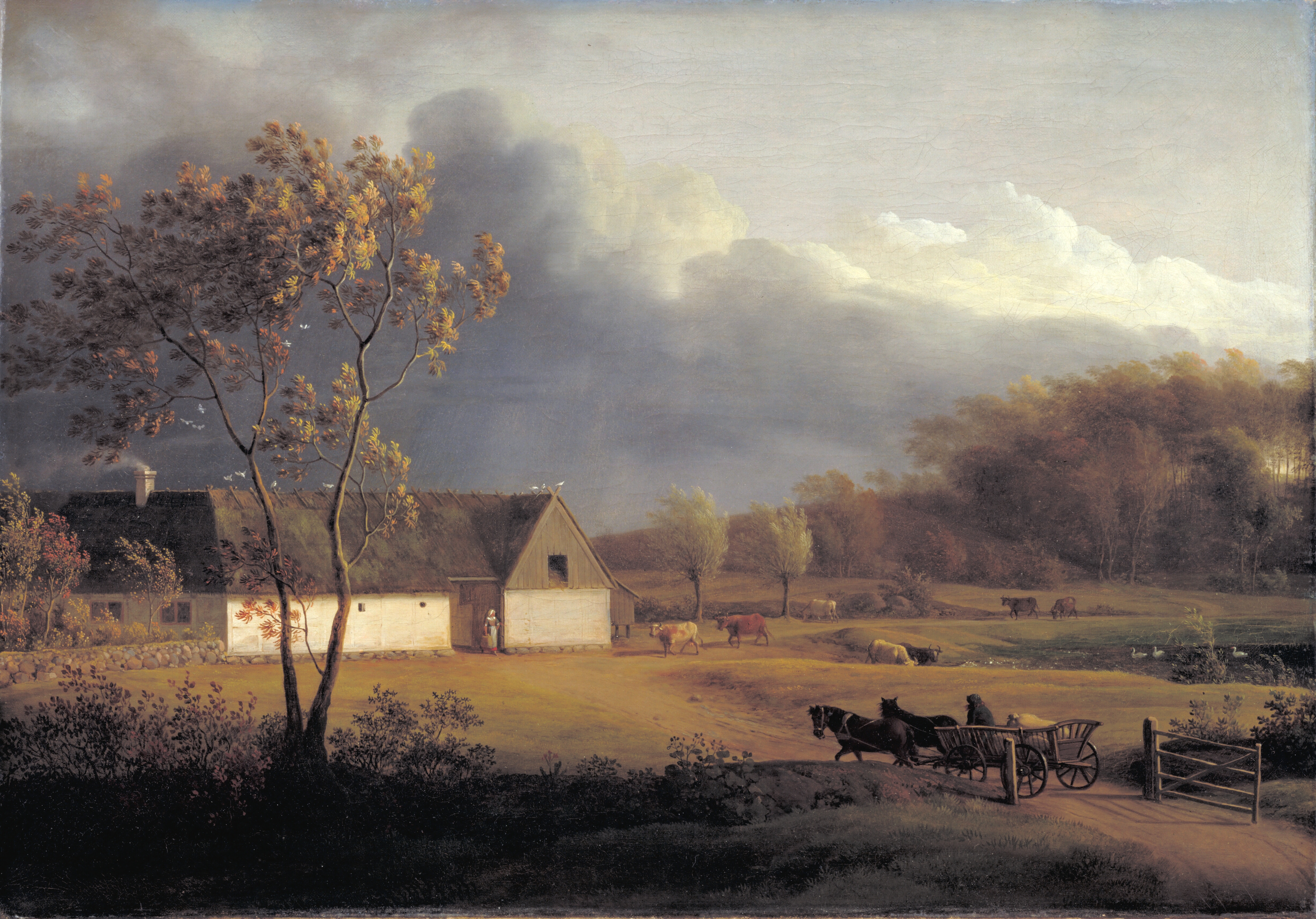
The Ordrup farm Eigaard painted by Jens Juel in c. 1793

Ordrup came under Bernstorff Palace in the 1760s after Foreign Minister Johann Hartwig Ernst von Bernstorff had received the entire area from Christian V as a gift. Bernstorff was a driving force behind the agricultural reforms of the time. A detailed map of the land was drawn up. The land was divided into lots. A draw which took place at Bernstorff Palace on 1 September 1765 distributed the lots among the local farmers. The names of the eight farms were Lindegaarden, Teglgaarden, Eigaarden, Holmegården, Skjoldgaarden, Hyldegaarden, Damgaarden and Skovgaarden. The reforms led to higher profits both for the farmers and Bernstorff.

An inn opened in Ordrup on 2 February 1768. In 1770 only Damgården had moved out of the village to be closer to its land. Most of the remaining farms and houses in the village were destroyed in a fire on 6 September 1798. The fire began in Teglgården's workshop when a pot of glue that boiled over ignited some shavings. It was decided to rebuild the farms out on their fields. The lots in the village were sold to craftsmen or people from Copenhagen who constructed summer residences on them.

Many of the farms were converted into country houses.

=== 1860–1900 ===
The area began to change after the opening of the Klampenborg Railway made the area more accessible from 1863. The first school in Ordrup opened on 1 May 1867. It was followed by the Catholic boys' school St. Andrew's College in 1873. The school had its own church. The school and church were built by Polly Berling, the owner of Ordruphøj, who had converted to Catholicism in 1869. A Protestant parish church was built a few years later.

=== 20th century ===
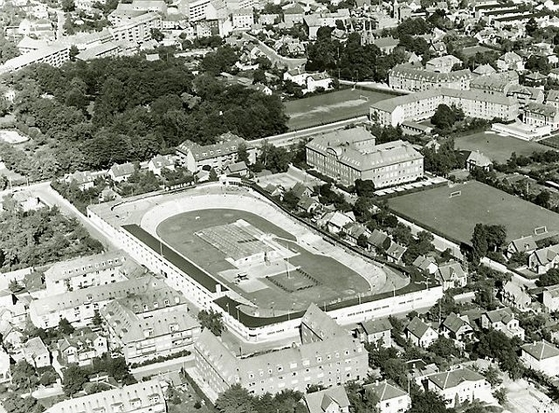
Ordrup velodrome and Ordrup School in 1956

Ordrup developed into a suburb as the farmland was built over with single family detached homes and apartment buildings in the first half of the 20th century.

== Landmarks ==
Places of interest include the art museum of Ordrupgaard and Ordrup Church completed in 1876. Ordrup Asyl opened in the 1860s and is still in use as a daycare.

== Transport ==
Ordrup railway station built in 1924 is on the Klampenborgbanen S-train radial line providing service to Copenhagen.

== Notable people ==
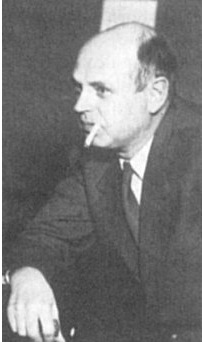
Poul Henningsen, ca.1937

- Johannes Gandil (1873 – 1956 in Ordrup) a Danish amateur footballer, team silver medallist at the 1908 Summer Olympics
- Ernestine Nyrop (1888 – 1975 in Ordrup) a textile artist and fresco painter, lived in Ordrup
- Holger Gilbert-Jespersen (1890 in Ordrup – 1975) a Danish flutist, orchestral musician and academic flute teacher
- Poul Henningsen (1894–1967) an author, critic, architect and designer; brought up in Ordrup
- Hans Christian Branner (1903 in Ordrup — 1966) a Danish novelist and playwright.
- Christian Møller (1904 – 1980 in Ordrup) a Danish chemist and physicist, worked on theory of relativity and theory of gravitation
- Gunnar Aagaard Andersen (1919 in Ordrup — 1982) a Danish sculptor, painter, designer and architect whose work belongs to the Concrete art movement
- Thorkild Hansen (1927 in Ordrup –1989) a Danish novelist most noted for his historical fiction.
- Flemming Østergaard (born 1943 in Det Gule Palæ, Ordrup) a retired businessman, linked to F.C. Copenhagen
- Jutta Graae (1906—1997) member of the Danish resistance, whose home in Ordrup was used by the resistance movement
- Kay Larsen (1879 – 1947 n Ordrup) Danish author and colonial historian
