= Klampenborg station =

Railway station in Greater Copenhagen, Denmark

Klampenborg
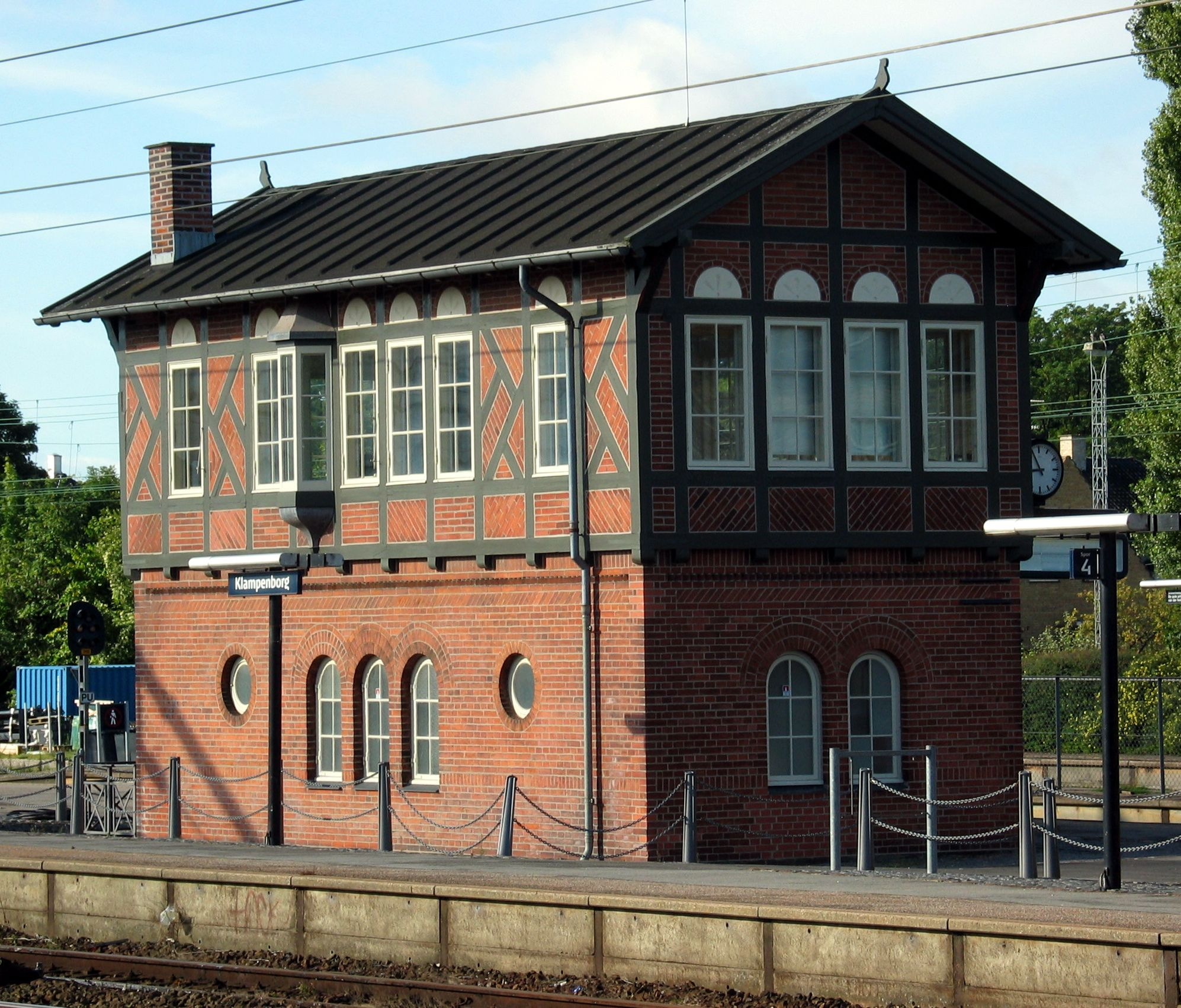

General information
- Location: Dyrehavevej 1; 2930 Klampenborg; Gentofte Municipality; Denmark
- Coordinates: 55°46′38″N 12°35′17″E
- Elevation: 4.9 metres (16 ft)
- Owner: DSB (station infrastructure); Banedanmark (rail infrastructure)
- Lines: Coast Line; Klampenborg Line
- Train operators: DSB
- Connections: Bus line 14, 185, 388 and night bus 85N

Construction
- Accessible: Yes

Other information
- Station code: Kl
- Website: Official website

History
- Opened: 22 July 1863; 163 years ago
- Rebuilt: 1897
- Electrified: 15 May 1934 (S-train); 1986 (Main line)

Services
| Preceding station | DSB | Following station |
|---|---|---|
| Skodsborg towards Helsingør | Elsinore–Copenhagen– Roskilde–Holbæk Regional train | Hellerup towards Holbæk |
| Skodsborg towards Helsingør | Elsinore–Copenhagen– Roskilde–Næstved Regional train | Hellerup towards Næstved |
| Preceding station | S-train | Following station |
| Terminus | C | Ordrup towards Frederikssund |
Location

Klampenborg station is a regional and commuter railway station serving the suburb of Klampenborg north of Copenhagen, Denmark. Train services to Klampenborg Station are used by people in large numbers who during the summer season visit the Dyrehavsbakken amusement park, the Jægersborg Dyrehave forest park or enjoy the sun at Bellevue Beach.

The station is located on the Coast Line between Copenhagen and Helsingør, and is the northern terminus of the Klampenborg radial of Copenhagen's S-train network. It is served by a frequent regional rail service between Helsingør and Copenhagen, operated by Danish State Railways, as well as line C and line F of the S-train network.

== History ==
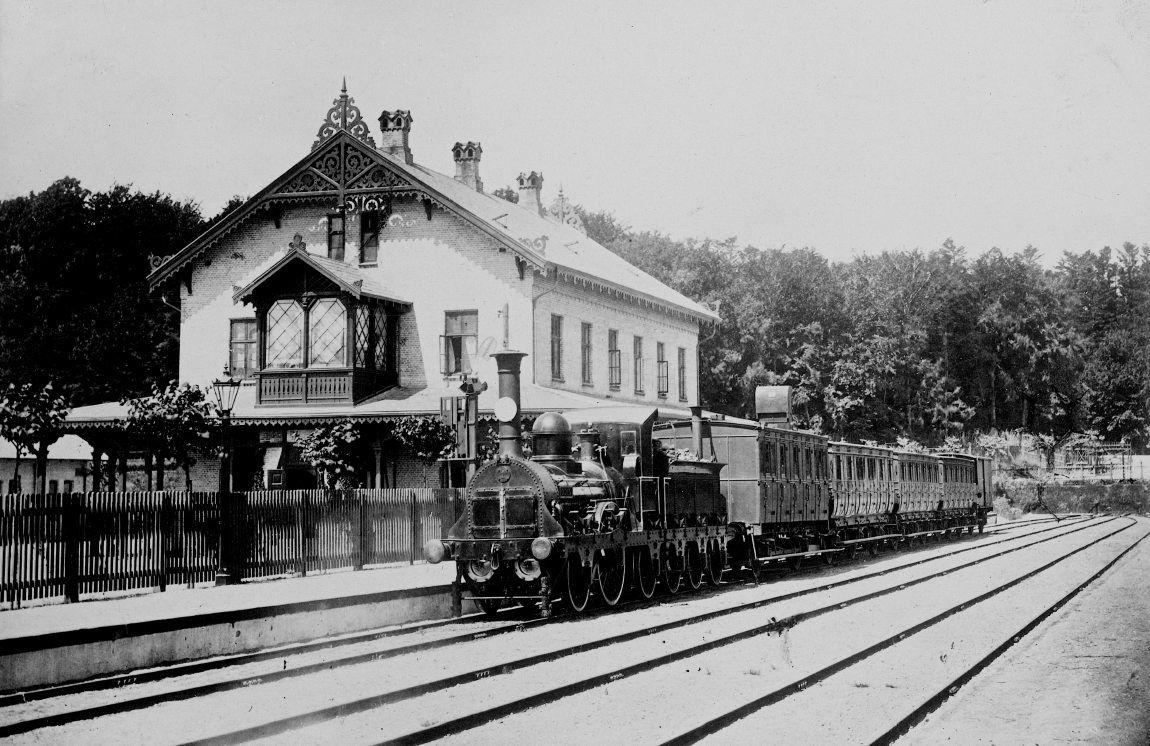
The station in 1868

Klampenborg Station opened on 22 July 1863 as the northern terminus of the Klampenborg Line which connected Copenhagen with Klampenborg as a branch line of the North Line between Copenhagen and Elsinore via Hillerød.

The Klampenborg Line was initially opened and owned by the privately owned Zealand Railway Company (Danish: Det Sjællandske Jernbaneselskab (DSJS)). On 1 January 1880, the railway station was taken over by the Danish state along with the Zealand Railway Company. And on 1 October 1885, it became part of the new national railway company, the Danish State Railways.

The current station building was built in 1897. Like the other stations on the Øresund line, it was designed by Heinrich Wenck. The station was among the first served by the S-train, as service began on the 3 of April 1934 when the line Frederiksberg-Vanløse-Hellerup-Klampenborg was opened.

== Architecture ==
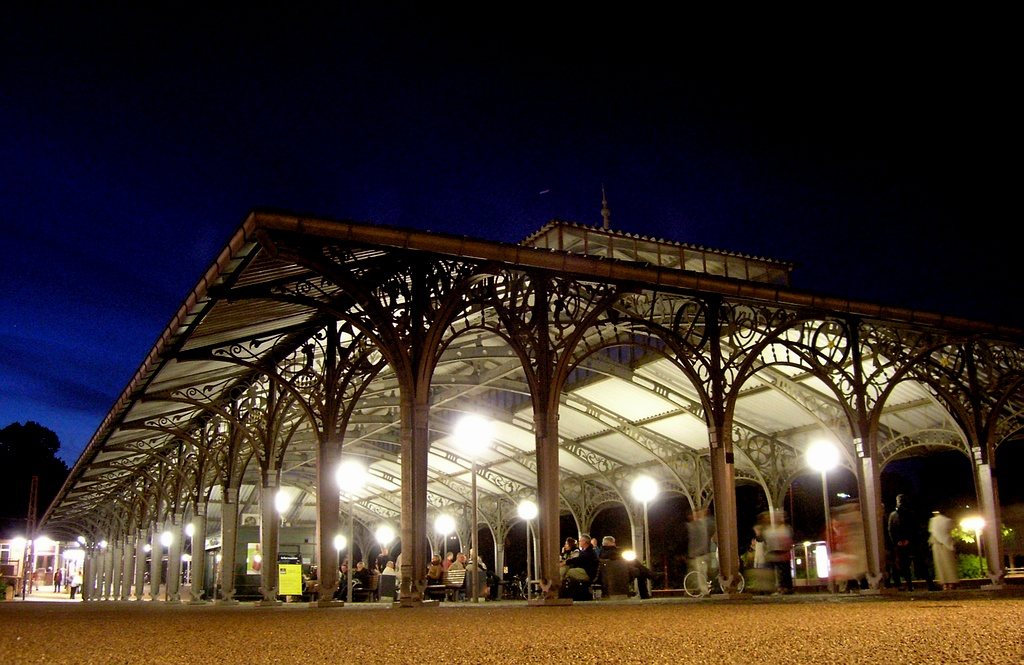
Station covered waiting area

In line with the stations on the Coast line, as well as of Heinrich Wenck's work in general, the station is designed in National Romantic style. The station site also include an open waiting area covered by an elaborate cast iron roof. All buildings are listed.

== Facilities ==
The station forecourt has a taxi stand, and the station also has a bicycle parking station as well as a large car park with approximately 240 parking spaces. During the summer season, it is also possible to take a horse-drawn carriage (privateer carriage) from Klampenborg Station to Dyrehavsbakken or around Jægersborg Dyrehave.

== Cultural references ==
Klampenborg station is used as a location in the popular 1953 Danish family comedy film Father of Four, and the 2000 Danish black comedy crime film Flickering Lights.

== See also ==
- List of Copenhagen S-train stations
- List of railway stations in Denmark
