= Ordrup Asyl =

Ordrup Asyl, later Kong Christian IX's Asyl and now Kong Christian Den Ix og Dronning Louises Børnehave, is a daycare institution established in the 1860s in Ordrup to the north of Copenhagen, Denmark. Its Neo-Gothic building at Ordruphøjvej 7 is from 1909 and still in use as a kindergarten.

== History ==
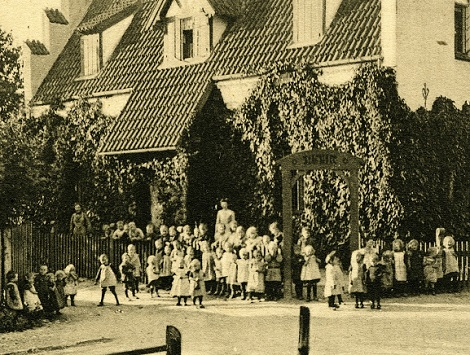
Children in front of Ordrup Asyl

Ordrup Asyl was established at private initiative in 1860 by a group of prominent citizens led by the pastor at Gentofte Church. The institution provided day-time care for children of families where both families worked outside the home. The parents usually worked at local farms or country house

In 1863, Mayor Sass donated his country house at Ordruphøjvej to the institution. The current building was constructed in 1898 to a Neo-Gothic design by municipal architect Andreas Theil. The construction cost, circa 25,000 Danish krones, was donated by Jacob Moresco, one of the wealthiest citizens in Gentofte at the time and owner of nearby country house Adelaide.

== Today ==
The building is still in use as a kindergarten. The institution is called Kong Christian Den IX og Dronning Louises Børnehave. The laundry room contains a commemorative plaque.
