= Klampenborg =

Suburb of Copenhagen in Gentofte Municipality, Denmark

Coordinates: 55°46′N 12°35′E

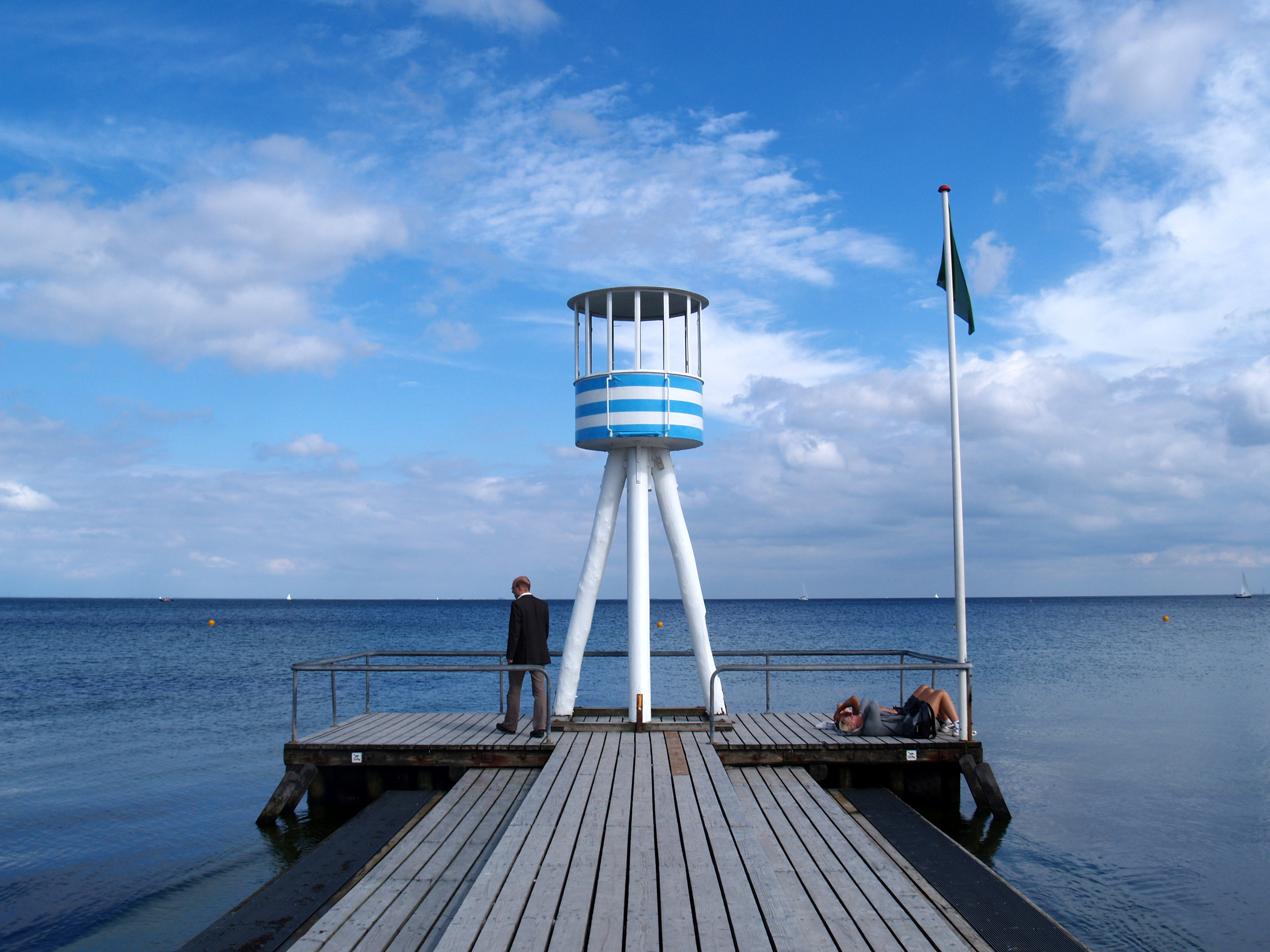
Arne Jacobsen-designed lifeguard tower at Bellevue Beach

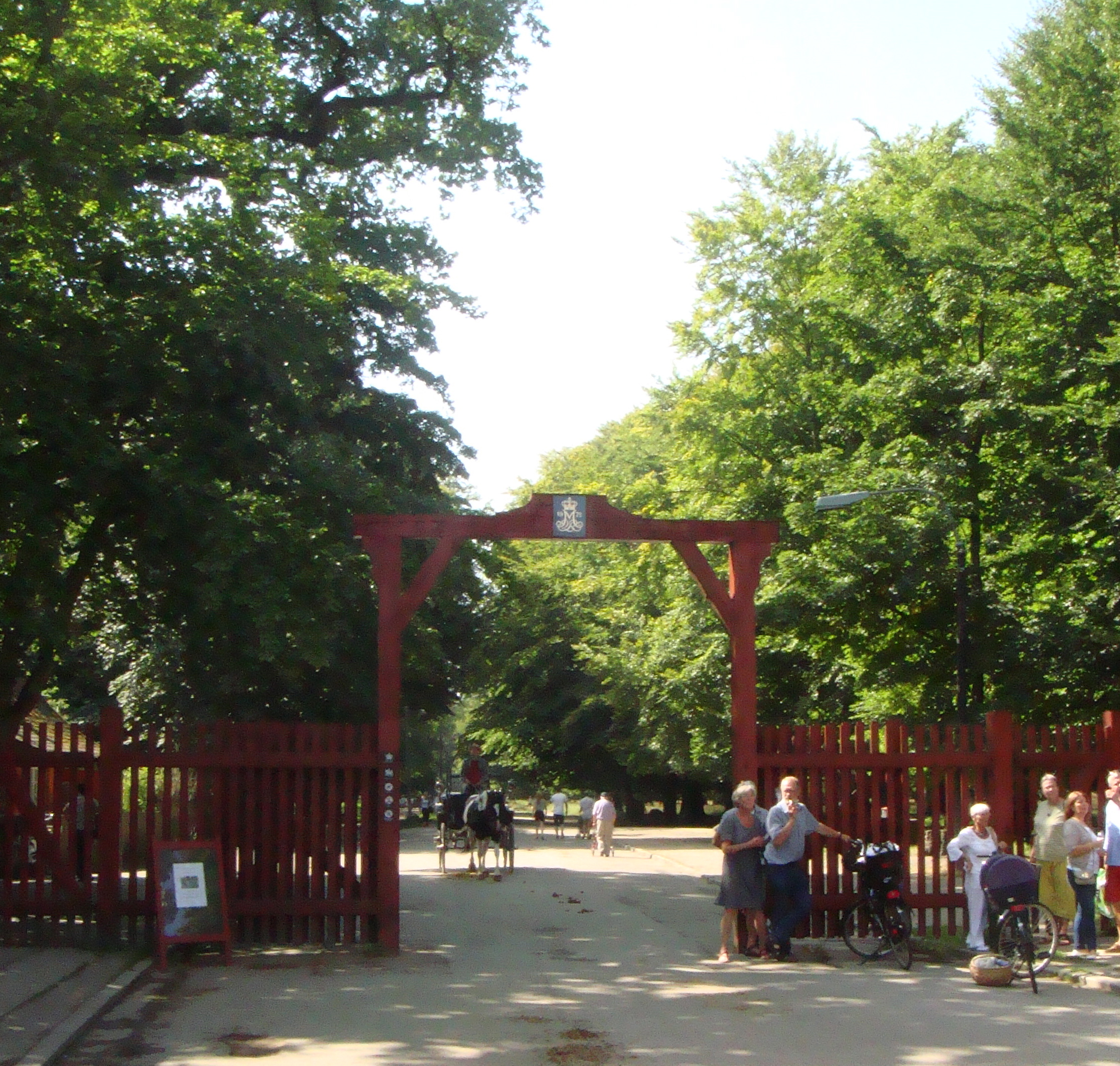
The entrance to Jægersborg Dyrehave

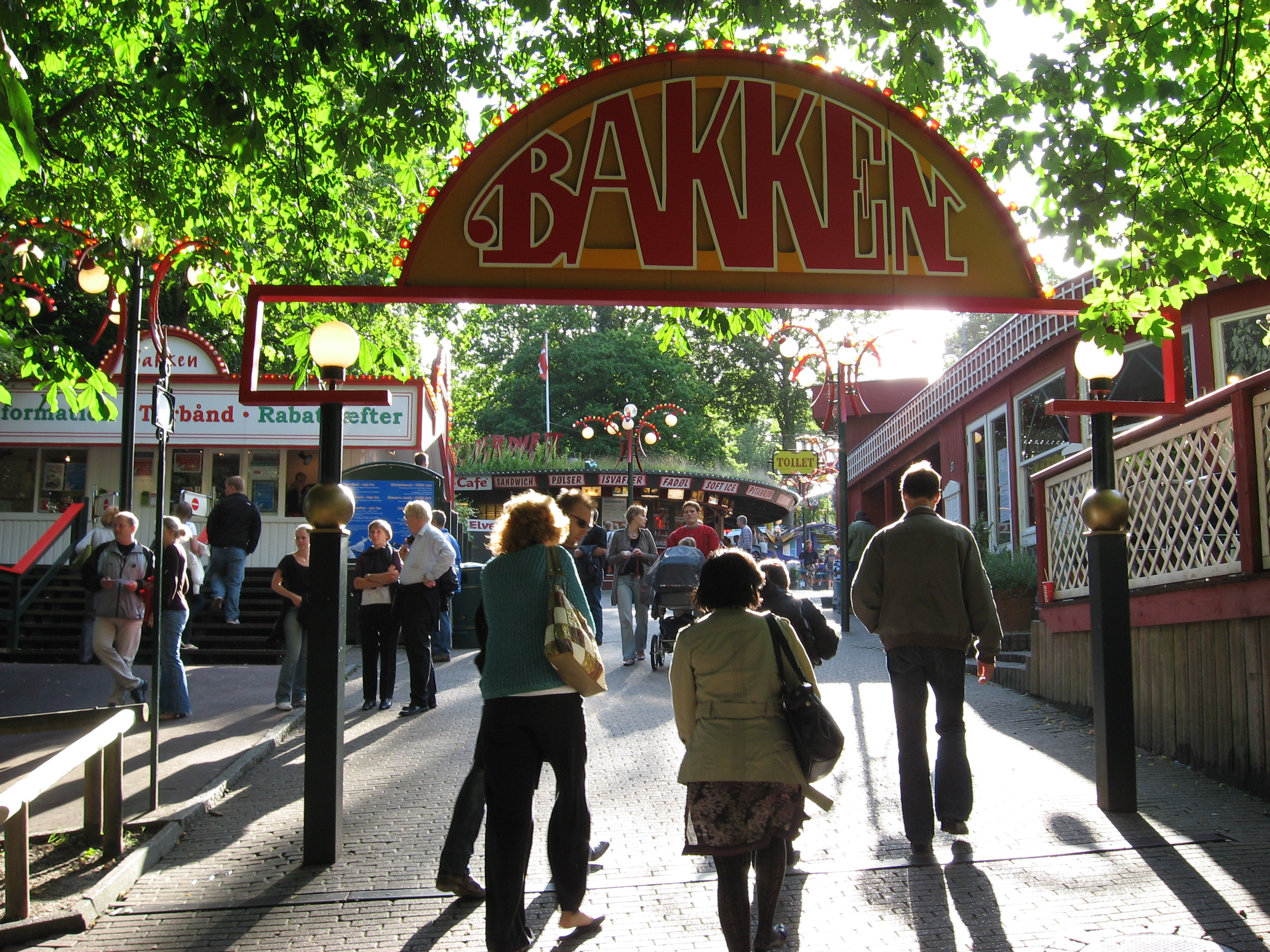
The entrance to "Bakken"

Klampenborg is a northern suburb of Copenhagen, Denmark. It is located in Gentofte municipality, directly on the shores of the Øresund Strait, between Taarbæk and Skovshoved.

Like other neighbourhoods along the Øresund coast, Klampenborg is an affluent area with many large houses.

== Landmarks ==
Klampenborg is known for a cluster of building projects by the functionalist Danish architect Arne Jacobsen. These include Bellevue Beach, the Bellavista housing estate and the Bellevue Theatre, all completed between 1932 and 1936 as some of the earliest Danish examples of Modernism.

Klampenborg is the main gateway to the extensive Jægersborg Deer Park, one of the most popular green areas in greater Copenhagen, known for its large deer population, the Hermitage Royal Hunting Lodge and ancient oak trees. The entrance, one of many, is adjacent to Klampenborg Station and is marked by a red-painted wooden gate. Adjoining the park is the oldest operating amusement park in the world, Dyrehavsbakken, also located near the station.

Also adjacent to Deer Park is Klampenborg Racecourse, which hosts a season of thoroughbred racing over a flat 12-furlong turf course. The full-service racecourse features paddock, grandstand, turf club and parimutuel betting. Besides park and amusements, Klampenborg consists of residences, mostly single-family houses and large villas, the most notable of which is Hvidøre, former home-in-exile of the Danish-born dowager empress of Russia, Maria Feodorovna.

Architecture, Deer Park, Bakken, thoroughbred racing, white-sand Bellevue Beach, with panoramic view of Øresund and Sweden beyond, and easy access make Klampenborg a popular day-trip destination for locals and visitors.

== Transport ==
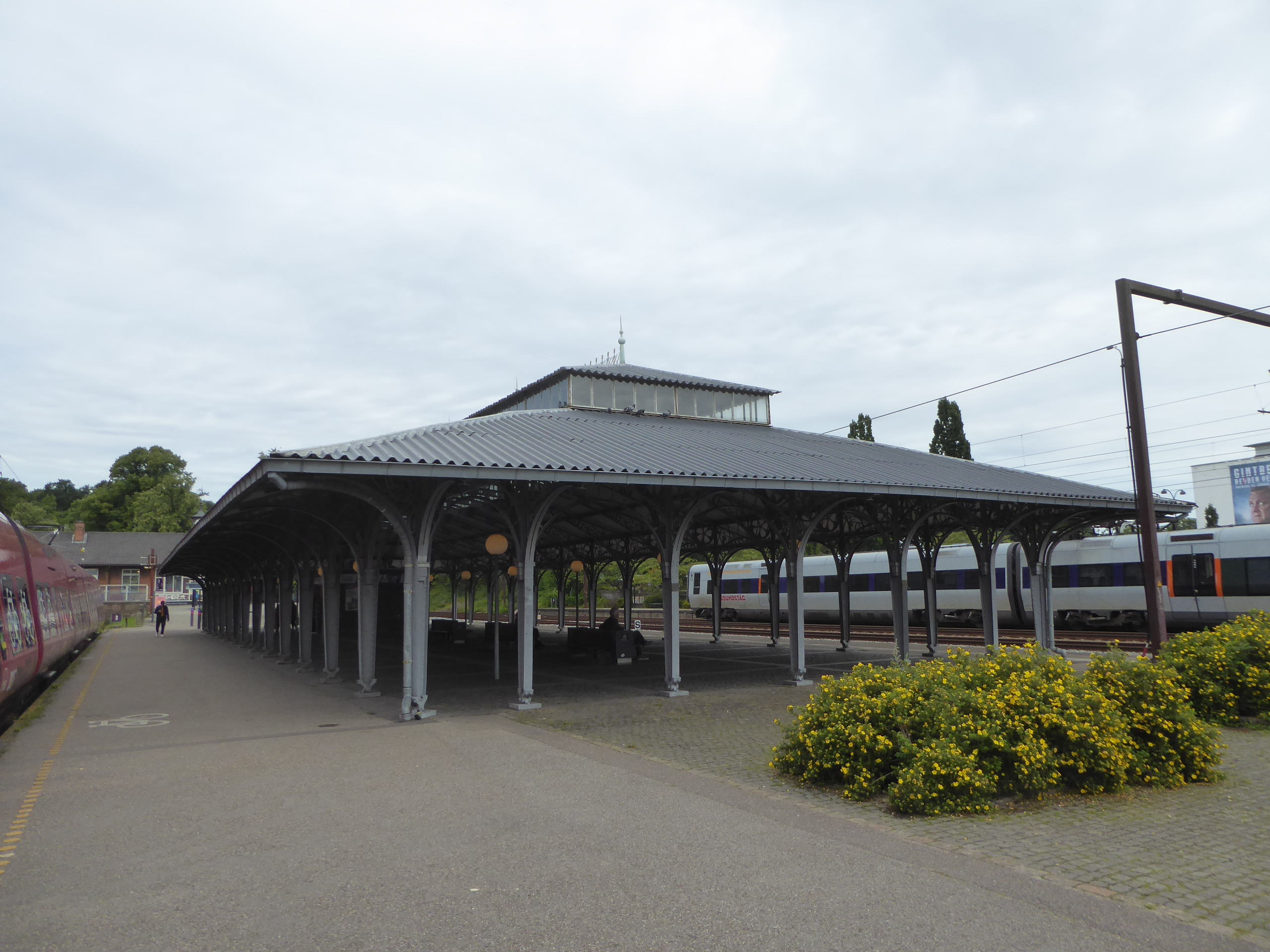
Klampenborg railway station.

Klampenborg is served by Klampenborg railway station which is located on the Coast Line between Copenhagen and Helsingør, and is the northern terminus of the Klampenborg radial of Copenhagen's S-train network. It is served by a frequent regional rail service between Helsingør and Copenhagen, operated by the Danish State Railways, as well as line C of the S-train network.

== Notable people ==
=== Public service and business ===
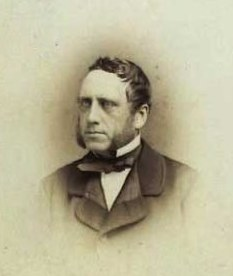
Ole Bernt Suhr, pre 1875

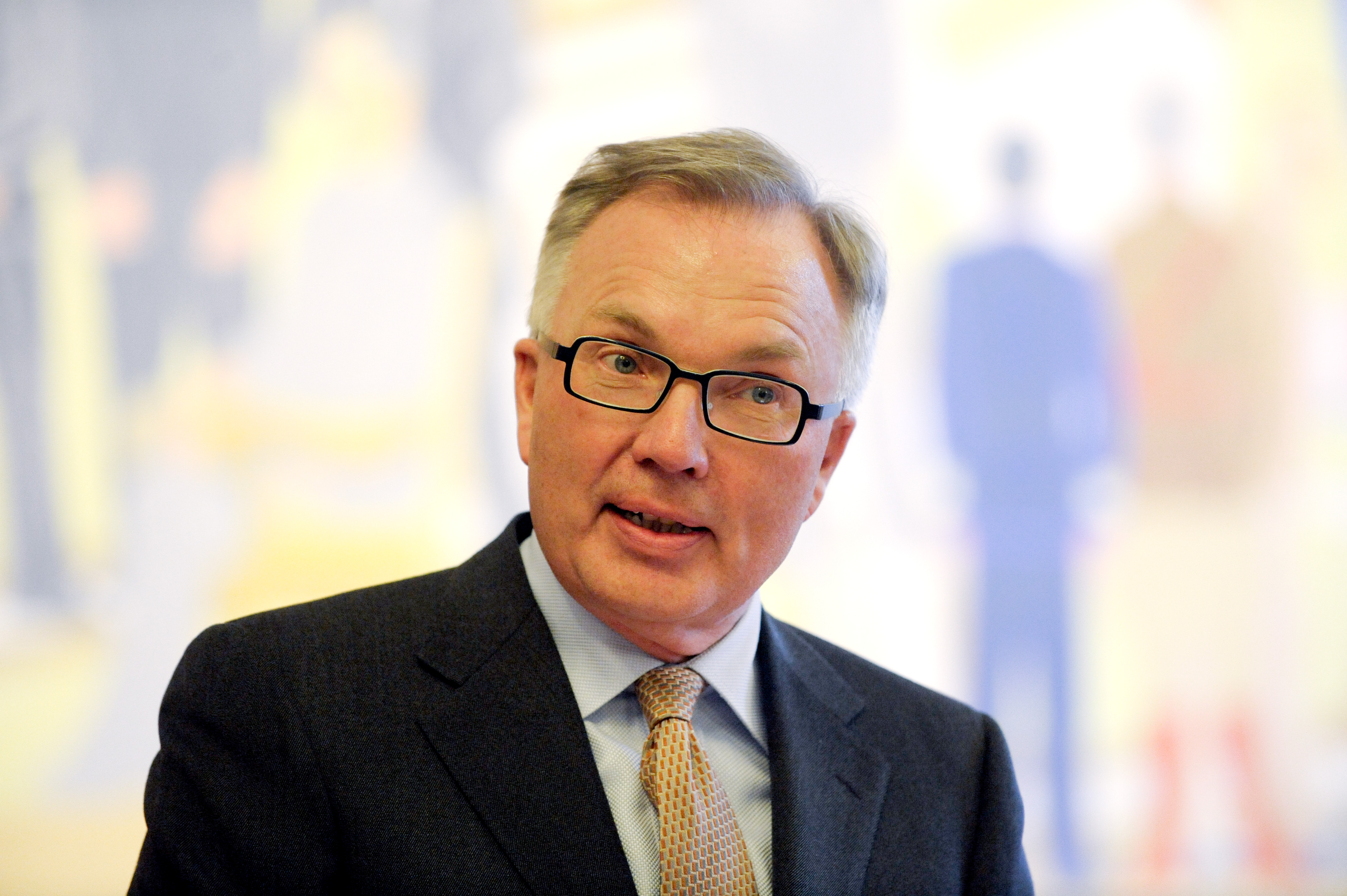
Fritz H. Schur, 2010

- Ole Berendt Suhr (1813 - 1875 in Sølyst, Klampenborg), a Danish merchant, investor, landowner and philanthropist
- Count Eigil Knuth (1903 in Klampenborg – 1966) a Danish explorer, archaeologist, sculptor and writer
- Vilhelm Wohlert (1920 – 2007 in Klampenborg) a Danish architect. worked on the Louisiana Museum of Modern Art
- Fritz Schur (born 1951) a Danish businessman with ties to both royal, business and political circles; lives on the Christiansholm estate in Klampenborg

=== The arts ===
- Dagmar Olrik (1860 – 1932 in Klampenborg) a Danish painter and tapestry artist
- Marie Henriques (1866 in Klampenborg – 1944) a Danish painter who created landscapes, figure paintings and portraits
- Arthur Nielsen (1883 – 1946 in Klampenborg) a Danish artist of Danish landscapes
- Preben Philipsen (1910 – 2005 in Klampenborg) was a Danish film producer

=== Sport ===
- Harald Nielsen (1941 – 2015 in Klampenborg) a Danish association footballer and entrepreneur
- Kim Andersen (born 1963 in Klampenborg) a jockey in Scandinavian horse racing.

== See also ==
- Skovshoved
