= Dyrehavsbakken =

Amusement park in Lyngby-Taarbæk Kommune, Denmark

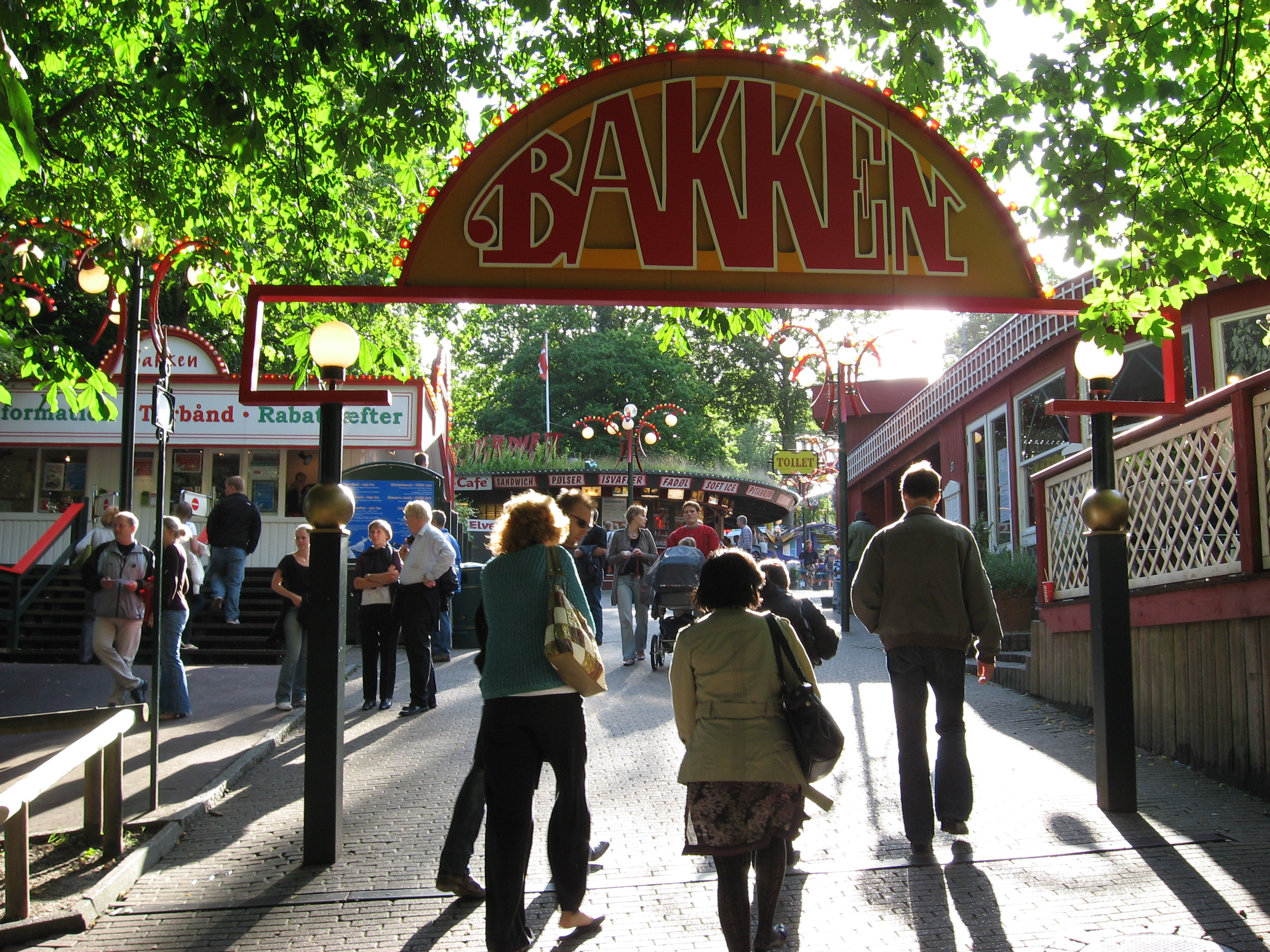
- Entrance to Bakken
- Interactive map of Dyrehavsbakken
- Location: Klampenborg, Denmark
- Coordinates: 55.775813°N 12.574818°E
- Opened: 1583; 443 years ago
- General manager: Niels-Erik Winther
- Slogan: Der er noget om snakken, der er dejligt på Bakken (There is something to it, Bakken is lovely)
- Area: 75,000 m^{2} (810,000 sq ft)

Attractions
- Total: 33
- Roller coasters: 5
- Water rides: 1
- Website: Bakken.dk

Dyrehavsbakken (lit. 'The Animal Park Hill'), commonly referred to as Bakken (lit. 'The Hill', to distinguish it from Dyrehaven, a royal deer park with public access) is an amusement park in Lyngby-Taarbæk, Denmark, near Klampenborg and approximately 10 km (6 mi) north of central Copenhagen. It is located in the southern part of Dyrehaven, around 600 metres (0.4 mi) away from a public transport connection to the center of Copenhagen (Klampenborg S-train Station).

It opened in 1583 (443 years ago) and is the world's oldest operating amusement park.

With 2.5–2.9 million visitors per year, it is the second most popular attraction in Denmark, after the more widely known Tivoli Gardens amusement park. Access to the area is free, and admissions are purchased separately for the individual attractions, unlike Tivoli.

== History ==
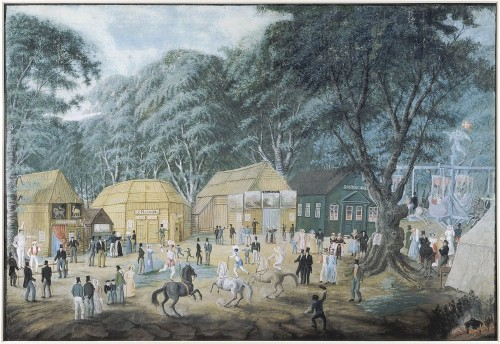
Dyrehavsbakken, c. 1825

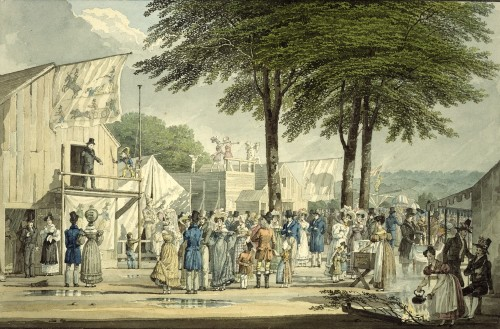
Dyrehavsbakken in 1840

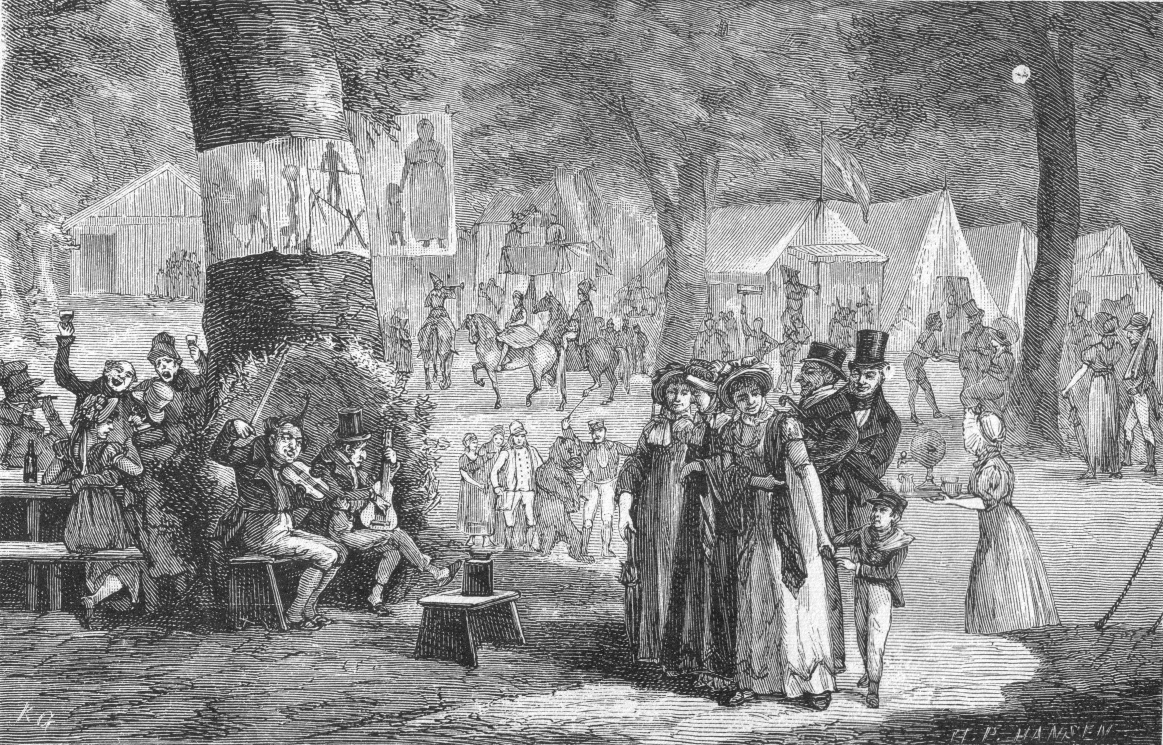
Dyrehavsbakken in the 19th century

The origins of Dyrehavsbakken can be traced back to 1583 when Kirsten Piil discovered a natural spring in what is now known as Jægersborg Dyrehave or Dyrehaven, a large forest park north of Copenhagen. Residents of Copenhagen were attracted to the spring water due to the poor water quality in central Copenhagen during this period. Many believed the natural spring to have curative properties, and therefore Piil's discovery drew large crowds, especially in the springtime. These large crowds attracted entertainers and hawkers, whose presence are the origins of the amusement park today.

For a period the area that the spring was located on was not open to the public, due to it being on royal hunting grounds. In 1669, King Frederick III decided to set up an animal park in the area, and his son Christian V expanded the park to 3–4 times its original size after becoming king in 1670. The area was named Jægersborg Dyrehave, its present name, in 1671. The park was off-limits to the public until 1756, under Frederick V.

Open to the general public once again, Dyrehavsbakken began to flourish. Entertainers, hawkers, and innkeepers returned to the area, and Bakken's growing reputation throughout Europe attracted other entertainers and artists, including Pjerrot, a clown who still is a fixture at the park today. The park continued to grow even throughout the Napoleonic Wars. Its popularity was later aided by easier accessibility due to the development of steamships in 1820 and railroads in 1864, as well as publicity from poets and authors.

As the popularity of Bakken grew, its conditions worsened. As a result, some of the business owners, or tent owners as they are still called today, created the Dyrehavsbakken Tent Owners' Association of 1885. The association improved garbage collection, restroom facilities, water supply, publicity, and helped bring electricity to the park. The association is still around today, and all businesses operating in the park are required to join.

The entertainment options also improved over time. Cabarets such as Sansouci, which opened in 1866, and Bakkens Hvile, which opened in 1877, became increasingly popular. The 20th century brought other ventures, such as the Circus Revue and automated moving rides. Over time, more modern rides and entertainment options have been introduced.

== Rides ==
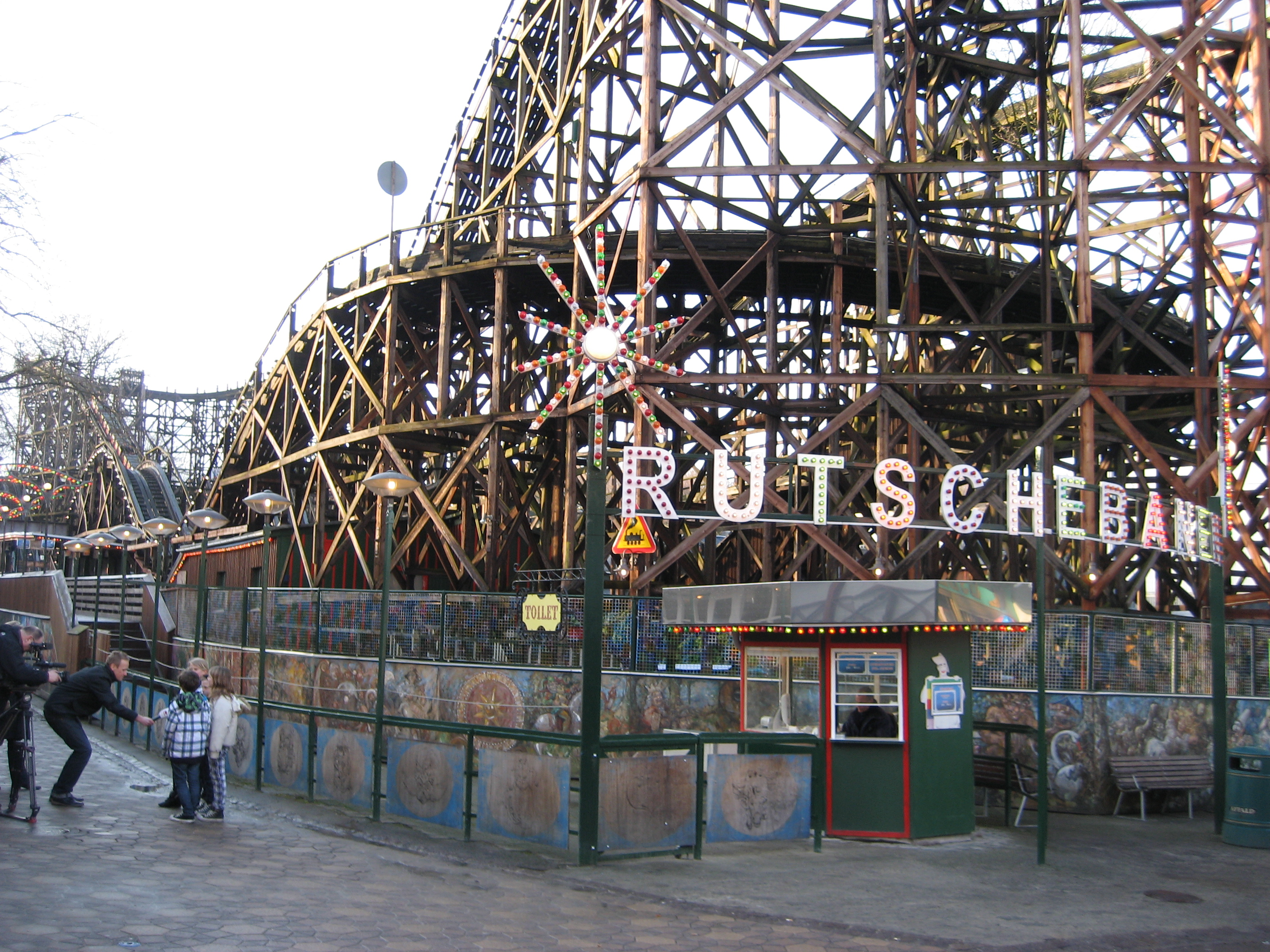
Rutschebanen roller coaster

Bakken is home to five roller coasters, the most famous of which is Rutschebanen (lit. 'Roller coaster'), a wooden roller coaster open since 1932. It was deemed a Coaster Classic by the American Coaster Enthusiasts (ACE) until the end of the 2009 season, after which the trains were updated and the brakemen who rode along to control the speed were retired, leading ACE to rescind its Classic status. The park is also home to dozens of other amusements and smaller rides suited for all ages.

=== Roller coasters ===
Ride name	Type	Year opened	Manufacturer	Additional information
Mariehønen (Ladybird)	steel sit down	1981	Zierer	Reaches a speed of 26 km/h (16 mph) on a 60 m (200 ft) long track and a height of 3 m (9.8 ft). Small Tivoli model, train 2x5.
Mine Train Ulven (The Wolf)	steel sit down	1997	Intamin	Reaches a speed of 65 km/h (40 mph). Mine train model.
Rutschebanen	wooden sit down	1932	Lebela	Reaches a speed of 75 km/h (47 mph) on a 852 m (2,795 ft) long track and a height of 22 m (72 ft).
Tornado	steel sit down spinning coaster	2009	Intamin	The cars spin around the 300 m (980 ft) long track.
De Vilde Mus (The Wild Mice)	steel sit down	2012	Mack Rides	Compact wild mouse coaster, car 2+2.

=== Other rides ===
Each of the rides requires a certain number of coupons:

- Afro Cups – spinning cups (4 coupons)
- Bumper Cars – bumper cars (81)
- Crazy Theater – indoor laser shoot-out (6 coupons)
- Enterprise – enterprise spinner (5 coupons)
- Extreme – giant swing (6 coupons)
- 5D Cinema – shows 4 different movies, each about 10–12 minutes long (8 coupons)
- Ghost Train – indoor ghost train (5 coupons)
- Gyngen – a Zamperla Happy Swing that opened in 2024 (7 coupons)
- Hullabaloo – funny house (4 coupons)
- Jungle Boats – boats and water shooting (4 coupons)
- Polyp – polyp spinner (5 coupons)
- Rodeobanen – bumper cars (8 coupons)
- Safari – dark ride laser shoot out (5 coupons)
- Samba Tower – air carousel (4 coupons)
- Svæveflyveren – Zamperla WindstarZ relocated from Emerald Park in 2024 (8 coupons)
- Spinning Car – hovercraft ride (4 coupons)
- SRV – simulator ride (4 coupons)
- Swan Station – aerial swan ride (5 coupons)
- Tidsmaskinen – a Zamperla NebulaZ, installed for the 2021 season (8 coupons)
- Tower Thrill – a 30m-tall drop tower (6 coupons)
- Water Cannon – water shoot out on boats (5 coupons)
- Viking Ship Dragon – swinging Viking ship (5 coupons)
- Water Slide – a log flume ride. Travels a 390-metre-long (1,280 ft) course and has two drops on the way (5 coupons)

=== Children's rides ===
- Bin Express – roundabout (4 coupons)
- Børne Ferris Wheel – mini Ferris wheel (4 coupons)
- Carousel – children's carousel (3 coupons)
- Hip Hop – mini drop tower (4 coupons)
- Jeep – on track jeep ride (3 coupons)
- Klatrejungle – challenge course
- Little Trains – mini train ride (4 coupons)
- Mini Dumpo – circular ride (3 coupons)
- Santa's Obstacle Course – play area

=== Shows ===
- Bakkens Hvile – cabaret show
- Circus Revue – revue show from 19 May to 27 August
- Pjerrot the Clown – the park's mascot
- Bakken Animals – animal show

=== Former attractions ===
Ride name	Year opened	Year closed	Manufacturer	Description
Dillen	before 2003	2020	Zierer	A jet-ski ride. It was retired at the end of the 2020 season in order to accommodate Tidsmaskinen.
Græshoppen	2021	2023	KMG	A Move It 24 thrill ride that spun and flipped riders upside down. The attraction was later sold off to Dutch showman Reijnders and renamed The Beast, under which it travels the fair circuit.
Racing	1972	2020	Zierer	This single-seat car-style coaster was built in 1971, and retired at the end of the 2020 season. It was replaced by Græshoppen.

== Other attractions ==
Bakken contains many other entertainment options in addition to rides. This includes seven different gaming halls that have carnival-style games, slot machines, and dancing. The park's mascot, Pjerrot the clown, performs every day for young children. The park is also home to Bakkens Hvile music hall, where cabarets are common, as well as the Circus Revue, a live circus-style performance. There are also live music performances in lounges and bars across the park on a regular basis.

The park is home to dozens of restaurants of several types and price ranges. The style of the restaurants ranges from street food vendors, to buffets, to fancier restaurants. The type of food represented ranges from standard amusement park fare, such as hamburgers and cotton candy, to traditional Danish cuisine, such as Pølser (Danish hot dogs), Æbleskiver (Danish popovers), and Smørrebrød (open-faced sandwiches), to many other types of international cuisine. Bakken also contains numerous bars and lounges, where popular Danish beers such as Carlsberg and Tuborg are served.

== Operation ==
Bakken is open daily from the end of March through the end of August. Entrance into the park area is free of charge, but rides and attractions require payment. Prices depend on the ride or attraction. Discounted coupons, wristbands, and season passes can also be purchased.

== Gallery ==
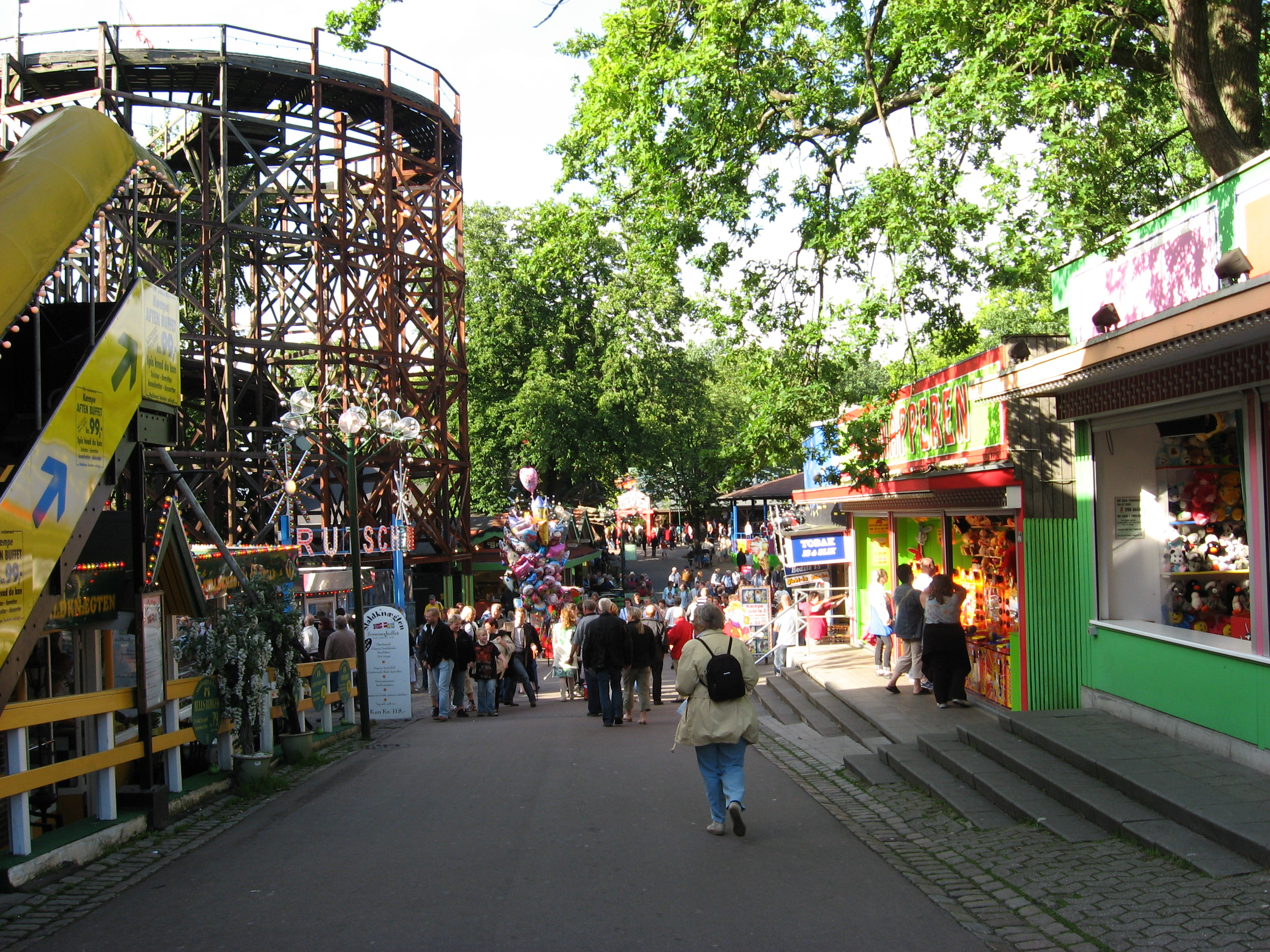
Near the entrance of Rutschebanen

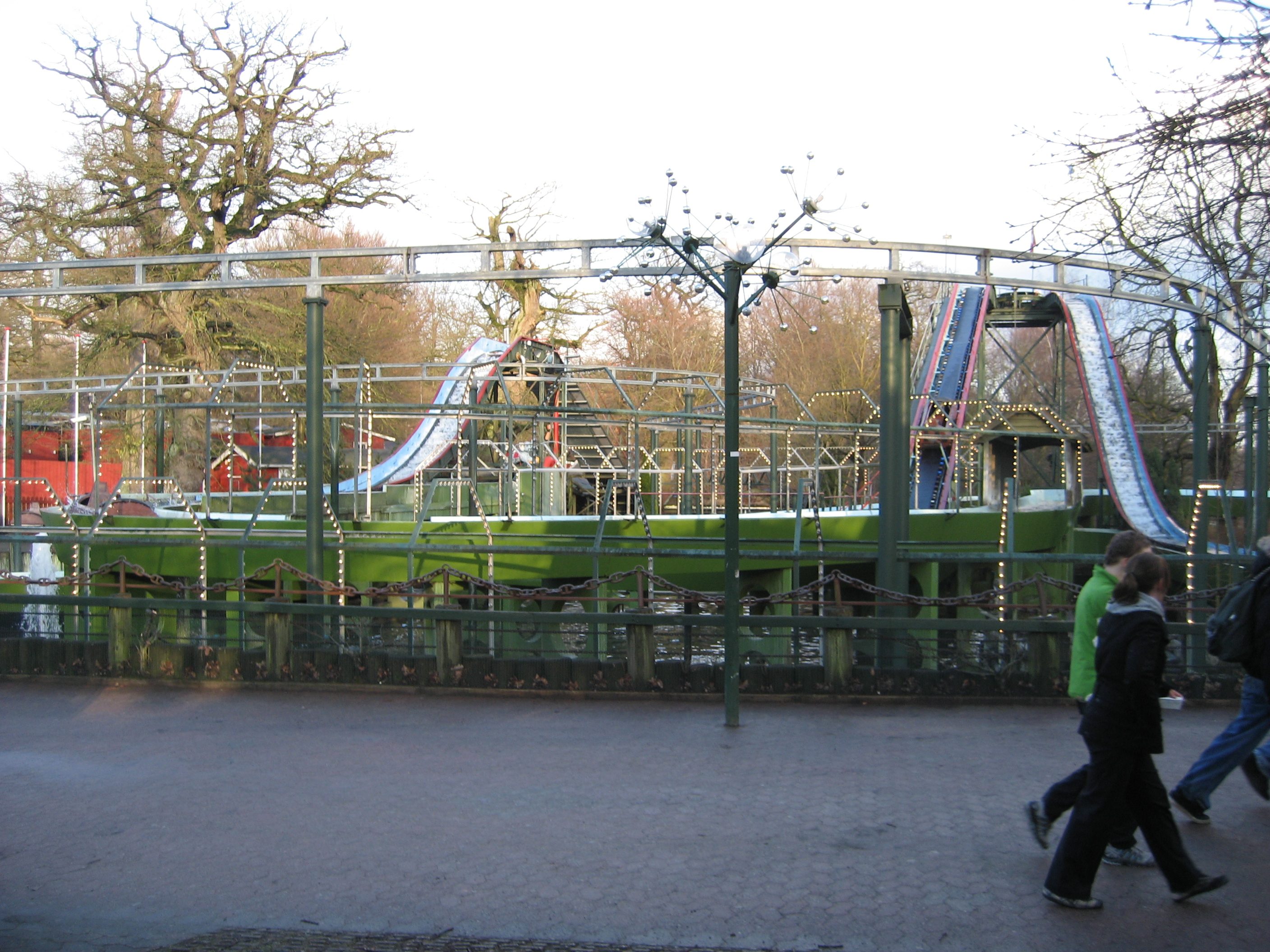
Water ride

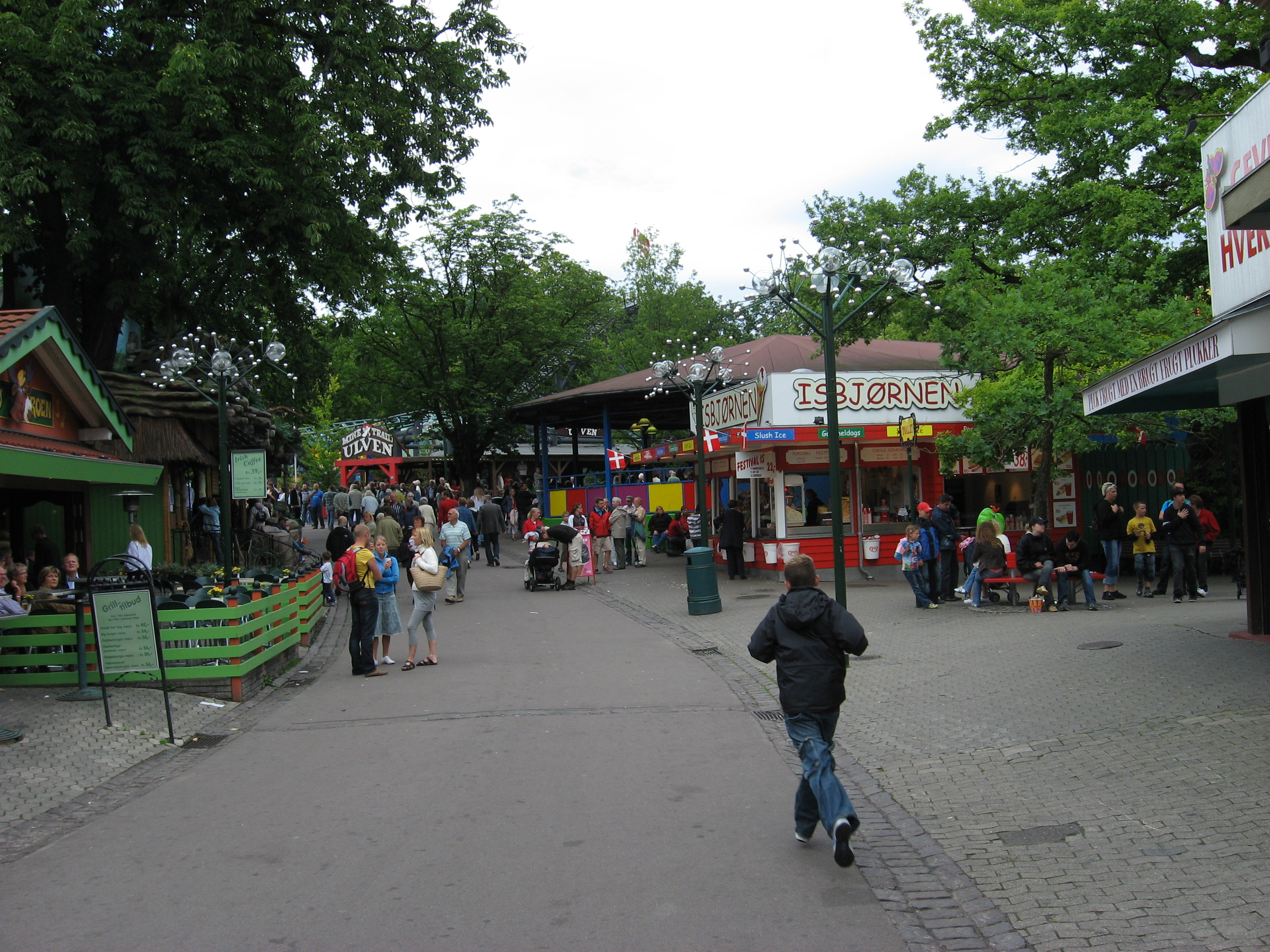
Various restaurants and attractions

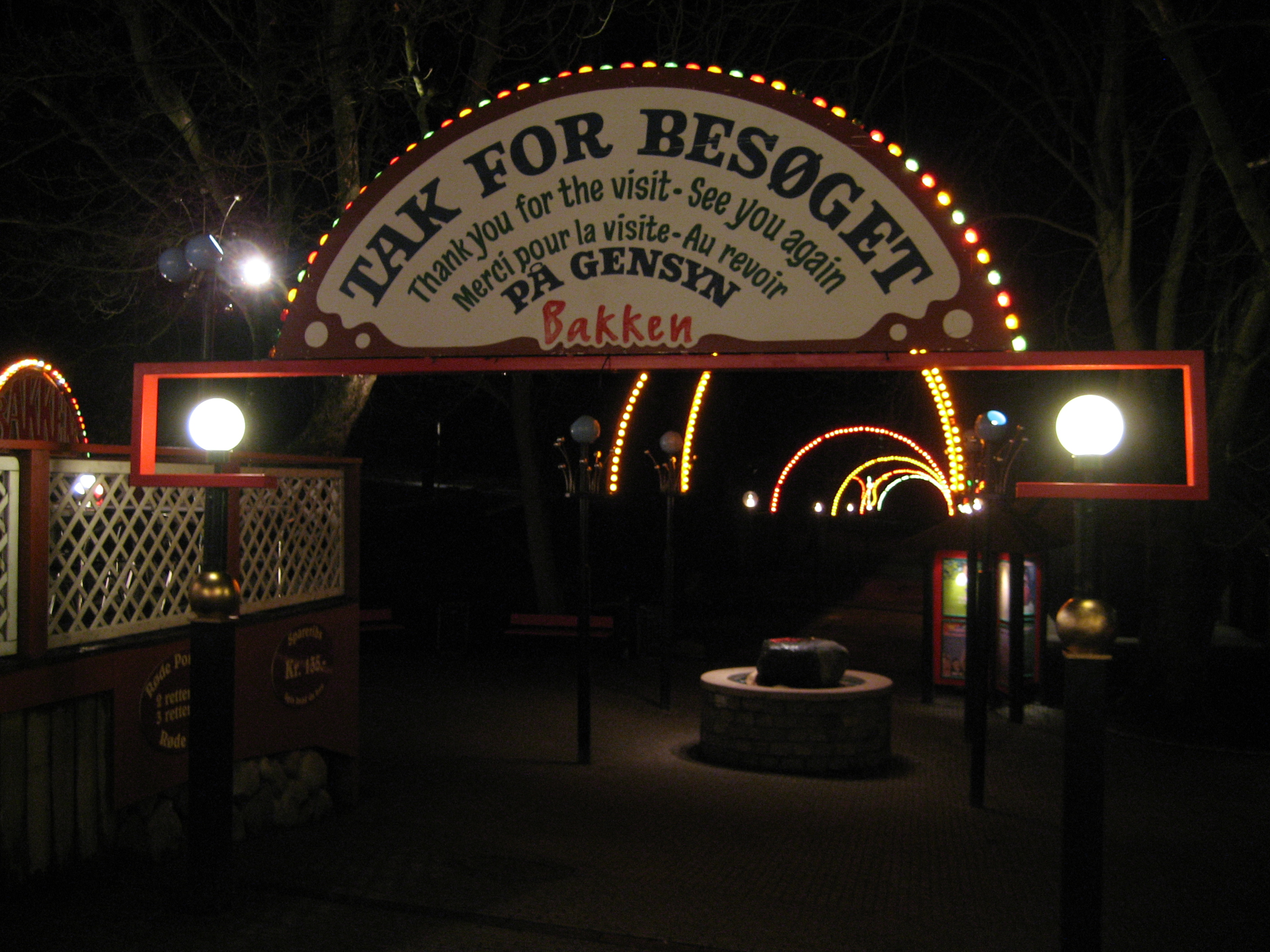
Exit sign

== See also ==
- Tourism in Denmark
