= Asnæs railway station =

Railway station in Northwest Zealand, Denmark

Asnæs
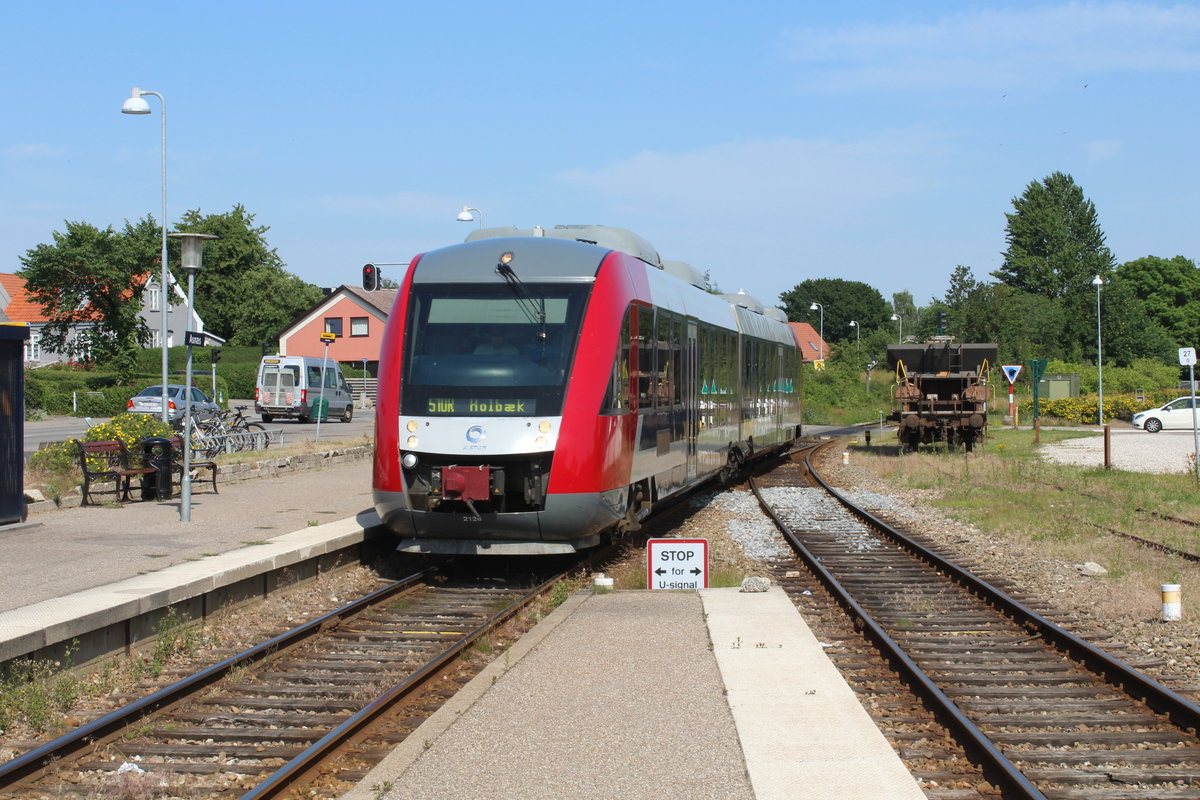
- Asnæs Station in 2019

General information
- Location: Rådhusvej 1; 4550 Asnæs; Odsherred Municipality; Denmark
- Coordinates: 55°48′31.46″N 11°29′59.51″E
- Elevation: 7.2 metres (24 ft)
- Operator: Lokaltog
- Line: Odsherred Line
- Platforms: 2 side platforms
- Tracks: 2

Construction
- Architect: Heinrich Wenck

Other information
- Station code: Asn

History
- Opened: May 17, 1899; 127 years ago

Services
Preceding station	Lokaltog	Following station
Fårevejle towards Holbæk	Odsherred Line Local train	Grevinge towards Nykøbing Sjælland
Location
- Location within Denmark

Asnæs station is a railway station serving the railway town of Asnæs in the Odsherred peninsula in northwest Zealand, Denmark. The station is situated in the southern part of the town.

Asnæs station is located on the Odsherred Line between Holbæk and Nykøbing Sjælland. The station opened in 1899. Its station building was built to designs by the Danish architect Heinrich Wenck. It offers frequent local train services to Nykøbing Sjælland and Holbæk operated by the regional railway company Lokaltog with onward connections from Holbæk to the rest of the Danish rail network.

== History ==
Asnæs station in 1974.

The station opened on 17 May 1899 as one of the original intermediate stations of the Odsherred Line.

== Architecture ==
The original station building from 1899 still exists. It was built to designs by the Danish railway architect Heinrich Wenck (1851–1936), known for the numerous railway stations he designed across Denmark in his capacity of head architect of the Danish State Railways from 1894 to 1921.

== See also ==
- List of railway stations in Denmark
- Rail transport in Denmark
- Transport in Denmark
