= Grevinge railway station =

Railway station in Northwest Zealand, Denmark

Grevinge
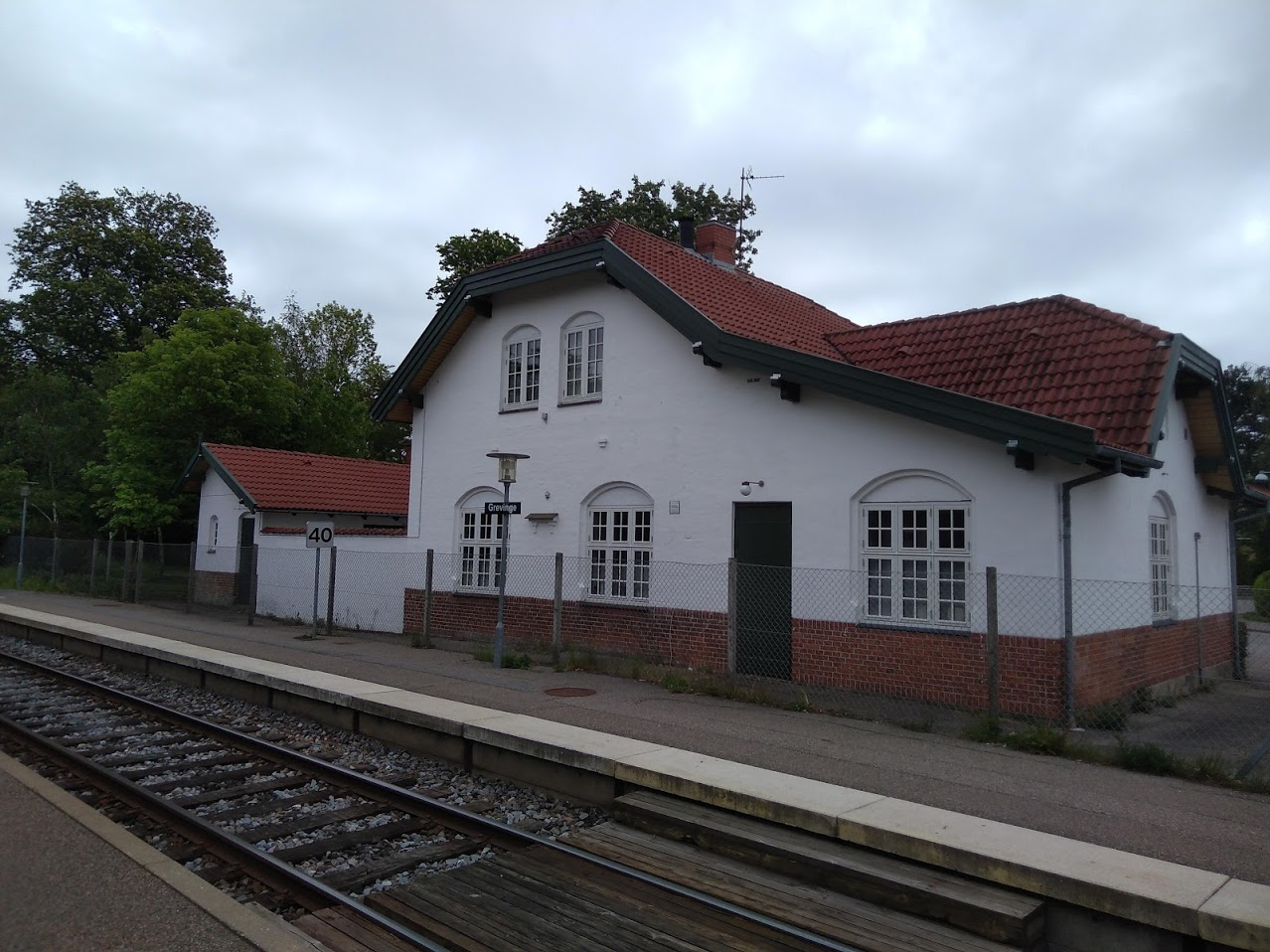
- Grevinge Station in 2019

General information
- Location: Grevinge Stationsvej 1; 4571 Grevinge; Odsherred Municipality; Denmark
- Coordinates: 55°48′10.27″N 11°33′5.04″E
- Elevation: 42.3 metres (139 ft)
- Operator: Lokaltog
- Line: Odsherred Line
- Platforms: 2 side platforms
- Tracks: 2

Construction
- Architect: Heinrich Wenck

Other information
- Station code: Grv

History
- Opened: May 17, 1899; 127 years ago

Services
| Preceding station | Lokaltog | Following station |
|---|---|---|
| Asnæs towards Holbæk | Odsherred Line Local train | Vig towards Nykøbing Sjælland |
Location
- Location within Denmark

Grevinge station is a railway station serving the small railway town of Grevinge in Odsherred, Denmark. The station is situated in the northern part of the town.

Grevinge station is located on the Odsherred Line between Holbæk and Nykøbing Sjælland. The station opened in 1899. Its station building was built to designs by the Danish architect Heinrich Wenck. It offers frequent local train services to Nykøbing Sjælland and Holbæk operated by the regional railway company Lokaltog with onward connections from Holbæk to the rest of the Danish rail network.

== History ==
The station opened on 17 May 1899 as one of the original intermediate stations on the Odsherred Line..

== Architecture ==
The original station building from 1899 still exists. It was built to designs by the Danish railway architect Heinrich Wenck (1851–1936), known for the numerous railway stations he designed across Denmark in his capacity of head architect of the Danish State Railways from 1894 to 1921.

== See also ==
- List of railway stations in Denmark
- Rail transport in Denmark
- Transport in Denmark
