= Højby Sjælland railway station =

Railway station in Northwest Zealand, Denmark

Højby Sjælland
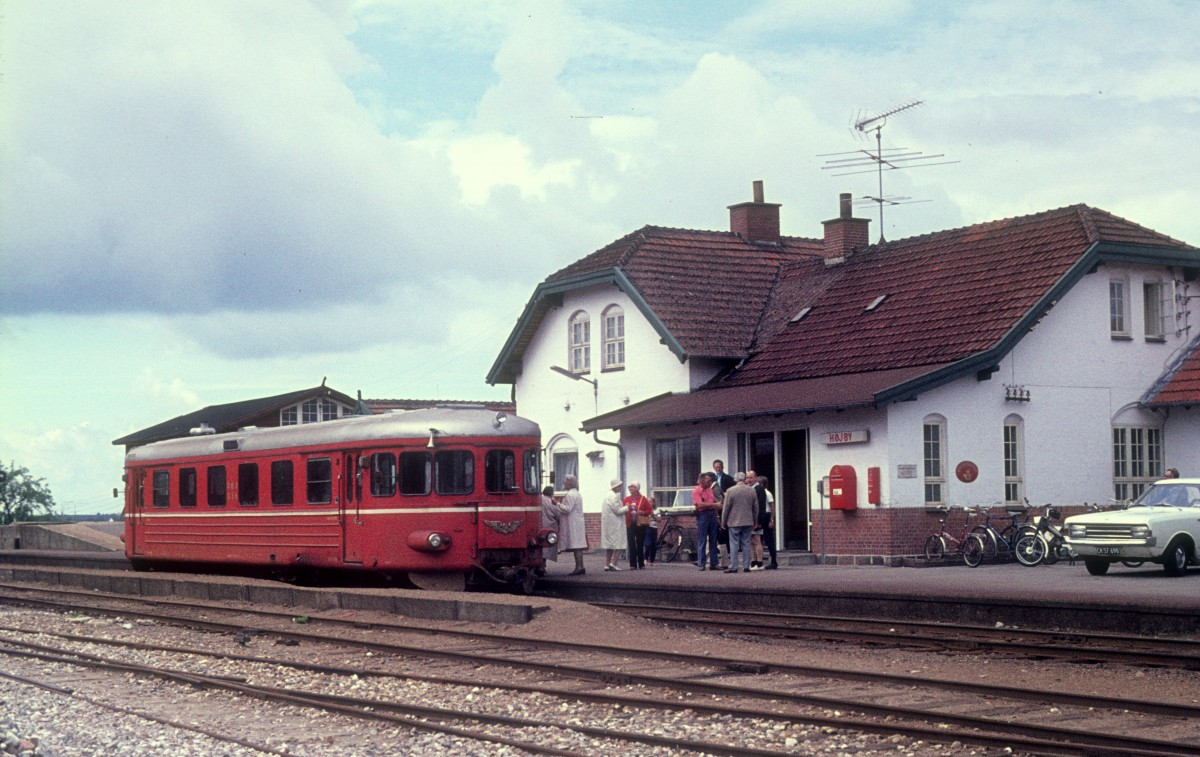
- Højby Sjælland Station in 1974

General information
- Location: Højby Stationsvej 1; 4573 Højby; Odsherred Municipality; Denmark
- Coordinates: 55°54′38″N 11°36′13″E
- Elevation: 16.7 metres (55 ft)
- Operator: Lokaltog
- Line: Odsherred Line
- Platforms: 2
- Tracks: 2

Construction
- Architect: Heinrich Wenck

History
- Opened: 17 May 1899

Services
Preceding station	Lokaltog	Following station
Sommerland Sjælland towards Holbæk	Odsherred Line Local train	Nyled towards Nykøbing Sjælland
Location

Højby Sjælland station is a railway station serving the railway town of Højby in Odsherred, Denmark. The station is situated in the eastern part of the town, close to where the railway line crosses its main artery Højby Hovedgade.

Højby Sjælland station is located on the Odsherred Line between Holbæk and Nykøbing Sjælland. The station opened in 1899 as one of the original intermediate stations on the Odsherred Line. Its station building was built to designs by the Danish architect Heinrich Wenck. It offers frequent local train services to Nykøbing Sjælland and Holbæk operated by the regional railway company Lokaltog with onward connections from Holbæk to the rest of the Danish rail network.

== See also ==
- List of railway stations in Denmark
- Rail transport in Denmark
- Transport in Denmark
