= Nørre Asmindrup railway station =

Railway station in Northwest Zealand, Denmark

Nørre Asmindrup
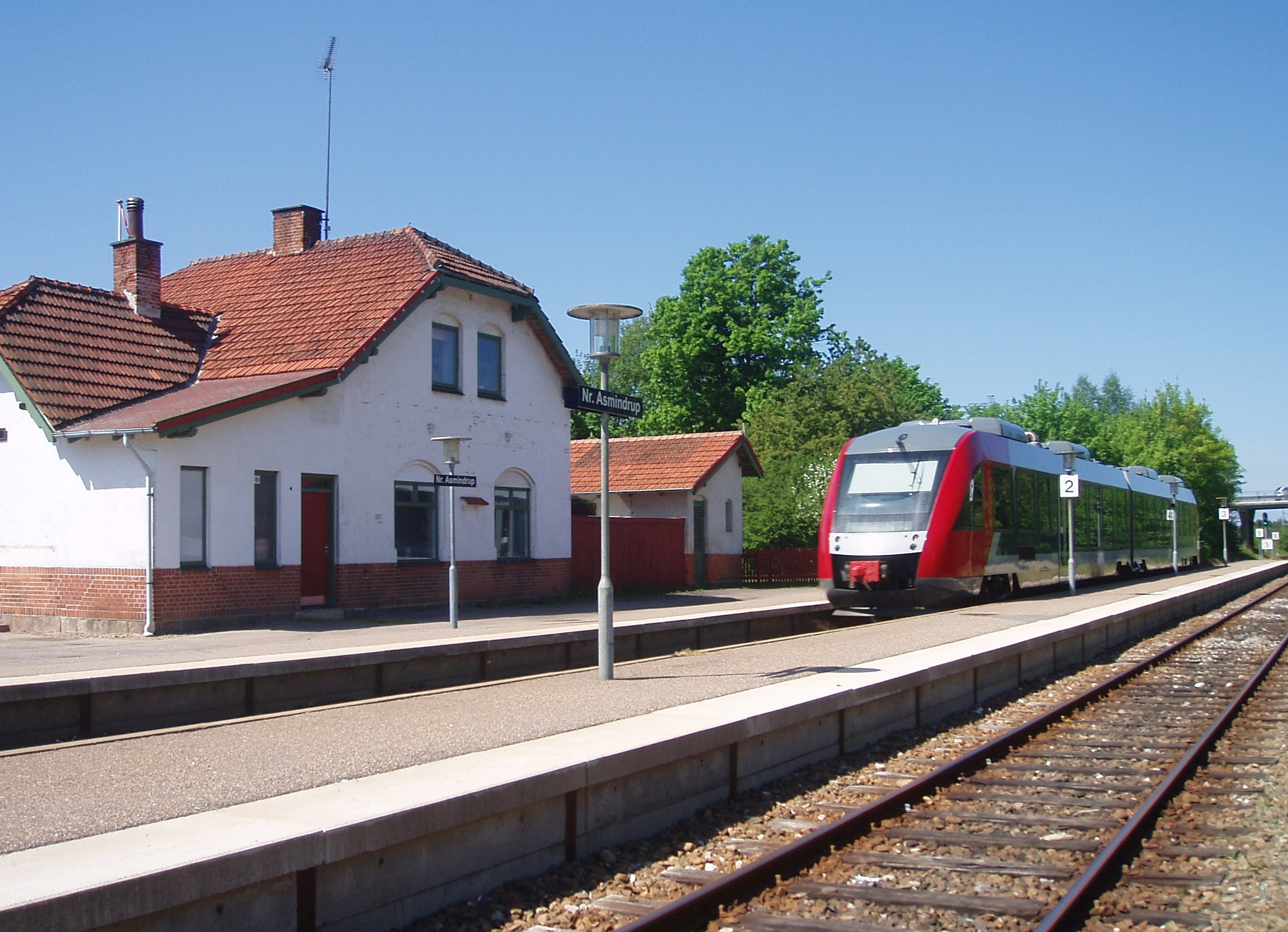
- Nørre Asmindrup Station in 2008

General information
- Location: Jernbanevej 2; 4572 Nørre Asmindrup; Odsherred Municipality; Denmark
- Coordinates: 55°52′59″N 11°36′24″E
- Elevation: 9.9 metres (32 ft)
- Operator: Lokaltog
- Line: Odsherred Line
- Platforms: 2
- Tracks: 2

Construction
- Architect: Heinrich Wenck

Other information
- Station code: Nam

History
- Opened: 17 May 1899

Services
Preceding station	Lokaltog	Following station
Vig towards Holbæk	Odsherred Line Local train	Sommerland Sjælland towards Nykøbing Sjælland
Location
- Location within Denmark

Nørre Asmindrup station is a railway station serving the railway town of Nørre Asmindrup in Odsherred, Denmark. The station is situated in the central part of the town, where the railway line crosses its main artery Gammel Nykøbingvej.

Nørre Asmindrup station is located on the Odsherred Line between Holbæk and Nykøbing Sjælland. The station opened in 1899 as one of the original intermediate stations on the Odsherred Line. Its station building was built to designs by the Danish architect Heinrich Wenck. It offers frequent local train services to Nykøbing Sjælland and Holbæk operated by the regional railway company Lokaltog with onward connections from Holbæk to the rest of the Danish rail network.

== History ==
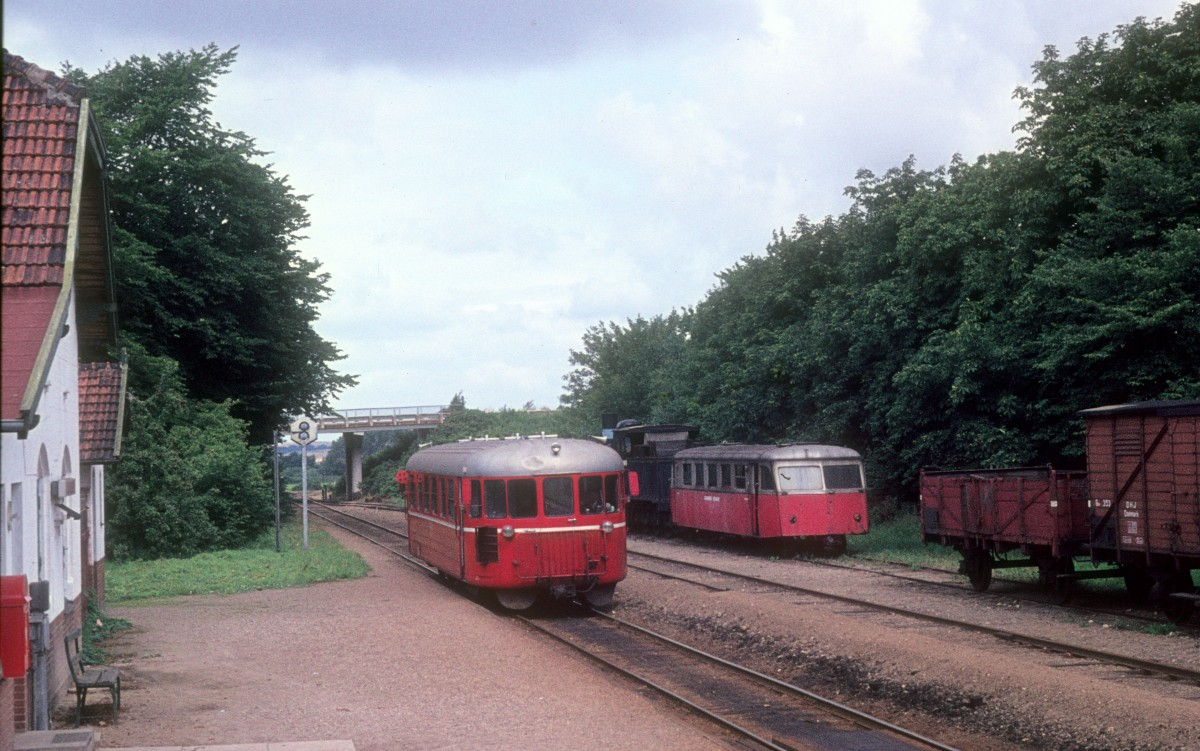
Railcar at Nørre Asmindrup station in 1974.

The station opened on 17 May 1899 as one of the original intermediate stations on the Odsherred Line. The station was built near the village of Svinninge, but to avoid confusion with another Svinninge station, also on the Odsherred Line, the station was named after the nearby village of Nørre Asmindrup. The two villages have today grown together into one, which from 2012 is called Nørre Asmindrup.

== See also ==
- List of railway stations in Denmark
- Rail transport in Denmark
- Transport in Denmark
