= Dragsholm Castle =

Historic building in Zealand, Denmark

Coordinates: 55°46′18″N 11°23′27″E

Dragsholm
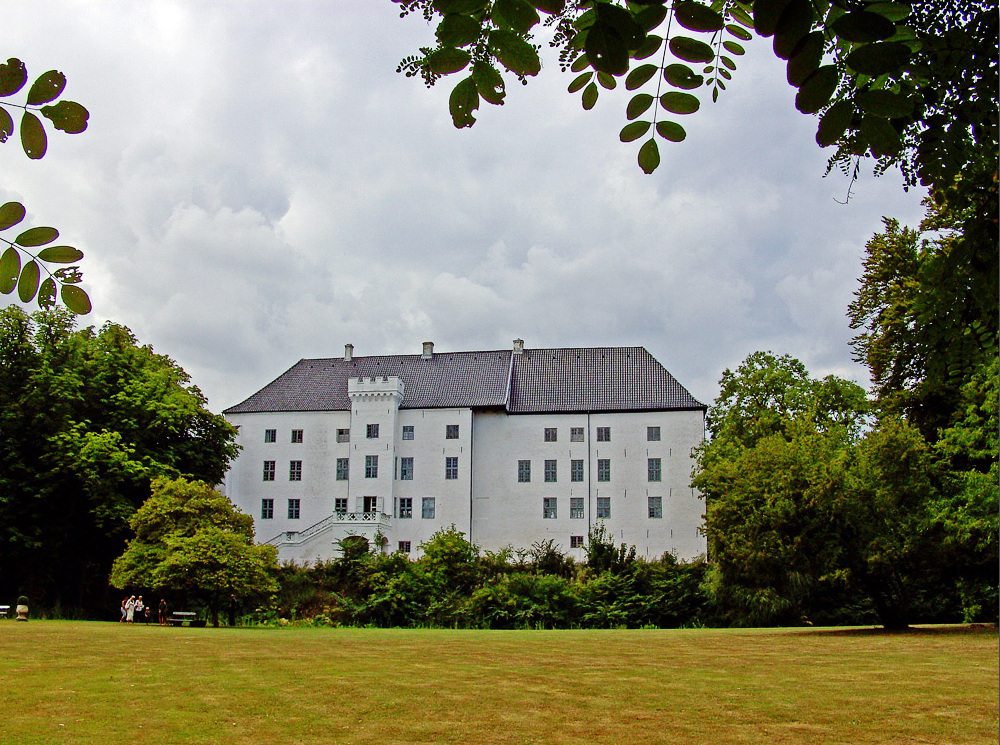
- Interactive map of the Dragsholm area

General information
- Architectural style: Baroque
- Location: Dragsholm, Odsherred, Zealand, Denmark
- Client: Peder Sunesen (original); Frederik Christian Adeler (current building)

Dragsholm Castle (Danish: Dragsholm Slot) is a historic building in Zealand, Denmark.

For about 800 years there has been a building on the islet by the “drag”. From the original palace over the medieval castle to the current baroque style, Dragsholm Castle has had an influence on and been influenced by changing times and the surrounding community. Today, Dragsholm Castle has restaurant and hotel facilities.

== The name Dragsholm ==
Prior to the reclamation of the Lammefjord, Odsherred was connected to the rest of Zealand by a narrow strip of land, known as a ”draugh” or ”drag”, located east of Dragsholm where the mill, Dragsmølle, lies today. The Vikings could drag their ships across the strip of land and then sail through to Roskilde, avoiding the dangerous waters north of Zealand. The islet on which Dragsholm Castle was built is surrounded by lakes and meadows just south of the terminal moraine, which ends at Vejrhøj (123 m) to the north. Consequently, Dragsholm means the islet by the ”drag”.

== History ==
=== Early history ===
Dragsholm Slot is one of the oldest secular buildings in Denmark. The original Dragsholm Castle was built around 1215 by the Bishop of Roskilde. During the Middle Ages, the building was modified from the original palace to a fortified castle. During the Count's Feud (1534–36) (Grevens Fejde) it was so strong that it was the only castle on Zealand to withstand the armies of Count Christoffer.

=== Crownland and prison, 1536–1664 ===
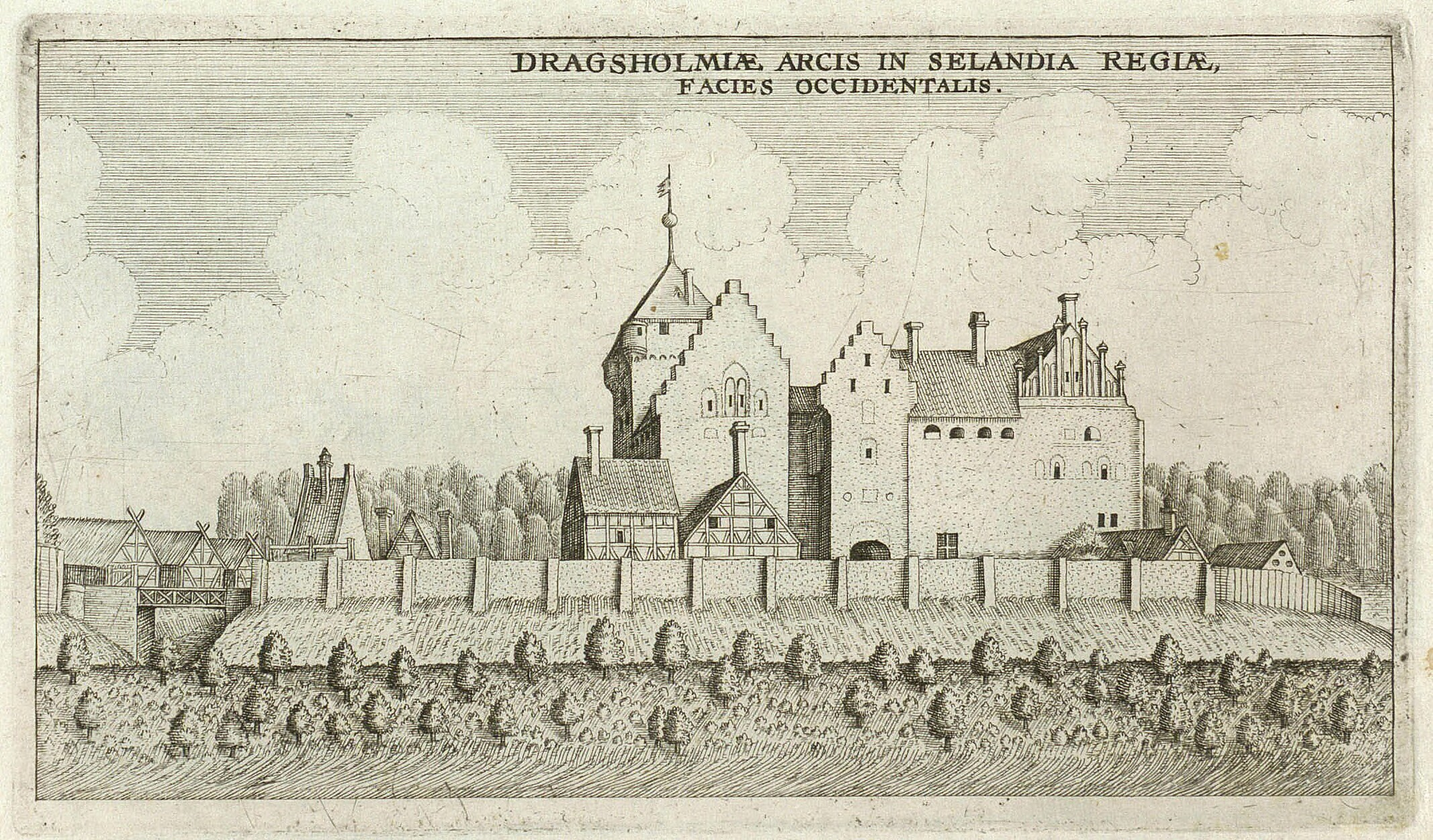
Dragsholm in 1677.

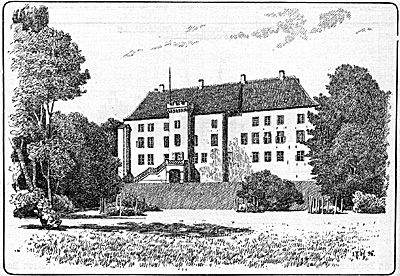
Dragsholm Castle in 1896

In connection with the Reformation, Dragsholm was confiscated by the Crown along with all other property of the Catholic church. As Crownland during the period from 1536 to 1664, Dragsholm Castle was used as a prison for noble and ecclesiastical prisoners. In the large tower at the northeast corner of the medieval castle, prison cells were made and equipped with toilets and windows depending on the prisoner's crimes, behaviour and the seriousness of his insults towards the King.

Some of the best known prisoners at Dragsholm Castle include: the last Catholic Bishop in Roskilde and former owner of the castle, Joachim Rønnow; The 4th Earl of Bothwell (briefly known, during most of 1567, as the 1st Duke of Orkney), third husband of Mary, Queen of Scots; and the seemingly raving mad squire, Ejler Brockenhuus.

=== Baroque castle ===
During the wars against Charles X Gustav of Sweden, an attempt was made to blow up Dragsholm Castle, and the place was a ruin until the King, as part payment of his outstanding debts, gave the castle to royal treasurer Heinrich Müller, and he started the restoration.

In 1694, Dragsholm Castle was sold to the nobleman Frederik Christian Adeler (1668-1726) and finally rebuilt as the baroque castle we see today. Several owners from that family have made a lasting imprint on the development, including G. F. O. Zytphen Adeler, who took the initiative to drain the Lammefjord. The Adeler Family lost its wealth in 1932 as the Danmarks bank collapsed and Dragsholm Castle passed over to the Central Land Board which sold the place to J.F. Bøttger, but only with the land belonging to the main estate.

== Architecture ==
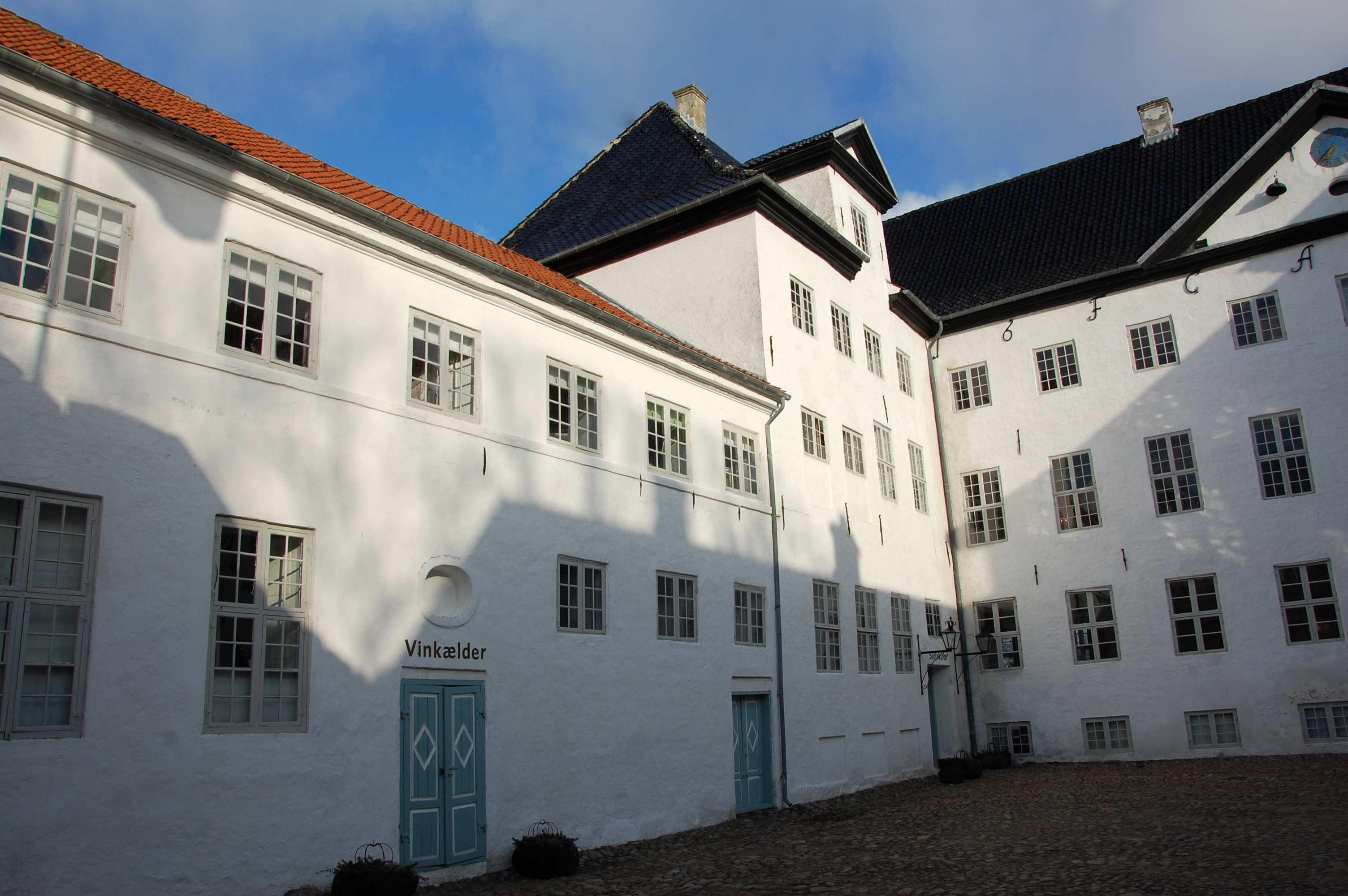
Dragsholm courtyard in 2009

Today, the baroque style of the castle remains intact, but the interior of the Castle has been subject to restorations and modernisations over the years. The most recent major restoration took place after the first world war, where the Baron aimed for a Late Romantic Style, which still prevails in the salons and ballrooms.

== Hauntings ==
Witnesses and psychics have claimed that there are three ghosts who are residents at the castle: a grey lady, a white lady and Lord Bothwell. The Earl is said to ride through the courtyard with a full horse and carriage.

== Dragsholm Castle today ==
In recent years, the Bøttger family has managed the running of the castle after a number of minor restorations, which in addition to general conservation of the building has had the purpose of raising the level of quality of the castle as a hotel, restaurant and attraction. The hotel rooms at the castle have been refurbished and modernised, and more rooms have been added in the porter's lodge on the other side of the moat.

== List of owners ==
- ( -1536) The Bishopric of Roskilde
- (1536-1664) The Crown
- (1664-1682) Henrik Müller
- (1688-1694) Manuel de Texeira
- (1694-1726) Frederik Christian Adeler
- (1726-1727) Estate of Frederik Christian von Adeler
- (1727-1757) Christian von Lente Adeler
- (1757-1785) Conrad Wilhelm Adeler
- (1785-1816) Frederik Adeler
- (1816-1839) Bertha Adeler, née Moltke
- (1839-1878) Georg Frederik Otto Zytphen-Adeler
- (1878-1908) Frederik Herman Christian de Falsen Zytphen-Adeler
- (1908-1932) Georg Frederik de Falsen Zytphen-Adeler
- (1932-1936) The Zytphen-Adeler family
- (1936) The National Land Law Committee
- (1936-1985) Johan Frederik Bøttger
- (1985-2002) Flemming Frederik Bøttger
- (2002- ) Inge Merete and Peter Bøttger

== See also ==
- List of ghosts
- Bøstrup (manor house)

== Sources and external links ==
- Dragsholm Castle official website
- History of Dragsholm Castle official website
- Ellingelyng.dk (Odsherred history website): Dragsholm Castle: history and images (in Danish)
- Dragsholm Castle in Guide to Denmark
