= Vig, Denmark =

Vig
- Railway town
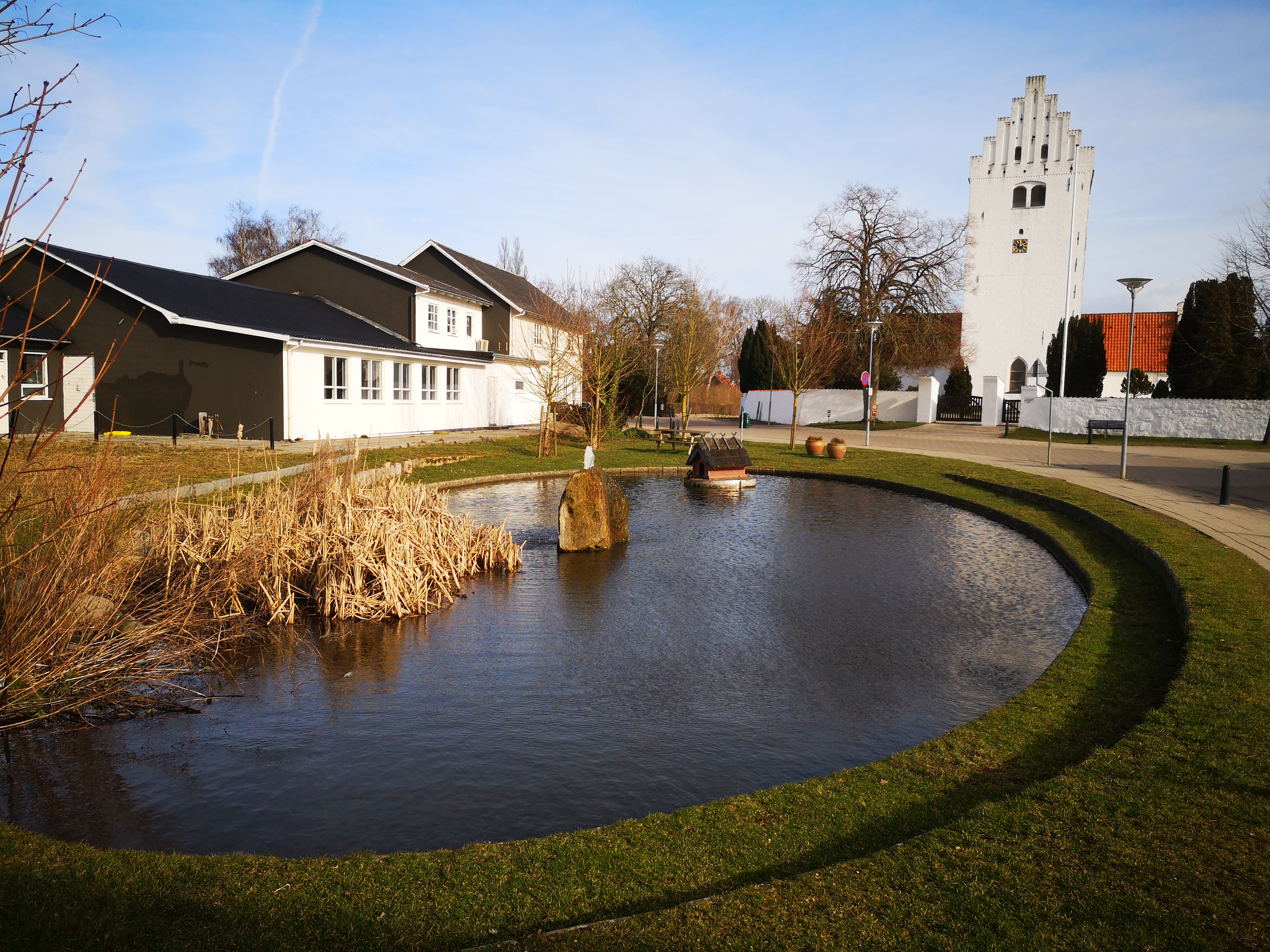
- Vig Church

- Location in Region Zealand Vig (Denmark)
- Coordinates: 55°51′06″N 11°34′53″E
- Country: Denmark
- Region: Region Zealand
- Municipality: Odsherred Municipality

Area
  - Urban: 1.2 km^{2} (0.46 sq mi)

Population (2026)
  - Urban: 1,720
  - Urban density: 1,400/km^{2} (3,700/sq mi)
- Time zone: UTC+1 (CET)
  - Summer (DST): UTC+2 (CEST)
- Postal code: DK-4560 Vig

Vig is a railway town in Odsherred on the island of Zealand, Denmark. As of 1 January 2026, Vig has a population of 1,720.

Vig Church is located in the town which hosts an annual music festival, the Vig Festival.

Vig is located on the Danish national road 21 and is served by Vig railway station on the Odsherred railway line between Nykøbing Sjælland and Holbæk.
