= Asnæs =

- Town
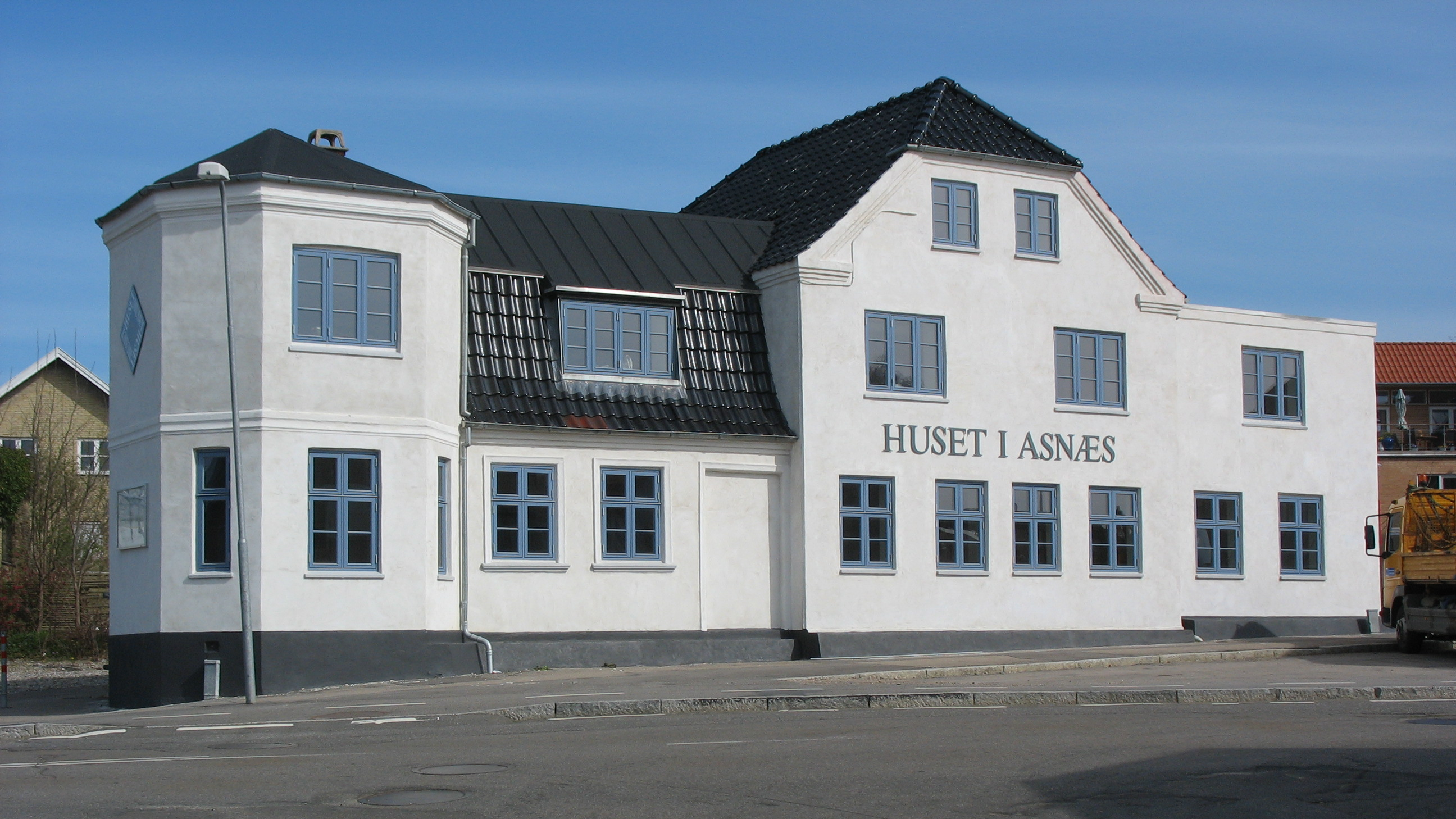
- The house in Asnæs - a cultural place

- Location in Denmark Asnæs (Denmark Region Zealand)
- Coordinates: 55°48′51″N 11°29′55″E
- Country: Denmark
- Region: Region Zealand
- Municipality: Odsherred

Area
  - Urban: 2.23 km^{2} (0.86 sq mi)

Population (2026)
  - Urban: 3,048
  - Urban density: 1,370/km^{2} (3,540/sq mi)
  - Gender: 1,433 males and 1,615 females
- Time zone: UTC+1 (CET)
  - Summer (DST): UTC+2 (CEST)
- Postal code: DK-4550 Asnæs

Asnæs is a town in Odsherred Municipality in northwestern Zealand in Denmark. It is situated approximately 90 kilometres west of Copenhagen and has a population of 3,048 (1. January 2026).

The town is home to a swimming hall, a sports hall, Asnæs Skole folkeskole, Asnæs Centret shopping center, Odsherred Gymnasium, and a large production site for NKT Cables.

== Transport ==
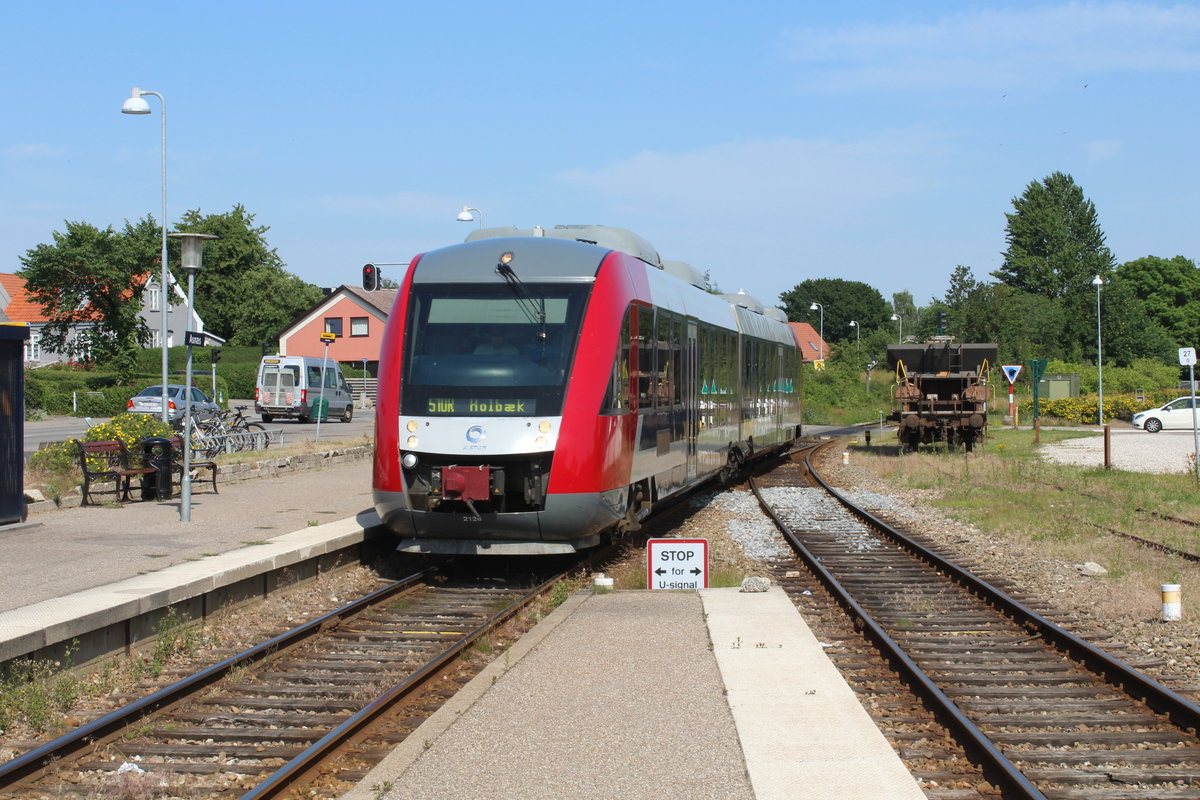
Asnæs railway station in 2019.

Asnæs is situated close to the Danish national road 21. It has a railway station on the Odsherred Railway Line, terminating in Holbæk and connecting to trains to Copenhagen.

== Notable people ==
- Christian Poulsen (born 1980 in Asnæs) a Danish former footballer, winning 454 club caps; regular member of the Denmark national football team with 92 caps
