= Trundholm Municipality =

Municipality in West Zealand Count

Coordinates: 55°20′15″N 10°26′10″E

Trundholm municipality was a municipality (Danish, kommune) in West Zealand County on the northwest coast of the island of Zealand (Sjælland) in Denmark, in a region or landscape known as Odsherred. The municipality covered an area of 163 km², and had a total population of 11,309 (2005). Its last mayor was Hans Møller Olsen, a member of the Venstre (Liberal Party) political party.

The main town and the site of its municipal council was the town of Højby.

Because the former municipality of Trundholm is located near the end of a peninsula and because it features a long spit of land, Zealand's Point (Sjællands Odde), at its northwest which stretches out into the Kattegat, it is surrounded by much water. Two former municipalities — Nykøbing-Rørvig to the northeast and Dragsholm to the southwest— are also on this peninsula. To the east is Nykøbing Bay (Nykøbing Bugt), an inlet of the larger Isefjord, to the north is Nyrup Bay (Nyrup Bugt) and Hesselø Bay (Hesselø Bugt), to the west of the point is the Kattegat, and to the south of the point is Sejerø Bay (Sejerø Bugt).

Ferry service via Mols-linien connects the former municipality at the town of Sjællands Odde northwest over the Kattegat to the Danish mainland, the Jutland peninsula, at Århus and Ebeltoft.

By 1 January 2007 Trundholm municipality ceased to exist, as the result of Kommunalreformen ("The Municipality Reform" of 2007). It merged with existing Dragsholm and Nykøbing-Rørvig municipalities to form the new Odsherred municipality. This created a municipality with an area of 355 km² and a total population of 32,739 (2005). The new municipality belongs to the Region Sjælland ("Zealand Region").
