= Nykøbing-Rørvig Municipality =

Former Danish municipality

Coordinates: 55°55′53″N 11°39′43″E

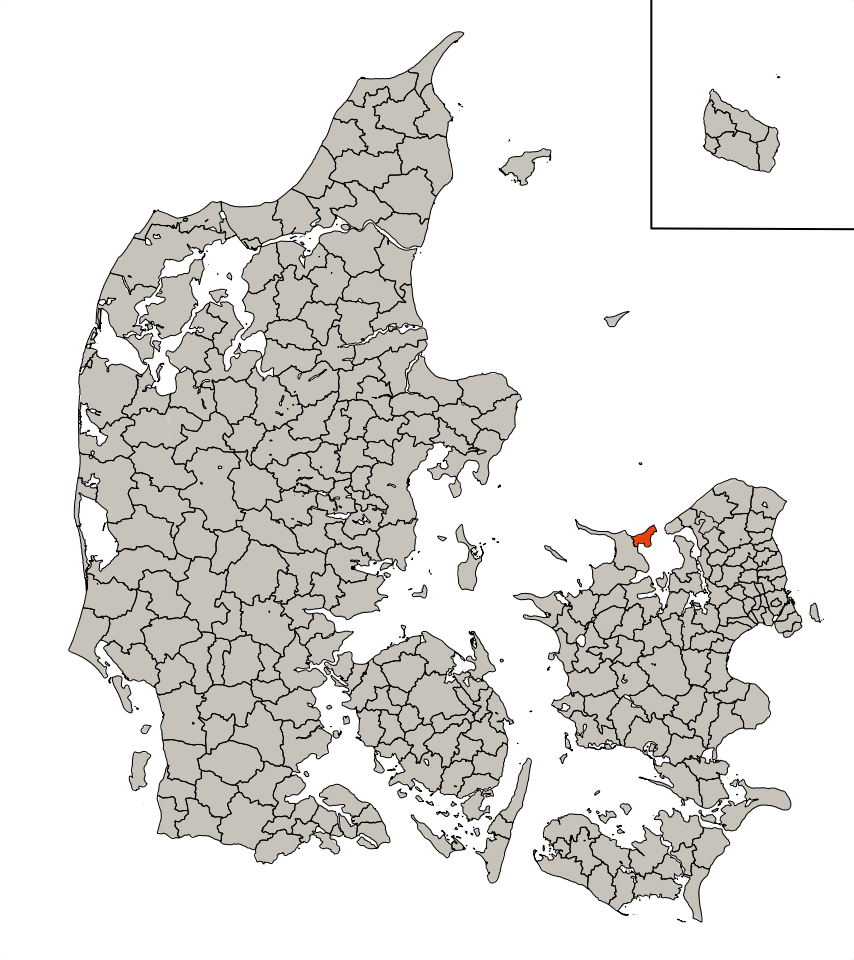
Nykøbing-Rørvig Municipality's location in Denmark.

Until 1 January 2007 Nykøbing-Rørvig municipality was a municipality (Danish, kommune) in the former West Zealand County on the northwest coast of the island of Zealand (Sjælland) in Denmark, at the mouth of the Isefjord. The municipality covered an area of 40 km^{2} (15 sq mi), and had a total population of 7,610 (2005). Its last mayor was Vagn Ytte Larsen, a member of the Social Democrats (Socialdemokraterne) political party. The site of its municipal council is the town of Nykøbing Sjælland.

To the northwest of the former municipality is Nyrup Bay (Nyrup Bugt) and Hesselø Bay (Hesselø Bugt), to the east is the Isefjord, and to the southeast is Nykøbing Bay (Nykøbing Bugt).

Nykøbing-Rørvig municipality ceased to exist, as the result of Kommunalreformen ("The Municipality Reform" of 2007). It was merged with existing Dragsholm and Trundholm municipalities to form the new Odsherred municipality. This created a municipality with an area of 355 km^{2} (137 sq mi) and a total population of 32,739 (2005). The new municipality belongs to Region Sjælland ("Zealand Region").
