= Clemens Petersen =

Danish esthetician and critic

Clemens Petersen (2 October 1834 – 21 May 1918) was a Danish esthetician, theatre critic and literary critic. He was born in the parish Asminderup in Odsherred, Zealand. In his position as theatre critic and literary critic for Fædrelandet he had a significant influence on public opinion, and is also credited for helping the approval of Bjørnstjerne Bjørnson in Denmark. Among his publications is Dramaturgisk Kritik from 1860, and Forholdet mellem det gamle og det ny ved Oehlenschläger's Fremtræden (1867). Petersen left Denmark in 1868 and settled in North America. He contributed to various periodica, including Heimdal (Chicago) and Nordlyset (New York). He returned to Denmark in 1904, and died in Copenhagen in 1918.
