= Fårevejle Stationsby =

- Town
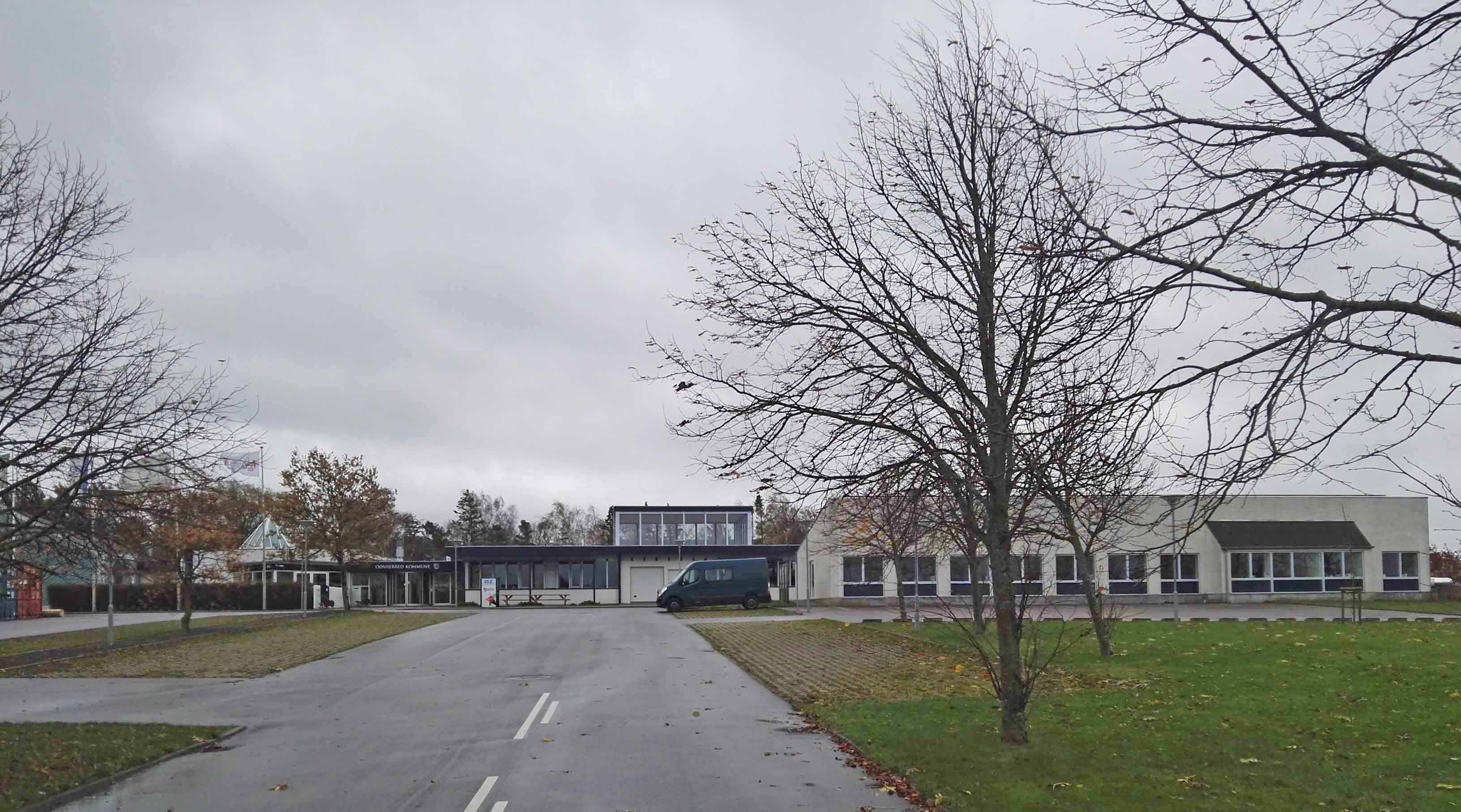
- The former town hall of Dragsholm Municipality

- Location in Region Zealand Fårevejle Stationsby (Denmark)
- Coordinates: 55°47′08″N 11°27′55″E
- Country: Denmark
- Region: Region Zealand
- Municipality: Odsherred Municipality

Area
  - Urban: 1.2 km^{2} (0.46 sq mi)

Population (2026)
  - Urban: 1,796
  - Urban density: 1,500/km^{2} (3,900/sq mi)
- Time zone: UTC+1 (CET)
  - Summer (DST): UTC+2 (CEST)
- Postal code: DK-4540 Fårevejle

Fårevejle Stationsby (lit. 'Fårevejle station town') is a small railway town in the Odsherred peninsula in the northwestern part of the island of Zealand, Denmark. As of 1 January 2026, Fårevejle Stationsby has a population of 1,796. Fårevejle Stationsby is located in Fårevejle Parish in Odsherred Municipality in Region Zealand.

The town is located on a former small island in a now reclamed branch of the Lammefjorden polder. It developed around Fårevejle railway station which opened in 1899 and grew up where the Odsherred railway line intersects that main road across the former seabed. The original village of Fårevejle, now known as Fårevejle Kirkeby (lit. 'Fårevejle church town') is located c. 3.5 km (2.2 mi) to the northwest of Fårevejle Stationsby.

The town was the seat of the former Dragsholm Municipality.

== Gallery ==
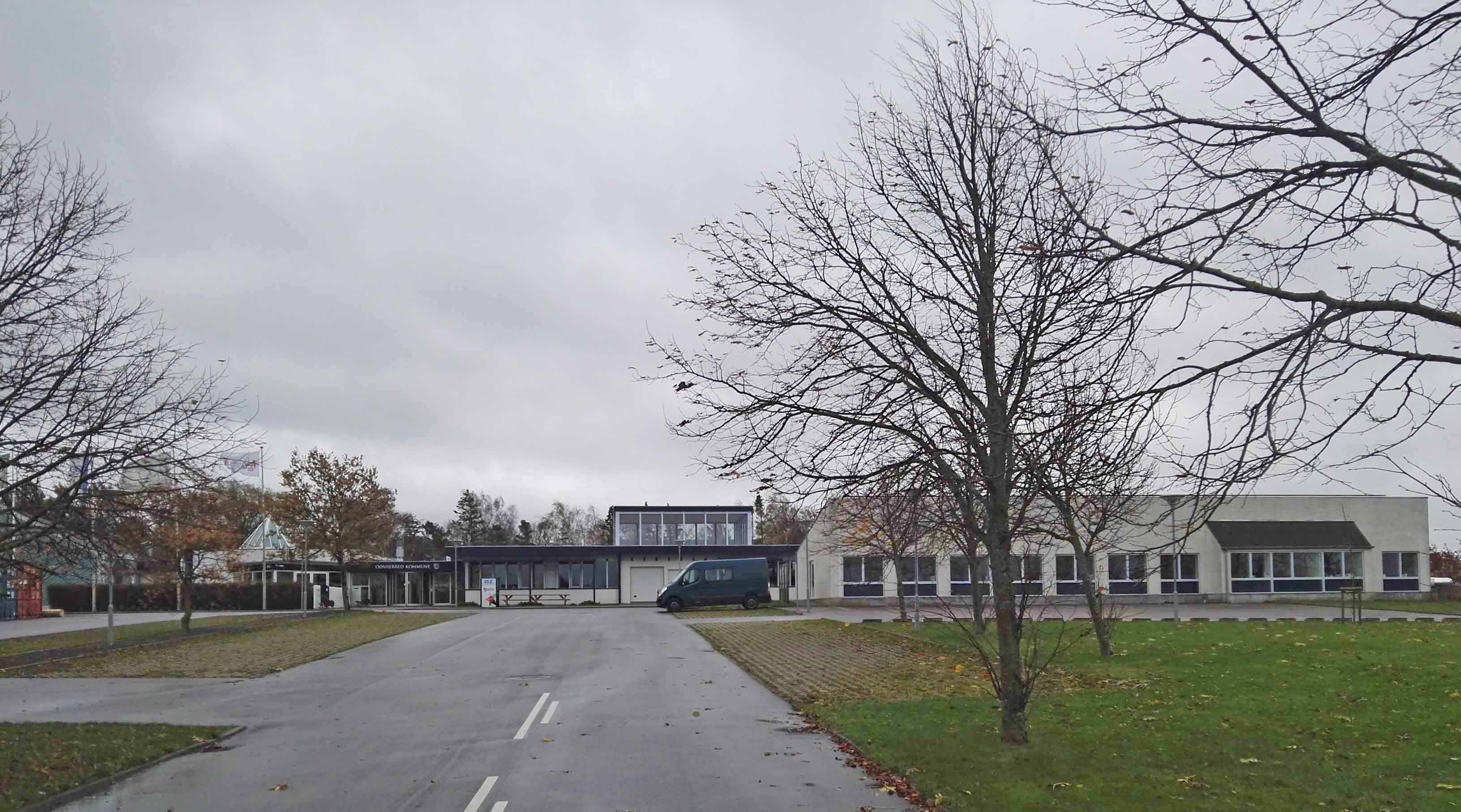
The former town hall of Dragsholm Municipality in 2019

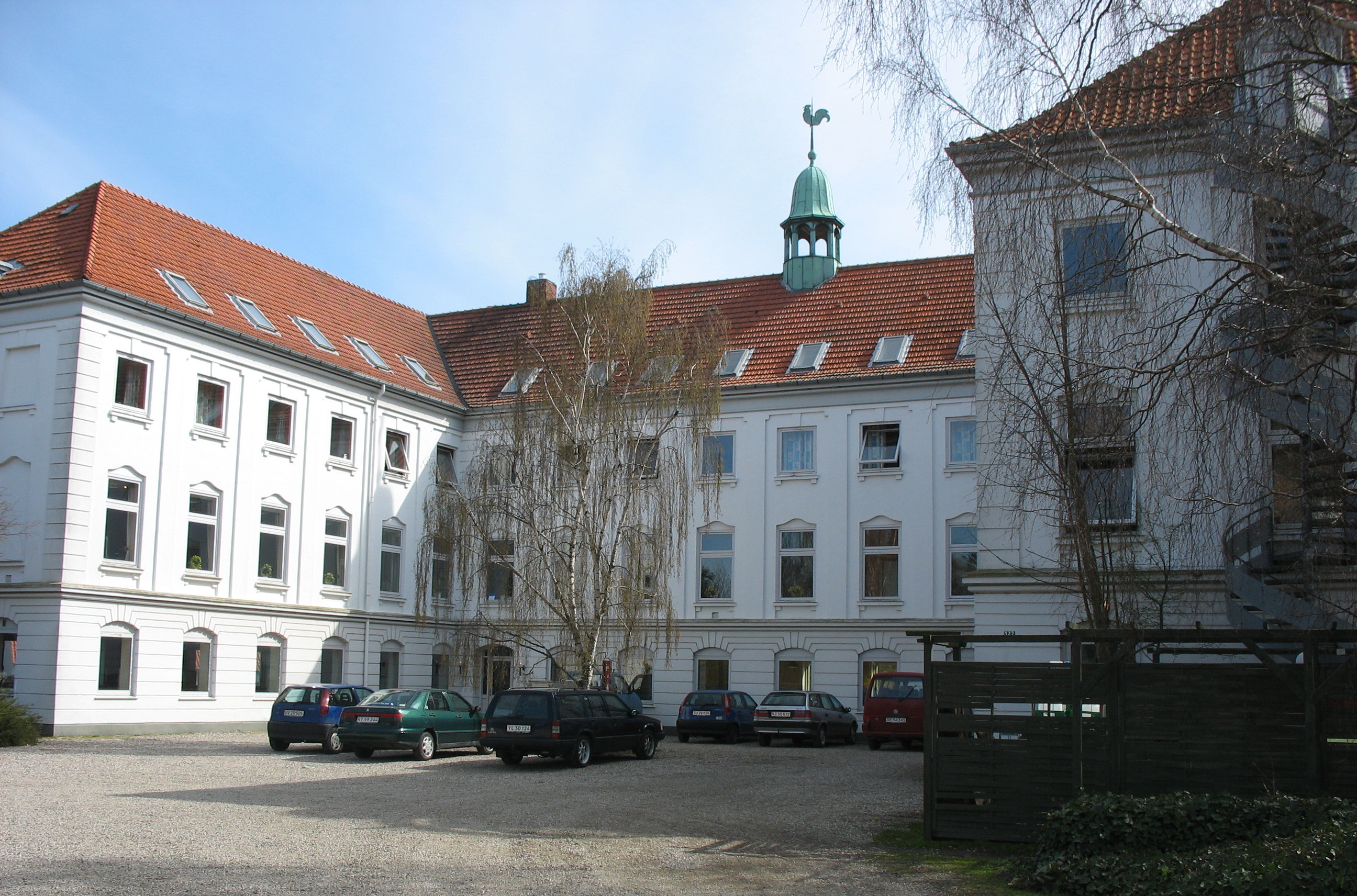
Odsherred Efterskole in 2007

Fårevejle railway station in 1974
