= Dragsholm Municipality =

Former municipality in Denmark

Coordinates: 55°48′12″N 11°26′32″E

Until 1 January 2007 Dragsholm municipality was a municipality (Danish, kommune) in West Zealand County on the northwest coast of the island of Zealand (Sjælland) in Denmark, in a region known as Lammefjord, named after the inlet to the east of the municipality . The municipality covered an area of 152 km^{2} (59 sq mi), and had a total population of 13,820 (2005). Its last mayor was Finn Madsen, a member of the Social Democrats (Socialdemokraterne) political party. Its municipal seat was the town of Fårevejle Stationsby.

The area is a popular summer home and beach area. Many people travel through the area on their way to Zealand's Point (Sjællands Odde), a long spit of land north of the municipality from where ferry service via Mols-linien connects Zealand to the Danish mainland, the Jutland peninsula, at Århus and Ebeltoft.

Dragsholm municipality ceased to exist as the result of Kommunalreformen ("The Municipality Reform" of 2007). It was merged with Nykøbing-Rørvig and Trundholm municipalities to form the new Odsherred municipality. This created a municipality with an area of 355 km^{2} (137 sq mi) and a total population of 32,739 (2005). The new municipality belong to Region Sjælland ("Zealand Region").
