= Ise Fjord =

Fjord in Zealand, Denmark

- Isefjorden (Danish)
- Aerial view of Ise Fjord

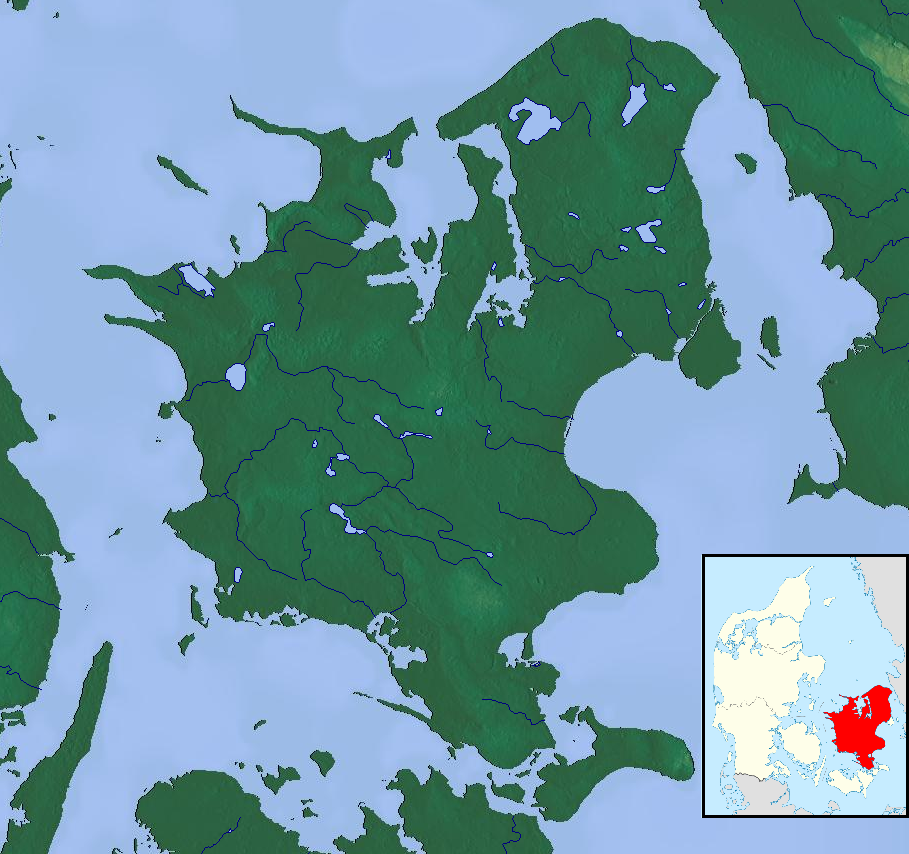
- Location in Zealand Ise Fjord (Denmark) Ise Fjord (Europe)
- Coordinates: 55.85°N 11.8°E
- Type: fjord
- Ocean/sea sources: Atlantic Ocean
- Basin countries: Denmark

Ise Fjord (Danish: Isefjorden) is a deeply branched arm of the sea into the Danish island Zealand. From its relatively narrow entrance from the Kattegat at Hundested and Rørvig, branches of Ise Fjord stretch 35 km inland and divide the northern part of Zealand into the peninsulas of Odsherred, Hornsherred, and Nordsjælland.

Some branches have names of their own, such as Roskilde Fjord which joins Ise Fjord proper close to its northern end, Lejre Vig in Lejre Municipality just west of Roskilde harbor, Holbæk Fjord, and the now drained Lammefjord and Sidinge Fjord at the west. The depth of the water in the fjord averages 5 to 7 meters, the deepest areas being those on the western side of Orø. Salinity is from 1.6 to 2.2%.

== Flora ==
The banks of Ise Fjord are full of interesting flowers and plants. The river valley of Ejby north of Roskilde near Ise Fjord is a nature reserve with many rare plants.

== The Ise Fjord workshop ==
Ise Fjord is also remembered for its 15th-century artists who decorated many of the region's churches with frescoes (kalkmalerier) depicting stories from the Old and New Testaments. A good example is Tuse Church near Holbæk in northwestern Sealand, which is richly decorated with both Romanesque and late Gothic murals. Here the life of Jesus is particularly interesting as it combines the biblical accounts with images of kings, devils, and women brewing beer.
