= Road traffic in Denmark =

Simple traffic instructions border sign, at the Danish bordering; presented to motorists entering Denmark.

This article contains the guidelines for road traffic in Denmark.

== Vehicular ==
In Denmark all driving traffic must use right side lanes. Cars and motorcycles must use low beam light (not parking light) at all times of the day. In a car, all persons must wear seat belt. On motorways and "if necessary" on other roads, turning signal must be used when changing lanes.

Unless signs show other speed limit, the limit is 50 km/h in towns, 80 km/h outside towns and 130 on motorways (shown on signs). Trucks, buses and vehicles with trailers may not go faster than 70 km/h outside towns, except on motorways, where 80 is allowed.

=== Licensing ===
Drivers Licence: A1 and A2 is for small/large motorbike. B is for cars, max. 3500 kg, max. 8 passengers plus driver and a trailer with a max. legal weight of 750 kg. C is for truck over 3500 kg. D is for bus or car over 3500 kg and/or 8 passengers plus driver. E is for trailer over 750 kg. The B/E licence only allows for cars with heavy trailers, even if you have the C and/or D licence. The C/E licence allows for trailer on any vehicle type.

== Non-vehicular traffic ==
People using rollerskates / -blades are legally categorized as pedestrians and must use pavement. However, skateboards and longboards are not allowed. Riding bikes on pavement is similarly not allowed, but very common. When bikes continue straight ahead in crossroads, they can either be in the right of the right-turn lane or in the right of the straight on lane. Cars must wait until bikes have passed, before they turn right.

Vehicles must stop when pedestrians "obviously intend to cross the road" in a zebra crossing.

== Electric vehicles ==
Denmark has opportunities to integrate fluctuating energy sources, such as wind and solar power, into the grid and in the transport sector by focusing on intelligent battery systems (V2G) and plug-in vehicles.

As of 2016 there are over 7,000 electric cars in Denmark. Changes in tax exemptions have influenced sales of EVs.
