= Odsherred Line =

Railway line in Denmark

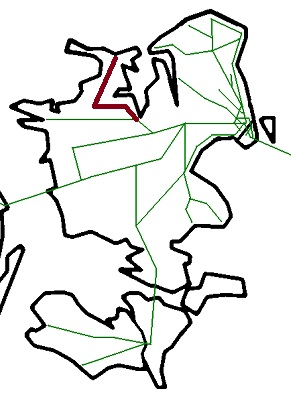

Overview
- Native name: Odsherredsbanen
- Status: 15
- Owner: Hovedstadens Lokalbaner
- Termini: Holbæk 55.71557°N 11.7083°E; Nykøbing Sjælland 55.9219°N 11.6739°E
- Stations: 19

Service
- Type: Railway
- System: Danish railways
- Operator(s): Lokaltog
- Rolling stock: LINT 41

History
- Opened: 1899

Technical
- Line length: 49.4 km (30.7 mi)
- Character: Commuter trains
- Track gauge: 1,435 mm (4 ft 8 1/2 in)
- Electrification: No
- Operating speed: 75 km/h
Route map
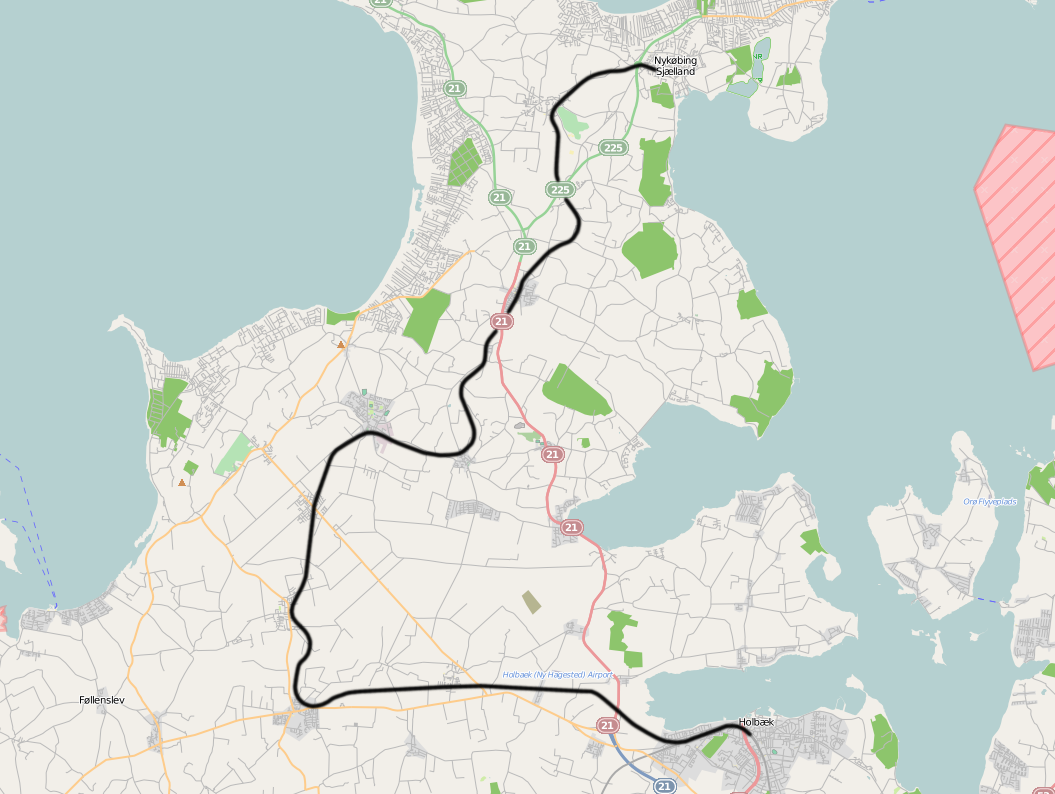
Map of the Odsherred Line between Holbæk and Nykøbing Sjælland

The Odsherred Line (Danish: Odsherredbanen) is a 49.4 km (30.7 mi) long standard gauge single track local passenger railway line linking Holbæk with the town of Nykøbing Sjælland in the northwestern part of the island of Zealand some fifty km west of Copenhagen, Denmark. It takes its name after the Odsherred peninsula. Train services on the Odsherred Line are operated by the railway company Lokaltog.

== History ==
The railway line was built as a result of the Danish Railway Act of 1894. It was created to strengthen the economic development in Odsherred following the reclamation of Lammefjorden. The original intention was to build a station or halt in each of the civil parishes that contributed to its financing. Holbæk County Council was granted a Concession on the railway on 6 May 1896. Construction began the following year and it opened on 18 May 1899. The operator was Odsherreds Jernbane (OHJ).

OHJ operated the railway until May 2003 when it merged with Høng-Tølløse Jernbane under the name Vestsjællands Lokalbaner and with headquarters in Holbæk. From 1 January 2009, the operations were taken over by Regionstog A/S and on 1 January 2015 it was merged with Lokalbanen under the name Lokaltog.

== Operations ==
Trains on the Odsherred Line are operated by the railway company Lokaltog.

== Stations ==
- Nykøbing Sjælland
- Nyled
- Højby Sjælland
- Sommerland Sjælland
- Nørre Asmindrup
- Vig
- Grevinge
- Asnæs
- Fårevejle
- Hørve
- Svinninge
- Gislinge
- Ny Hagested
- Stenhus
- Holbæk

Several station buildings drawn by Heinrich Wenck

== See also ==
- List of railway lines in Denmark
- Northwest Line (Denmark)
