= Lammefjorden =

Reclaimed sea bed in Zealand, Denmark

Coordinates: 55.77°N 11.5°E

The Lammefjord is a polder in Denmark at the base of the Odsherred peninsula. Previously a deeply branched arm of the sea leading west from the Isefjord, most of it is now reclaimed as agricultural land. The eastern third, outside the dyke at Avdebo, is still sea, but the name Lammefjorden now usually refers only to the dry part west of the dyke.

The sandy former sea bed is excellent agricultural land, especially for crops such as carrots and potatoes.

The draining project began in 1873, but it took until 1943 before the lowest elevations were pumped dry. Large parts of the fjord were shallow enough to be dry early on. In 1899 the Odsherred Railway opened across the western end of the fjord. The town of Fårevejle Stationsby grew up where the railway intersects that main road across the seabed; it serves as the administrative and mercantile center for much of the Lammefjord.

The Lammefjord contains Denmark's lowest dry elevation, at 7.0 metres (23 feet 0 inches) below sea level. It is also in running for the lowest in the European Union (shared with Zuidplaspolder in the Netherlands).

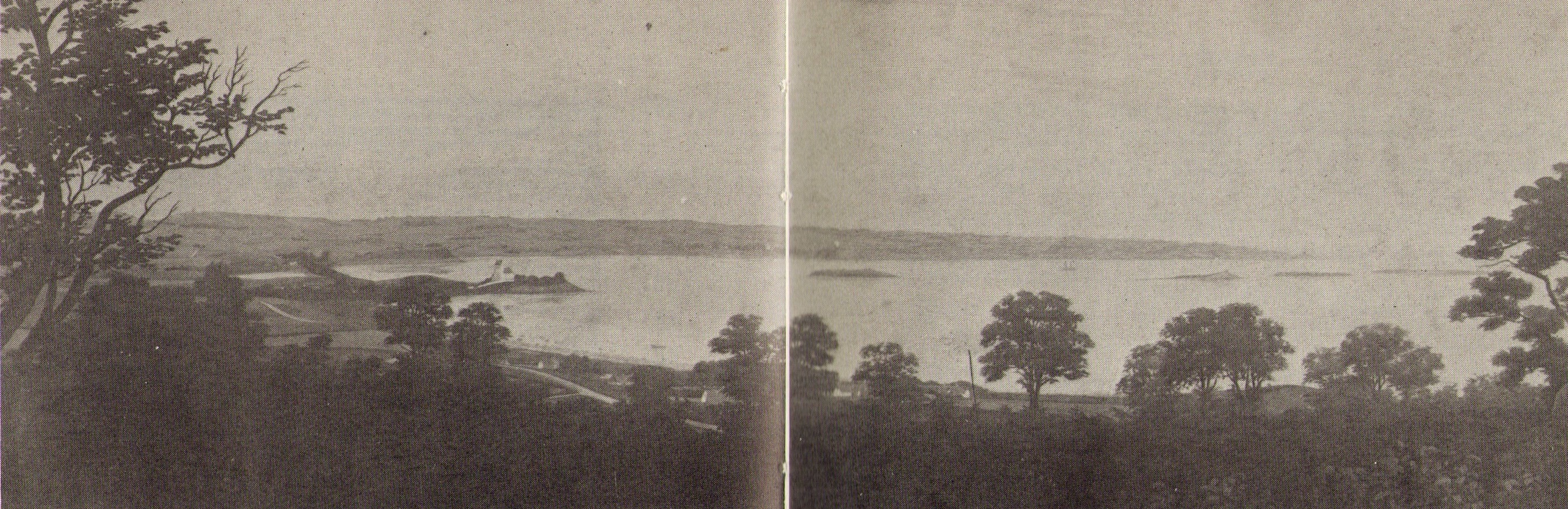
Lammefjorden before drainage (1870)

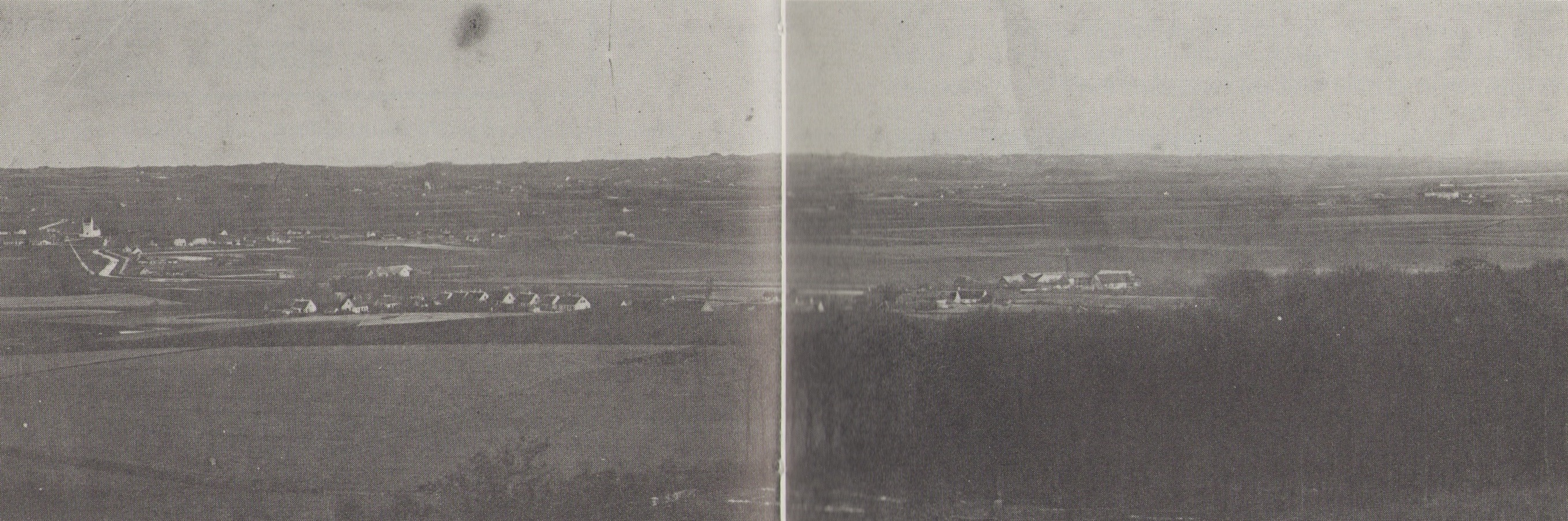
Lammefjorden after drainage (ca. 1920)
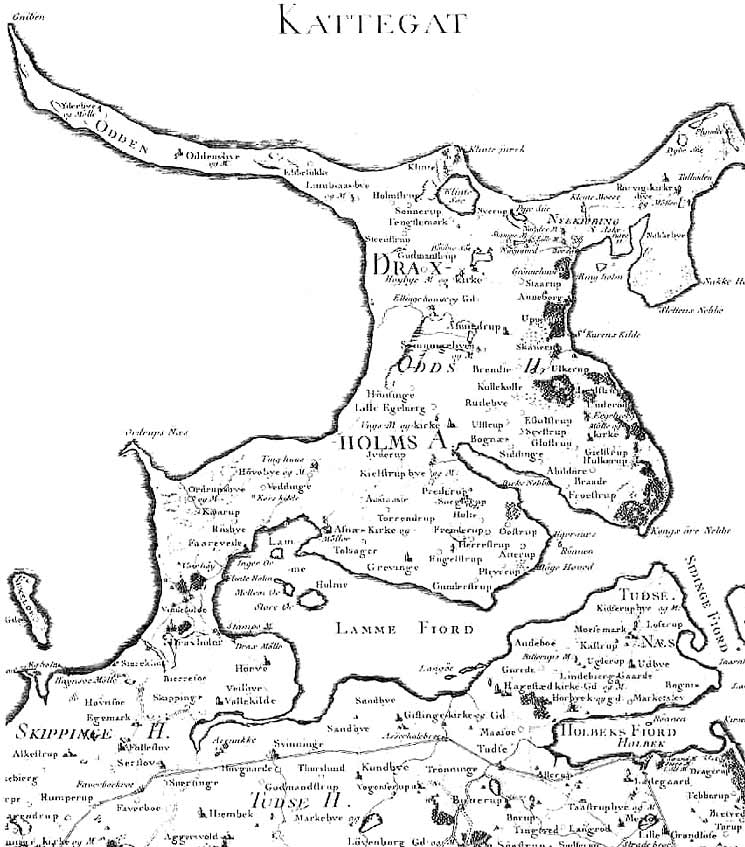
Map of Odsherred from 1768 that shows the original extent of Lammefjordens and Sidinge Fjord, before embankment and drainage

Map from 2017 showing the current extent of Lammefjorden

== See also ==
- Extreme points of the European Union
- List of countries by lowest point
- Table of elevation extremes by country
