= Nykøbing Sjælland railway station =

Railway station in Nykøbing Sjælland, Denmark

Nykøbing Sj.
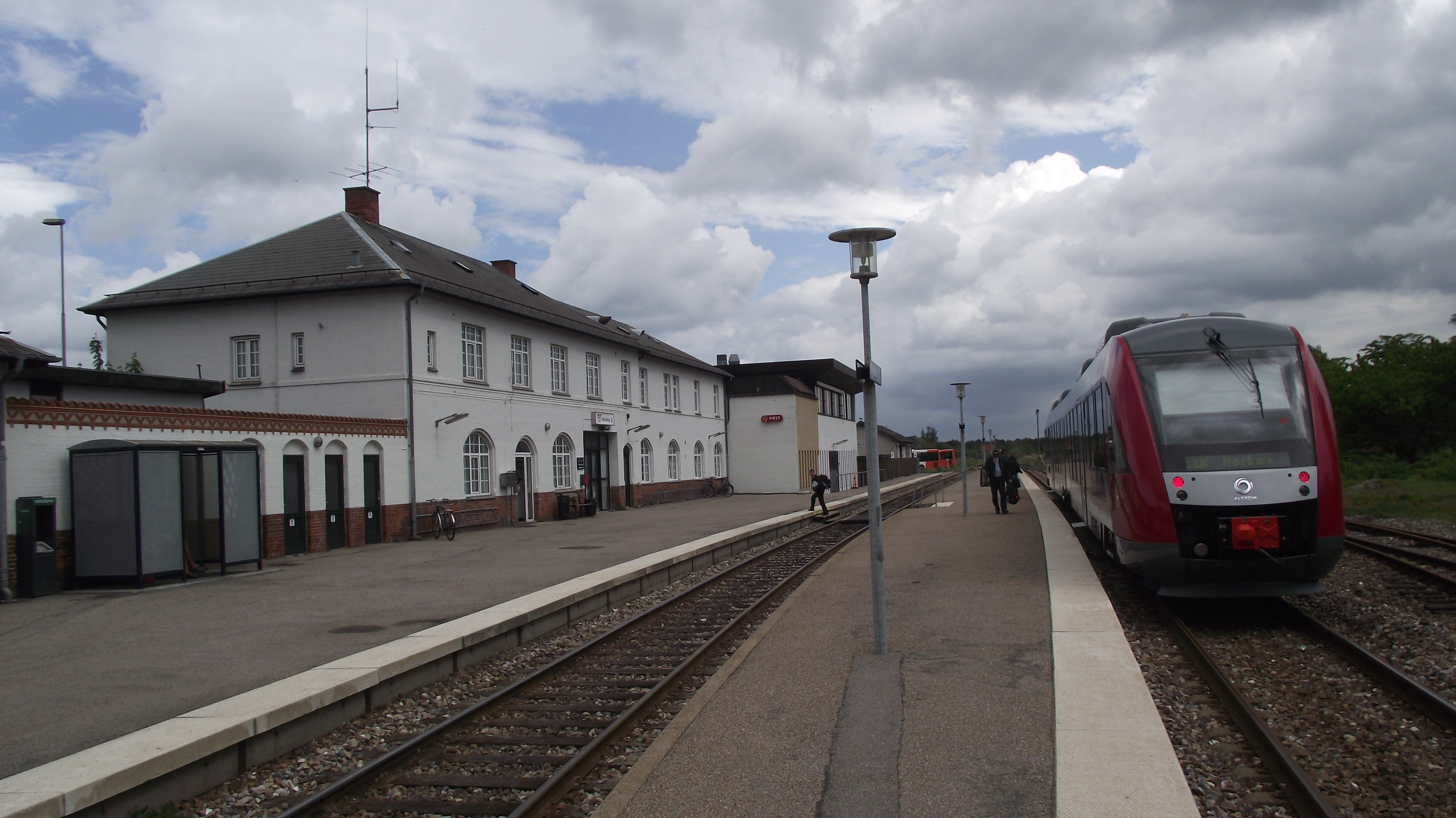
- Nykøbing Sjælland station in 2011

General information
- Location: Jernbanevej 4; 4500 Nykøbing Sjælland; Odsherred Municipality; Denmark
- Coordinates: 55°55′19″N 11°40′26″E
- Elevation: 2.4 metres (7 ft 10 in)
- Operator: Lokaltog
- Line: Odsherred Line
- Platforms: 2
- Tracks: 2

Construction
- Architect: Heinrich Wenck

Other information
- Station code: Nks

History
- Opened: 17 May 1899

Services
Preceding station	Lokaltog	Following station
Nyled towards Holbæk	Odsherred Line Local train	Terminus
Location

Nykøbing Sjælland railway station (Danish: Nykøbing Sjælland Station or Nykøbing Sjælland Banegård) is the main railway station serving the town of Nykøbing Sjælland on the Odsherred peninsula in northwestern Zealand, Denmark. The station is situated in the centre of the town on the southeastern edge of the historic town centre, and lies immediately adjacent to Nykøbing Sjælland's bus station.

Nykøbing Sjælland station is the northern terminus of the Odsherredsbanen branch line from Holbæk to Nykøbing Sjælland. The station opened in 1899 with the opening of the Odsherredsbanen railway line. Its station building was built to designs by the Danish architect Heinrich Wenck. It offers frequent local train services to Holbæk operated by the regional railway company Lokaltog with onward connections from Holbæk to the rest of the Danish rail network.

== History ==
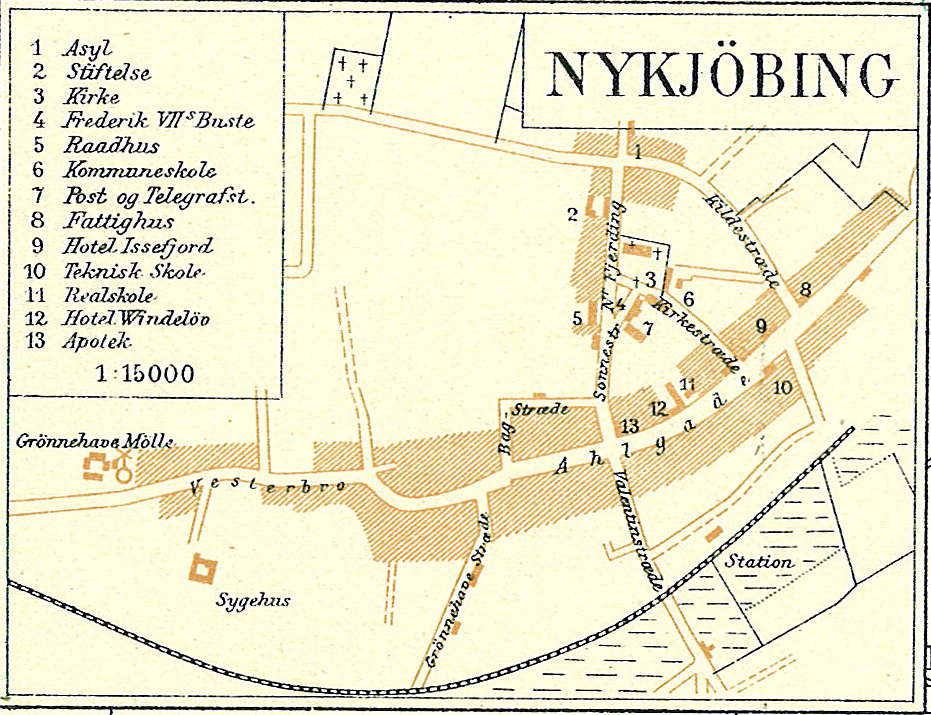
Historic map of Nykøbing Sjælland, c. 1900

The station opened on 17 May 1899 to serve as northern terminus of the new railway line from Holbæk through the Odsherred peninsula to Nykøbing Sjælland. The station was constructed in open fields southeast of the town, based on an ambition to later extend the Odsherred Line to Rørvig, an ambition which was never realized.

Previously, an industrial siding connected Nykøbing Sjælland station with the port of Nykøbing. It was in use until the 1970s.

== Operations ==
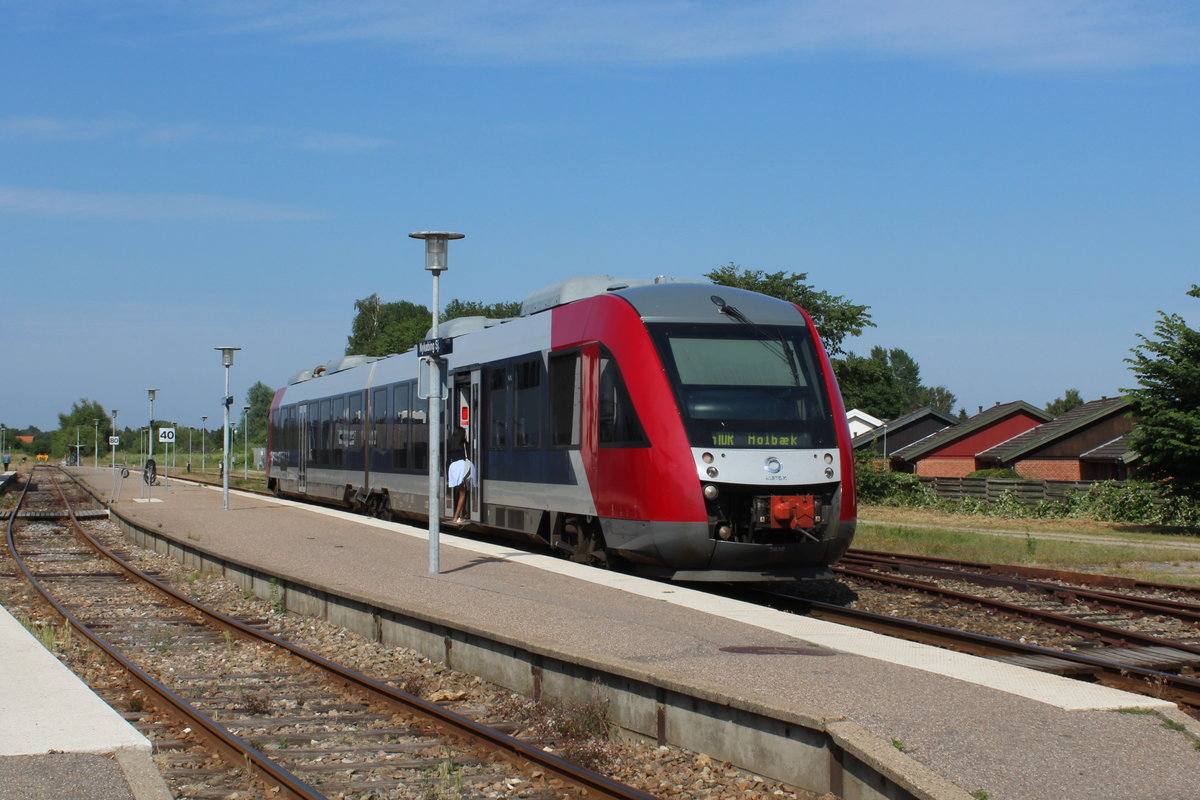
LINT 41 railcar ready to depart for Holbæk at Nykøbing station in June 2019

The train services are currently operated by the regional railway company Lokaltog which run local train services from Nykøbing Sjælland station to Holbæk with onward connections from Holbæk to the rest of the Danish rail network. Lokaltog operates a fairly frequent service on the Odsherred Line with two departures per hour during daytime on weekdays, and one departure per hour the rest of time.

== Architecture ==
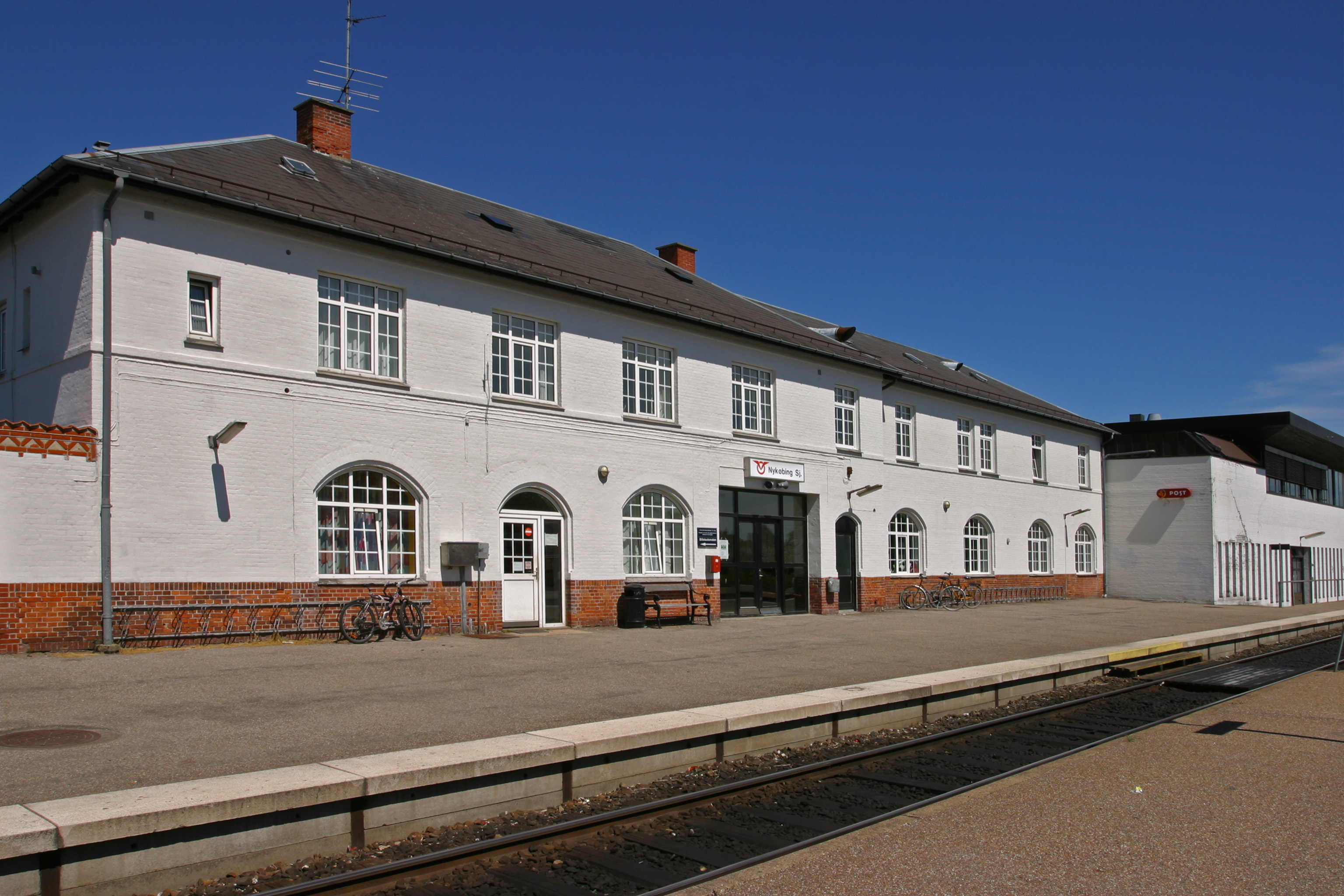
Platform facade of Nykøbing Sjælland station in 2006

The original station building from 1899 still exists. It was built to designs by the Danish railway architect Heinrich Wenck (1851–1936), known for the numerous railway stations he designed across Denmark in his capacity of head architect of the Danish State Railways from 1894 to 1921.

== See also ==
- List of railway stations in Denmark
- Rail transport in Denmark
- Transport in Denmark
