= Transport in Denmark =

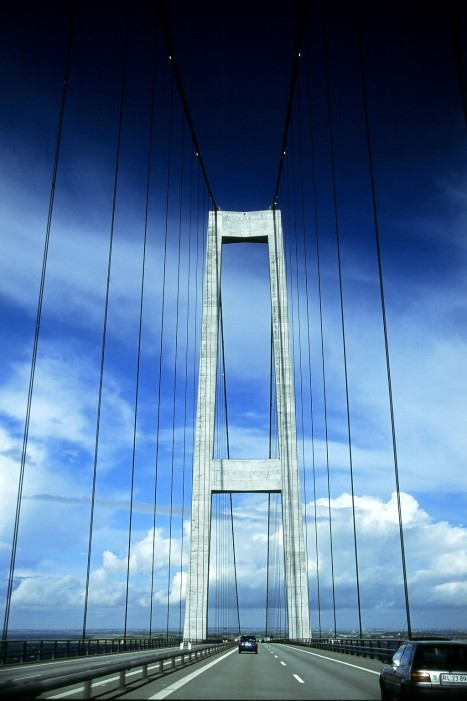
The Great Belt Fixed Link connecting the islands of Zealand and Funen across the Great Belt was opened in 1997

Transport in Denmark encompasses airports, waterways, motorways, and railways. The motorway network covers 1,111 km while the railway network totals 2,667 km of operational track. The Great Belt Fixed Link (opened in 1997) connecting the islands of Zealand and Funen and the New Little Belt Bridge (opened in 1970) connecting Funen and Jutland greatly improved the traffic flow across the country on both motorways and rail. The two largest airports of Copenhagen and Billund provide a variety of domestic and international connections, while ferries provide services to the Faroe Islands, Greenland, Iceland, Germany, Sweden, and Norway, as well as domestic routes servicing most Danish islands.

== Air ==
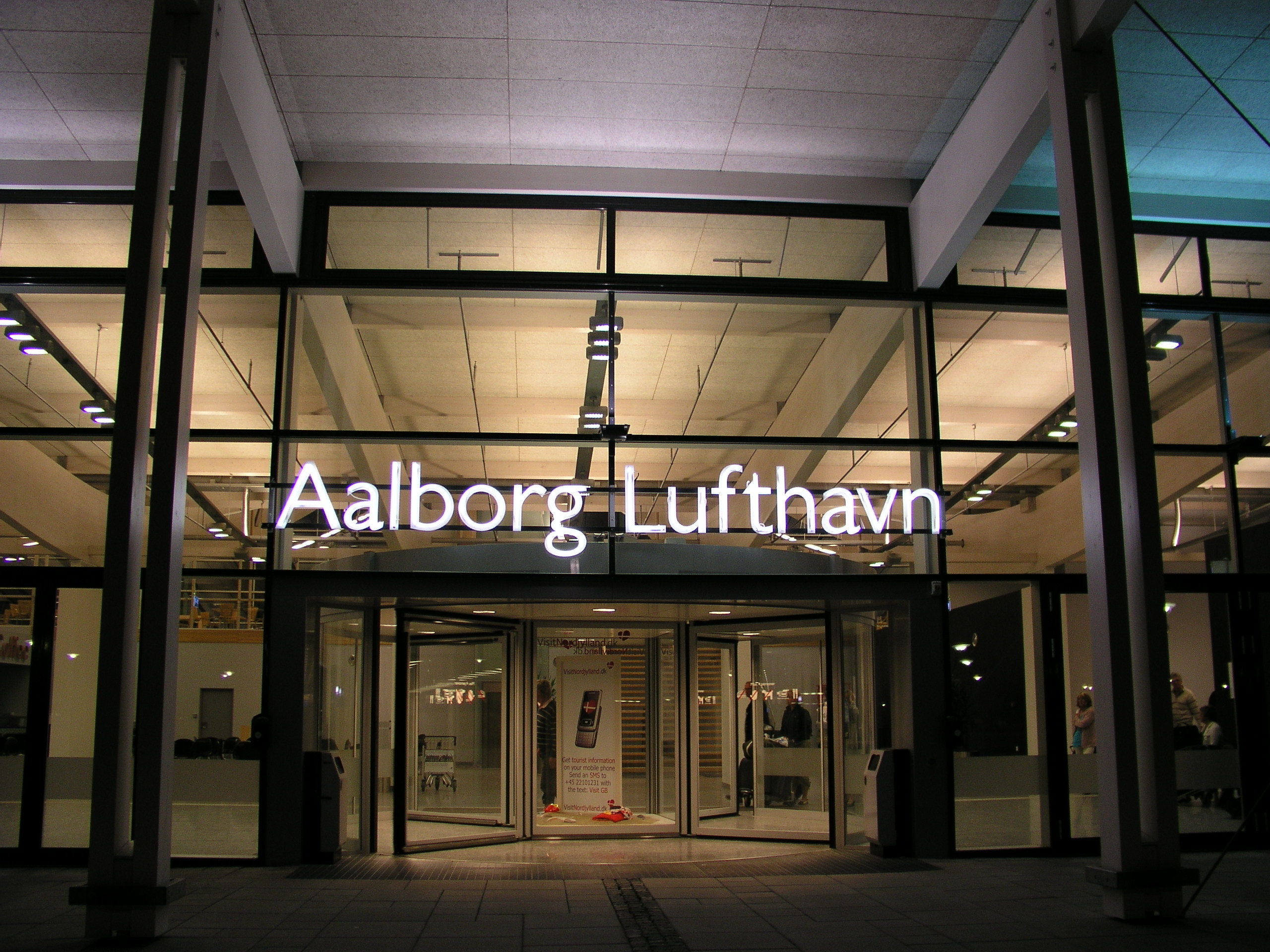
Aalborg airport in the north of Jutland

In 2011, a total of appr. 28 million passengers used Danish airports.

Copenhagen Airport is the largest airport in Scandinavia, handling approximately 32m passengers per year (2025). It is located at Kastrup, 8 km south-east of central Copenhagen. It is connected by train to Copenhagen Central Station and beyond as well as to Malmö and other towns in Sweden.

For the west of the country, the major airport is Billund (3m passengers in 2016) although both Aalborg (1.4m passengers in 2011) and Aarhus (591.000 passengers in 2011) have smaller airports with regular connections to Copenhagen.

=== List of airports ===
Denmark's main airports are:

- Copenhagen Airport (CPH), Scandinavia's busiest passenger airport located at Kastrup to the south-east of Copenhagen city and handling over 32 million passengers a year.
- Billund Airport (BLL), in central Jutland, one of Denmark's busiest cargo centres as well as a popular charter airline destination and an airport for regular flights serving 3 million passengers a year, mainly from the western part of the country.
- Aalborg Airport (AAL), located 5 km northwest of Aalborg, is Denmark's third busiest airport serving around 1,4 million passengers a year in connections with 25 European destinations and one of Europes busiest domestic lines to Copenhagen.
- Aarhus Airport (AAR), located 39 km northeast of Århus, serves some 540,000 passengers a year.

Other airports include:

- Karup Airport (KRP) near Viborg in the west of Jutland, mainly serving Copenhagen with some 200,000 passengers a year.
- Bornholm Airport (RNN) 5 km from the centre of Rønne in the southwest of the island of Bornholm, with several regular flights to Copenhagen a day.
- Esbjerg Airport (EBJ), a small airport in the west of Jutland with regular flights to Aberdeen and Stavanger (although primarily serving North Sea Oilrigs).
- Sønderborg Airport (SGD), in the very south of Jutland with connections to Copenhagen.
- Roskilde Airport (RKE), 7 km southeast of Roskilde and some 38 km southwest of Copenhagen, serves mainly airtaxi and private business traffic.

== Sea ==
Maritime transport has always been important in Denmark, from the dugouts of the Stone Age to the more advanced Viking ships in the Viking Age. Denmark also engaged in the large scale cargo freights and slave transports of the European colonization endeavours in the early modern period and operated several smaller colonies of its own by means of seafaring.

Today Denmark's ports handle 48 million passengers and 109 million tonnes of cargo per year.

=== Passenger traffic ===
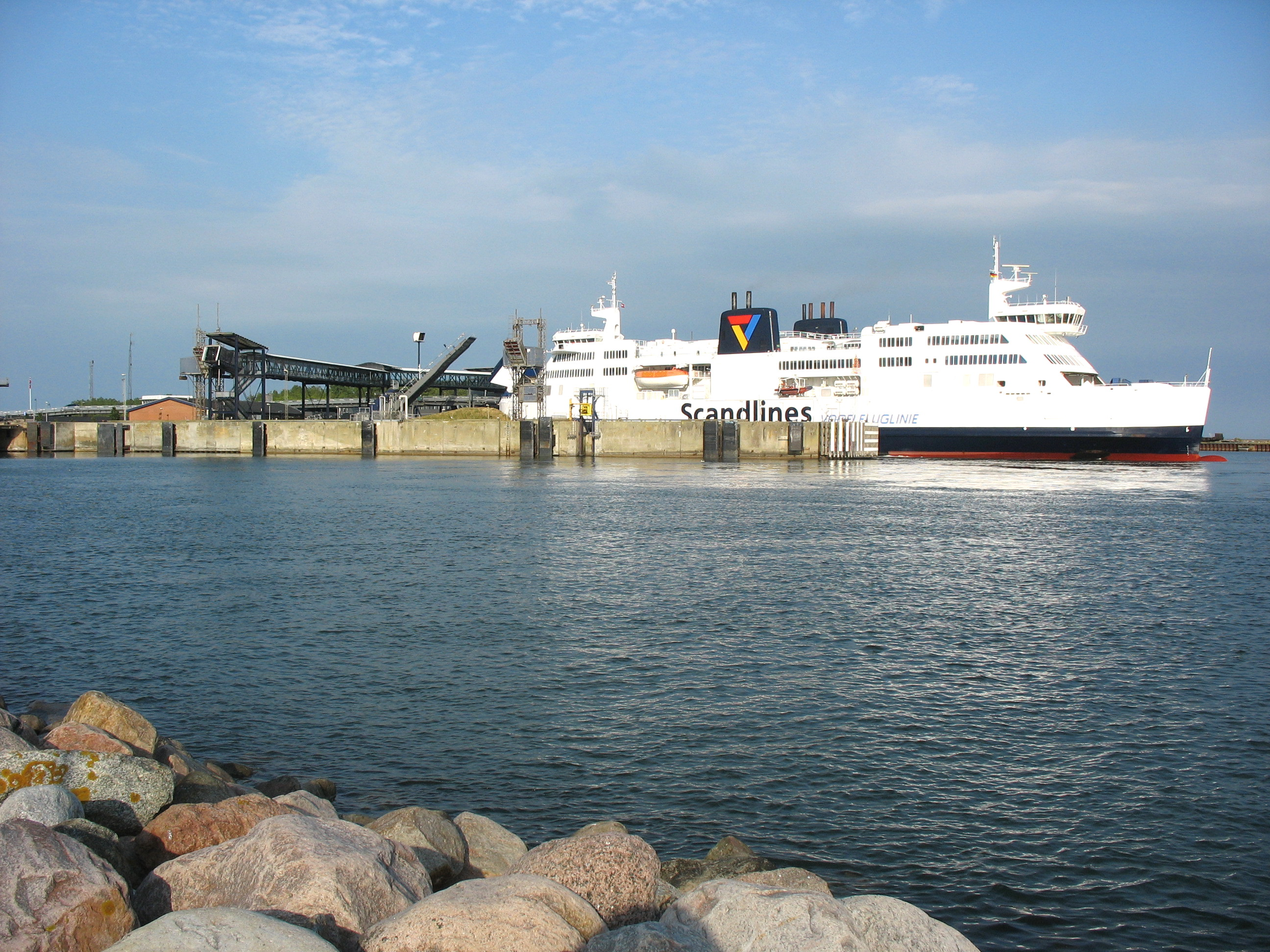
Rødbyhavn ferry terminal on Lolland

Passenger traffic is made up partly of ferry crossings within Denmark, partly of international ferry crossings and partly of cruise ship passengers. Some short ferry routes are being electrified and several more may be eligible, as in Norway.

Map of Denmark showing the locations of the major ports

Among the most important ports for passenger traffic (thousands of passengers per year in 2007) are:

- Helsingør 10,967
- Rødbyhavn 7,058
- Frederikshavn 2,894
- Sjællands Odde 2,233
- Esbjerg 1,827
- Gedser 1,612
- Aarhus 1,583
- Rønne 1,522
- Ebeltoft 962
- Copenhagen 872

In 2007, 288 cruise ships visited Copenhagen, rising to 376 in 2011 before returning to around 300 the following years. Around 800,000 cruise passengers and 200,000 crew visit Copenhagen each year.

=== Cargo traffic ===
Among the most important ports for cargo traffic (millions of tonnes per year in 2007) are:

- Fredericia 15,327
- Aarhus 12,189
- Copenhagen 7,379
- Helsingør 4,480
- Esbjerg 4,476
- Kalundborg 3,714
- Frederikshavn 3,200
- Aalborg Portland 2,999
- Aalborg 2,749
- Odense 2,616

=== Waterways ===
Waterways have historically been important to local transportation in Denmark – especially the Gudenå river-system in central Jutland. The waterways were navigated by wooden barges and later on steamboats. A few historical steamboats are still in operation, like the SS Hjejlen from 1861 at Silkeborg.

There is a 160 km natural canal through the shallow Limfjorden in northern Jutland, linking the North Sea to the Kattegat.

Many waterways were redirected through manmade canals in the 1900s, but mainly for agricultural purposes and not to facilitate transportation on any major scale. Several cities have manmade canals used for transportation and traffic purposes. Of special mention are the canals of Copenhagen and the Odense Canal, ferrying large numbers of both tourists and local citizens.

=== Merchant marine ===
External image
- Traffic and protected areas around Denmark

Denmark has a large merchant fleet relative to its size. In 2018, the fleet surpassed 20 million gt as the government sought to repatriate Danish-owned tonnage registered abroad, with measures including removal of the registration fee.

Denmark has created its own international register, called the Danish International Ship register (DIS), open to commercial vessels only. DIS ships do not have to meet Danish manning regulations.

== Railways ==
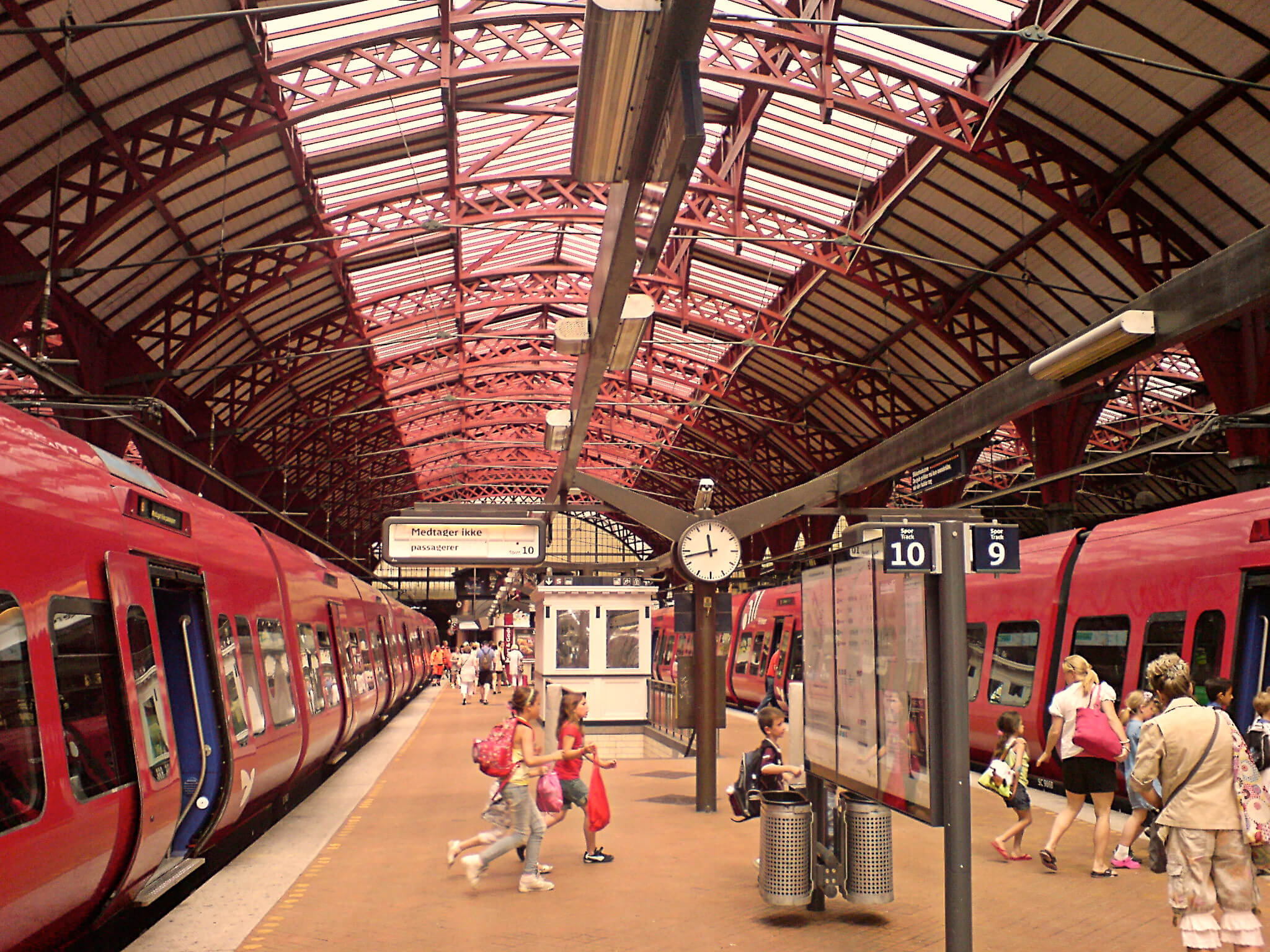
Copenhagen Central Station with S-Trains.

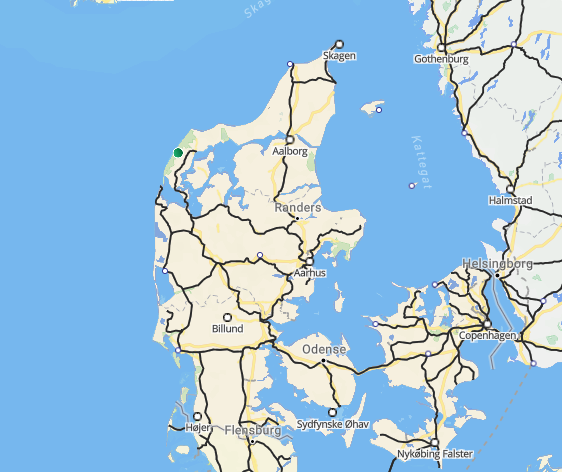
Denmark railway network

The largest railway operator in Denmark is Danske Statsbaner (DSB) — Danish State Railways. GoCollective (formerly Arriva) used to operate some routes in Jutland, but the routes were taken over by DSB on 1 September 2026 due to breach of contract by GoCollective. Several other smaller operators provide local services.

The total length of operational track is 3,476 km standard gauge, with 1,756 km electrified.

The railway system is connected to Sweden by bridge in Copenhagen and ferry in Helsingør and Frederikshavn, by land to Germany in Padborg and ferry in Rødby and to Norway by ferry in Hirtshals.

== Roads ==
The road network in 2017 totalled 74,558 km of paved road. Motorways are toll-free except for the Great Belt Bridge joining Zealand and Funen and the Øresund Bridge linking Copenhagen to Malmö in Sweden.

Motorways in Denmark.

== Cycling ==
Bicycling in Denmark is a common and popular utilitarian and recreational activity. Bicycling infrastructure is a dominant feature of both city and countryside infrastructure, with bicycle paths and bicycle ways in many places and an extensive network of bicycle routes, extending more than 12,000 kilometres (7,500 mi) nationwide. In comparison, Denmark's coastline is 7,314 kilometres (4,545 mi). As a unique feature, Denmark has a VIN-system for bicycles which is mandatory by law. Often bicycling and bicycle culture in Denmark is compared to the Netherlands as a bicycle-nation.

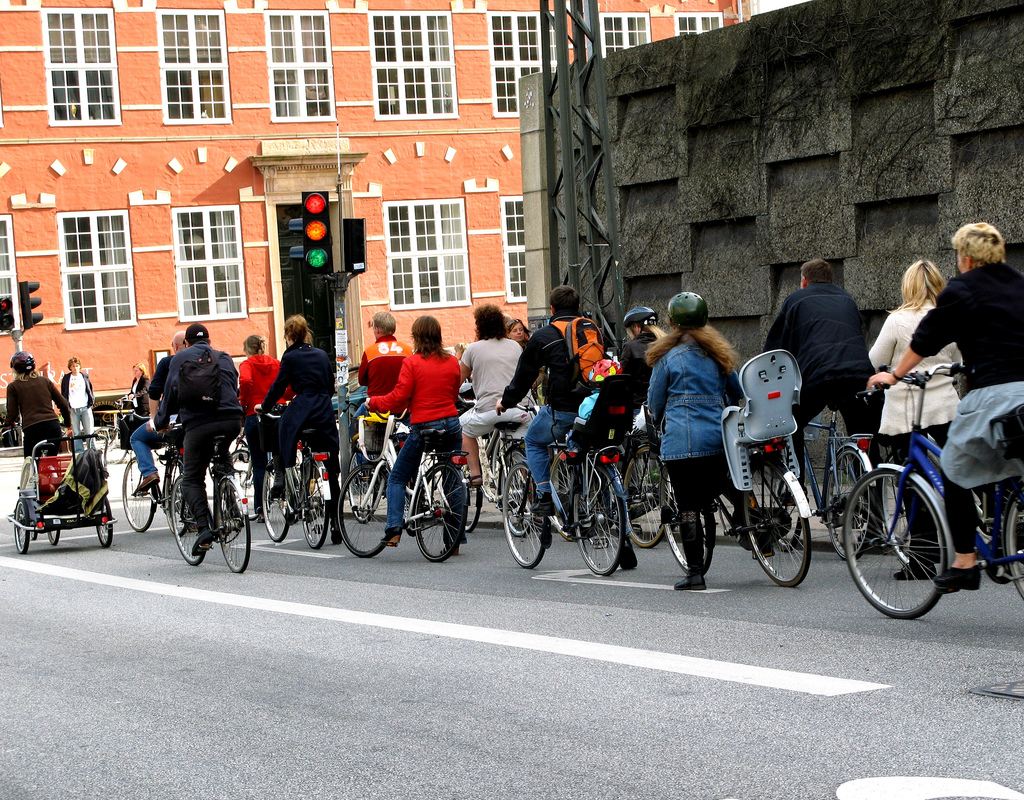
Bicycle rush hour in Copenhagen.

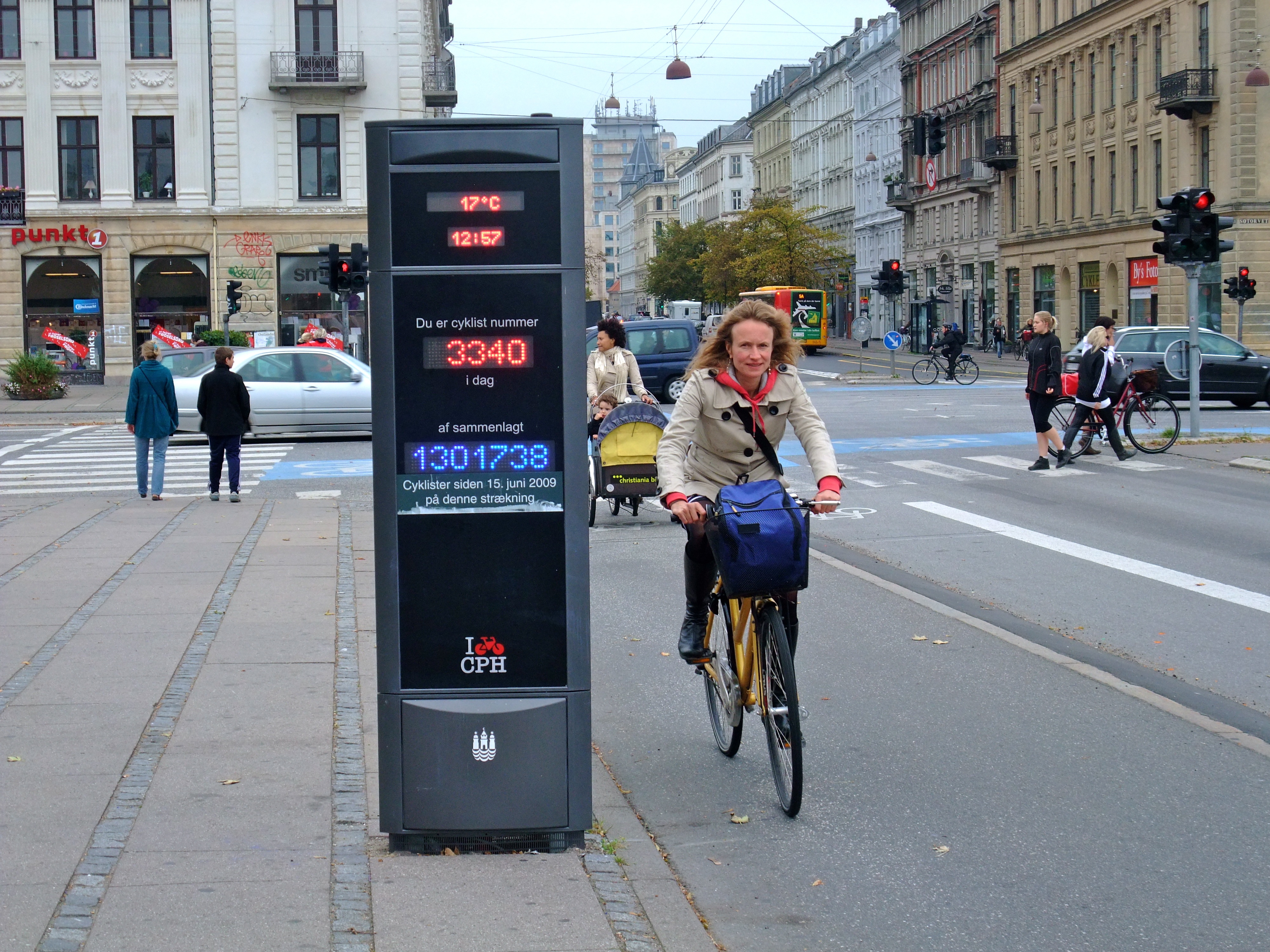
Heavily trafficked roads in the inner cities, often have cycle lanes.

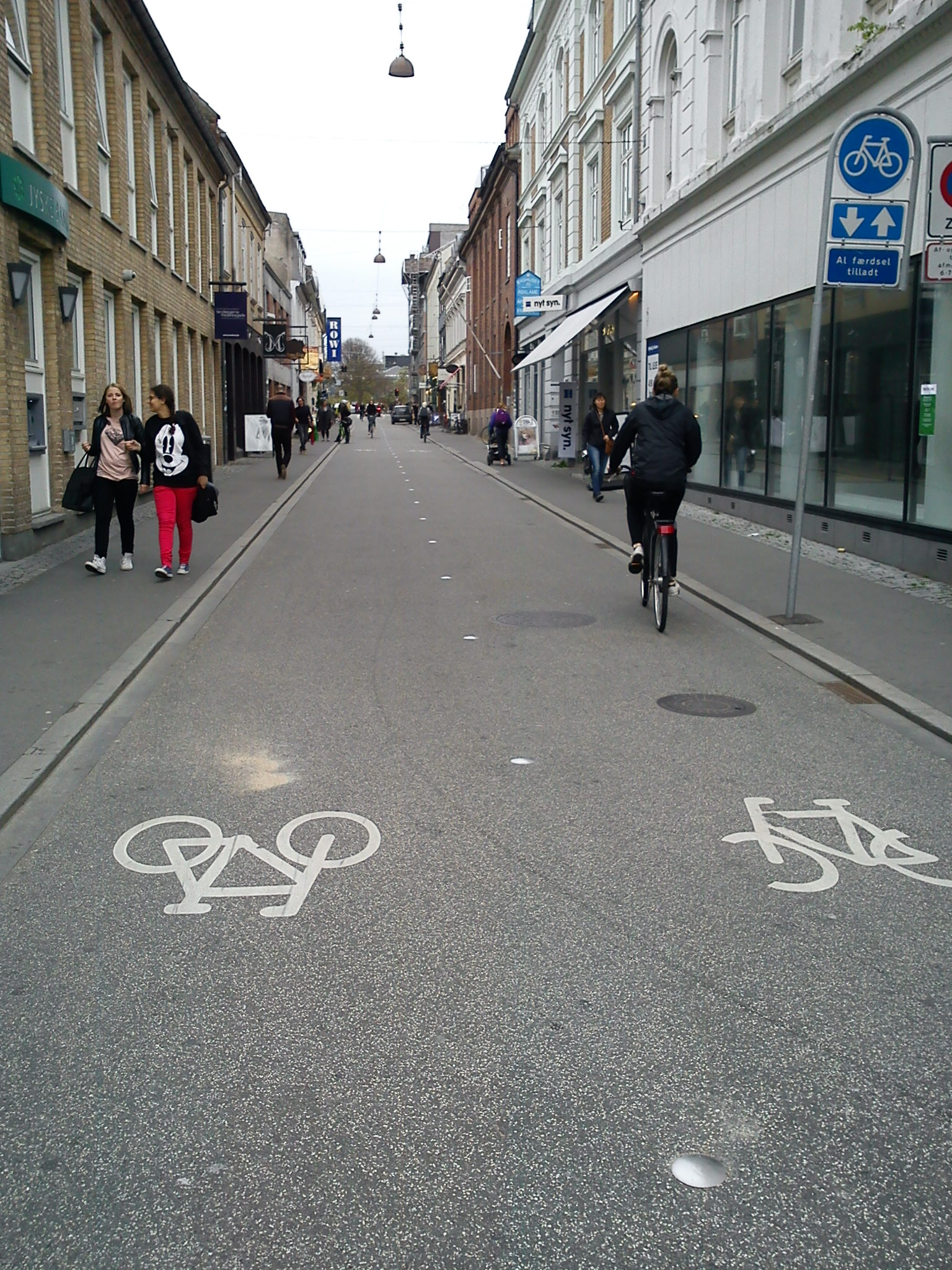
A bike road in central Aarhus.

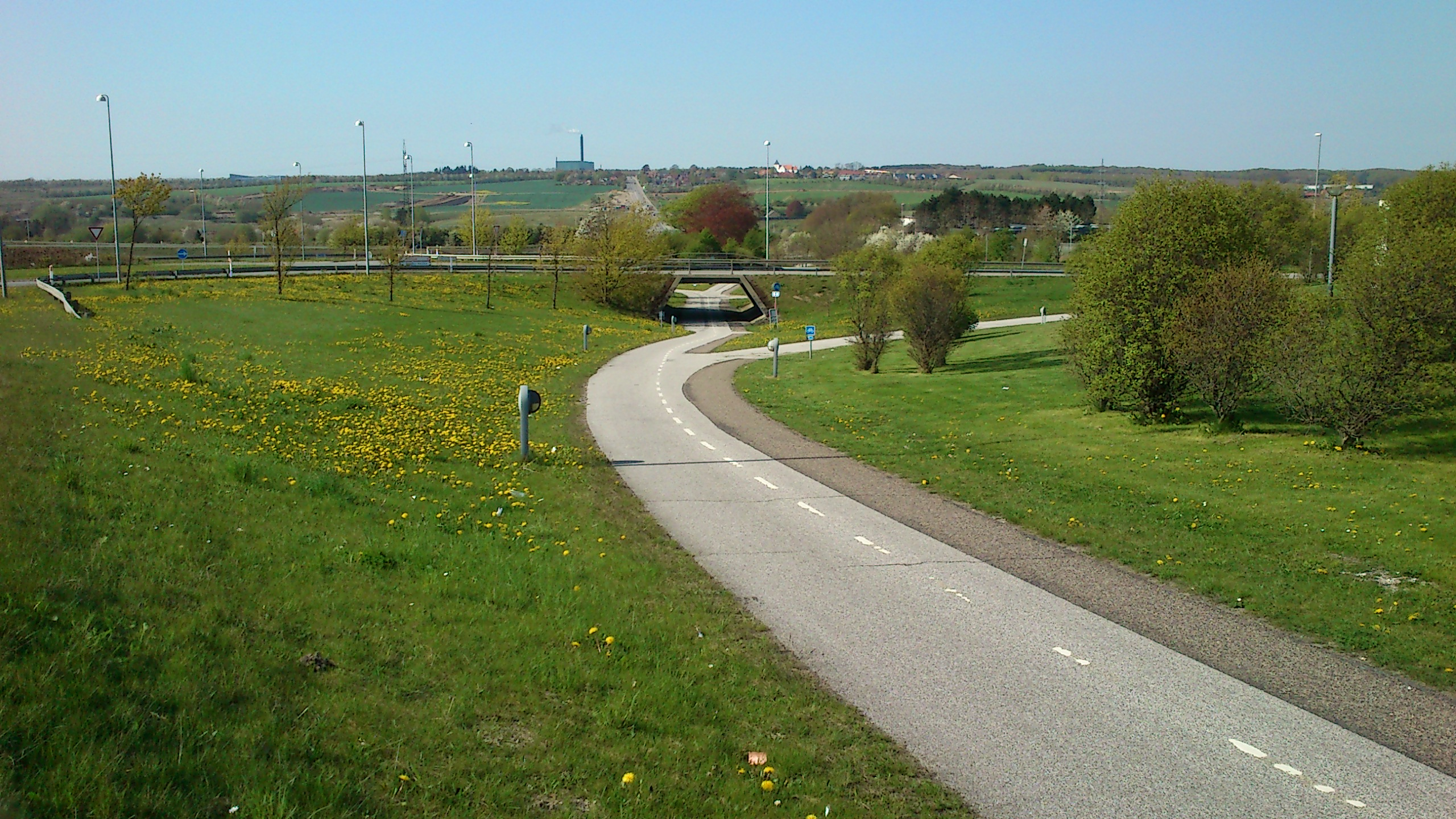
A cross country bikeway route.

== Pipelines ==
Figures in 2015:

Crude oil
330 km
Petroleum products
578 km (2007)
Natural gas
1536 km

== See also ==
- Denmark
- Road traffic in Denmark
- Overseas constituencies
  - Transport in the Faroe Islands
  - Transport in Greenland
