= Odsherred =

North-western peninsula of Zealand, Denmark

Coordinates: 55°53′00″N 11°35′40″E

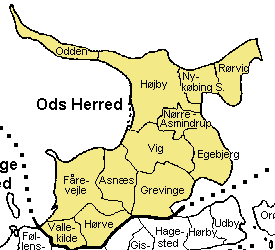

Odsherred is a peninsula in the north-western part of the island Zealand (Sjælland) in Denmark. Odsherred stretches from the Sjællands Odde in the north-west to the now drained Lammefjord in the south, covering an area with a wide range of the most typical Danish landscapes: long sandy beaches, small rolling hills and farming. The peninsula is served by the railway Odsherredsbanen, which runs through the most important towns, including Nykøbing Sjælland, Asnæs and Hørve.

== History ==
The last part of the name herred derives from a medieval practice of dividing the country in districts herreder which created the frame for regional justice and possibly also for recruitment of soldiers to the national army and fleet. They roughly correspond to today's counties. Odsherred was only one out of many of such herreder, since every part of the country was also a part of a herred. After the administrative importance of the herreder ended in 1919, the once common name began to disappear all over the country. It is however still to be found in areas such as Hornsherred and Hanherred and Odsherred.

=== Prehistoric times ===
The first habitations in Odsherred reach back to the Stone Age. One of the most fascinating remains from that time, the entire skeleton of a giant ox killed by prehistoric hunters, can now be seen at the Zoological museum in Copenhagen, where it is now part of the exhibition of prehistoric animals. Before that it was visible for guests at the now closed museum in the village of Høve. Another period whose remains can still be found in Odsherred today is the Bronze Age, since the population of that time buried their dead in small artificial hills in Danish called "gravhøje". These can be seen at places such as Dutter Høje close to Asnæs, Esterhøj in Høve and in the village of Stenstrup. One of the most famous Danish archeological finds, Solvognen, is also from that period and was found in a peat in central Odsherred. Solvognen is a ca. 50 cm. long statue made in bronze and gold showing horses in front of a wagon carrying the sun. It is now to be seen at the National Museum in Copenhagen, where it is one of the most spectacular artifacts.

=== Middle Ages to present ===
In the Middle Ages Odsherred was fortified with the construction of the castle of Dragsholm (Dragsholm Slot), situated just there where the land between the peninsula and the rest of Zealand was most narrow. The castle was the property of the pontiff in the town of Roskilde, and created both the basis for farming and for defending of Odsherred. The strategical position of the castle can only hardly be seen today, since the Lammefjord is now dry and therefore does not create a natural border for troops on land, but the castle itself is still both visible and inhabitable, even though the appearance has been changed over the years.

In the age of absolutism most of Odsherred was the property of the Danish king. The inhabitants were paying their taxes directly to the court instead of to the baron who was now residing at Dragsholm Slot and the king did use the peninsula for hunting and foresting.

The rapid changes in the Danish society in the 19th century did also inflict Odsherred, which lost its status as royal property and even some of its status as a peninsula with the draining of Lammefjorden. In the first decades the new farming land in the now dry fjord was rocky, swampy and smelly, but since the middle of the 20th century the area has been known for its good soil and quality products such as potatoes and carrots. The waves of drainage also hit Siddingefjorden and the lakes of Klint and Højby. The latter is now reestablished as lake, creating a valuable natural habitat for various kinds of birds.

== Contemporary Odsherred ==
Odsherred Kommune coat of arms, displaying the Trundholm sun chariot, a prehistoric artifact discovered in 1902 in an Odsherred peat bog.

Odsherred today is still today an area with a lot of farming, but other industries are also important. In the town of Fårevejle is the Stelton factory, famous for the design of kitchen products, and Poul Johansens Fabrikker, constructing machines for the fabrication of Lego. The medical company Lundbeck has a big factory In the village of Lumsås in the north of Odsherred. Tourism is also an important sector, with almost all of the western coast of the peninsula being covered with leisure housing. Among the most popular tourist sites can be mentioned the port of Rørvig, the funfair Sommerland Sjælland and the beautiful landscape of bjergene.

After Kommunalreformen ("Municipality Reform" of 2007) the three former municipalities in Odsherred (Dragsholm, Nykøbing-Rørvig, and Trundholm) were merged into one, creating the Odsherred municipality. While the reform created much debate in other parts of the country, most people in Odsherred saw this solution as natural, since the peninsula is widely regarded as a unity. There have also before the reform been much collaboration between the three municipalities and between many private societies in the area. The new Odsherred municipality will cover 355 km^{2} and a population of ca. 33.000, but the exact administrative borders have been changing many times in the last thousand years.

At the elections held in late 2005 the mayor of Dragsholm, the social democrat Finn Madsen was given the mandate as mayor for the new Odsherred municipality.

=== The new route 21 ===
In November 2013, a new motorway between Holbæk and Vig in Odsherred was inaugurated.

== Notable people ==
- Clemens Petersen (1834 in Asminderup – 1918) a Danish esthetician, theatre and literary critic
- Ole Justesen (born 1946 in Odsherred) a Danish former sports shooter, competed at the 1972, 1980 and the 1992 Summer Olympics
- Cecilie Manz (born 1972 in Odsherred) a Danish industrial designer, her work includes furniture, jewellery, lamps and sculptures
