= Bang (surname) =

Bang is a Korean surname as well as a Scandinavian surname. The Korean surname is cognate to the Chinese surname Fāng (方). The Scandinavian surname is derived from the Old Norse banga which means to pound or hammer. Notable people with the surname include:

== Korean origin ==
- Bang
- Hangul: 방
- Hanja: 方, 房, 龐, 邦, 防, 旁, 芳
- RR: Bang
- MR: Pang

- Andrea Bang (born 1989), Canadian actress
- Bang Chan (born 1997), Australian musician, member of boy band Stray Kids
- Bang Cheol-yong (stage name Mir, born 1991), South Korean singer, member of boy band MBLAQ
- Pang Chol-gap (born 1936), North Korean politician
- Pang Chol-mi (born 1994), North Korean boxer
- Pang Chun-dok, North Korean former international table tennis player
- Bang Dae-du (born 1954), South Korean retired wrestler
- Bang Dae-jong (born 1985), South Korean footballer
- Diana Bang (born 1981), Canadian actress and writer
- Bang Eun-hee (born 1967), South Korean actress
- Bang Eun-jin (born 1965), South Korean actress and film director
- Bang Eun-jung (born 1992), South Korean actress
- Bang Geul-yi (born 1987), South Korean television director
- Bang Hai Ja (1937–2022), South Korean-born painter and artist
- Pang Hak-se (1914–1992), North Korean politician
- Pang Ho-san (1916–1959), North Korean military officer
- Bang Hyeon-seok (born 1961), South Korean writer
- Go Eun-ah (born Bang Hyo-jin, 1988), South Korean actress
- Bang Hyo-mun (born 1965), South Korean weightlifter
- Bang Hyun-joo (born 1966), South Korean sport shooter
- Bang Jae-ho (born 1992), South Korean actor and model
- Bang Jae-min (born 1999), South Korean actor and rapper
- Bang Jee-min (born 2005), South Korean singer and dancer, member of girl band Izna
- Bang Jeong-hwan (1899–1931), Korean children's rights activist
- Bang Jin-hyeok (born 1975), South Korean field hockey player
- Bang Jun-hyuk (born 1968), South Korean businessman, founder and chairman of Netmarble
- Bang Jun-seok (1970–2022), South Korean film score composer and music director
- Bang Jun-yeong (born 1965), South Korean swimmer
- Pang Kum-chol (born 1981), North Korean weightlifter
- Bang Min-ah (born 1993), South Korean singer and actress, member of girl group Girl's Day
- Bang Min-ja (born 1962), South Korean wheelchair curler
- Ryan Bang (born 1991), South Korean entertainer
- Bang Seong-joon (born 1973), South Korean voice actor
- Bang Seung-hun (born 1975), South Korean swimmer
- Bang Seung-hwan (born 1983), South Korean footballer
- Bang Shin-sil (born 2004), South Korean golfer
- Bang Si-hyuk (born 1972), South Korean songwriter, producer, and record executive
- Bang Sin-bong (born 1975), South Korean former volleyball player
- Bang Sin-hye (born 1967), South Korean hurdler
- Pang Sin-u (1267–1343), Goryeo eunuch who served Princess Jeguk
- Bang Soo-hyun (born 1972), South Korean former badminton player
- Bang Sung-hoon (born 1983), South Korean actor and model
- JJonak (born Bang Sung-hyeon, c. 1999), South Korean professional esports player
- Bang Sung-joon (born 1990), South Korean actor and model
- Pang Tu-sop, North Korean army general and politician
- Bang Won-sun, South Korean basketball player
- Bang Ye-dam (born 2002), South Korean singer
- Seol In-ah (born Bang Ye-rin, 1996), South Korean actress
- Bang Yeol (born 1941), South Korean former basketball player, former president of Korea Basketball Association
- Bang Yong-guk (born 1990), South Korean rapper, member of boy band B.A.P
- Bang Young-ung (1942–2022), South Korean novelist
- May (singer) (born Bang Yu-jeong, 1982), South Korean singer

== Scandinavian origin ==
- Andrea Bang (born 1989), Canadian actress
- Anthon Bang (1809–1870), Danish-Norwegian writer and publisher
- Anton Christian Bang (1840–1913), Norwegian bishop, writer and politician
- Arne Bang-Hansen (1911–1990), Norwegian actor
- Aske Bang (born 1988), Danish actor and director
- Bang Bang (Dubliner) (1906–1981), Irish eccentric
- Bang Bang (tattoo artist) (born 1985), American celebrity tattoo artist
- Bernhard Bang (1848–1932), Danish veterinarian
- Betsy Bang (1912–2003), American biologist, scientific and medical illustrator
- Billy Bang (1947–2011), American jazz violinist and composer
- Carolina Bang (born 1985), Spanish actress
- Cathrinus Bang (1822–1898), Norwegian literary historian
- Chen Bang (born 1965), Chinese billionaire businessman
- Christen Bang (1584–1678), Norwegian priest and publisher
- Claes Bang (born 1967), Danish actor and musician
- Clara Bang (born 2004), Danish handball player
- Dagny Bang (1868–1944), Norwegian physician and Liberal Party politician
- Diana Bang (born 1981), Canadian actress
- Eilif Bang (1892–1953), Norwegian businessman
- Elisabeth Bang (1922–2009), Norwegian actress
- Elizabeth Bang (born 1942), New Zealand nurse
- Ellen Bang (1906–1981), German actress
- Esben Holmboe Bang (born 1982), Danish-Norwegian chef
- Farid Bang (born 1986), German rapper
- Fred Bang (1916–1981), American scientist
- Frederik Ludvig Bang (1747–1820), Danish medical doctor
- Fredo Bang (born 1996), American rapper
- Hans Bang (1863–1945), Norwegian judge
- Herman Bang (1857–1912), Danish journalist and author
- Ippongi Bang (born 1965), Japanese manga artist
- Jacob E. Bang (1899–1965), Danish designer
- Jan Bang (born 1968), Norwegian musician and record producer
- Jens Bang (1575–1644), Danish merchant
- Jette Bang (1914–1964), Danish photographer and filmmaker
- Joakim Sveder Bang (1868–1931), Norwegian physician and politician
- Joy Bang (born 1945), American actress
- Karin Bang (1928–2017), Norwegian writer
- Kjetil Bang-Hansen (born 1940), Norwegian actor and theatre director
- Leif Georg Ferdinand Bang (1881–1963), Norwegian politician
- Liu Shan Bang (1800–1857), Leader of Chinese uprising in Borneo
- Marcus Fredrik Bang (1711–1789), Danish-Norwegian priest
- Maren Elisabeth Bang (1797–1884), Norwegian author of cookbooks and housekeeping guides
- Marie Vilhelmine Bang (1848–1932), Danish painter
- Mary Jo Bang (born 1946), American poet
- Molly Bang (born 1943), American illustrator
- Niels Bang (1776–1815), Danish landowner
- Nils Bang (1941–1977), South African oceanographer
- Nina Bang (1866–1928), Danish politician and historian
- Nina Bang (1866–1928), Danish politician and historian
- Odd Bang-Hansen (1908–1984), Norwegian educator, journalist and author
- Ole Bang (1788–1877), Danish medical doctor
- Oluf Lundt Bang (lawyer) (1731–1789), Danish judge
- Otto T. Bang (1931–2008), American businessman and politician
- Ove Bang (1895–1942), Norwegian architect
- Pål Bang-Hansen (1937–2010), Norwegian actor
- Paul Bang (1879–1945), German politician and author
- Per Bang (1922–2010), Norwegian journalist
- Peter Bang (engineer) (1900–1957), Danish engineer
- Peter Fibiger Bang (born 1973), Danish comparative historian
- Peter Georg Bang (1797–1861), Danish politician and jurist
- Poul Bang (1905–1967), Danish film producer
- Ryan Bang (born 1991), South Korean actor and comedian
- Thomas Bang (born 1938), Danish sculptor
- Thomas Cathinco Bang (1827–1902), Norwegian politician
- Tove Bang (1904–1977), Danish actress
- Vivian Bang (born 1973), American actress

== See also ==
- Bangs (surname)
- Fang (surname)
