= Peter Bang =

Peter Bang may refer to:

- Peter Fibiger Bang (born 1973), Danish comparative historian
- Peter Georg Bang (1797–1861), Danish politician and jurist
- Peter Bang (engineer) (1900–1957), engineer and co-founder of Bang & Olufsen

== See also ==
- Per Bang (1922–2010), Norwegian journalist
