= Jack Levin =

Jack Levin may refer to:

- Jack Levin (hematologist), (1932-), hematologist
- Jack Levin (sociologist), sociologist and criminologist
- Jack Levin (producer) (1914–1999), American TV producer
