= Nykøbing =

Nykøbing means "new city". It may refer to several towns:

- Nykøbing Falster, on the island of Falster, Denmark
- Nykøbing Mors, on the island of Mors, Denmark
- Nykøbing Sjælland, on the island of Zealand (Sjælland), Denmark

== See also ==
- Nyköping, a locality and the seat of Nyköping Municipality, Södermanland County, Sweden
- Nyköping Municipality, a municipality in Södermanland County in southeast Sweden
