= Hyun-seok =

- Hangul: 현석
- RR: Hyeonseok
- MR: Hyŏnsŏk

Hyun-seok, also spelled Hyun-suk, is a Korean given name.

People with this name include:

- Dae Hyeonseok (fl. 871–895), King of Balhae
- Bang Hyeon-seok (born 1961), South Korean writer
- Noh Hyun-suk (born 1966), South Korean handball player
- Kim Hyun-seok (footballer) (born 1967), South Korean football player
- Yang Hyun-suk (born 1970), South Korean music executive
- Kim Hyun-seok (filmmaker) (born 1972), South Korean film director and screenwriter
- Yun Hyon-seok (1984–2003), South Korean LGBT activist
- Choi Hyun-suk (born 1999), South Korean rapper, member of boy band Treasure

== See also ==
- List of Korean given names
