= Oluf Lundt Bang =

Oluf Lundt Bang may refer to:

- Oluf Lundt Bang (lawyer) (1731–1789), Danish lawyer
- Ole Bang (1788–1877), Danish medical doctor
