= Jack Levin (hematologist) =

American physician

Jack Levin (born October 11, 1932) is an American physician-scientist and hematologist who, with Fred Bang, developed the Limulus amebocyte lysate (LAL) test for bacterial endotoxins.

== Biography ==
Jack Levin attended Yale School of Medicine (M.D.,1957). Levin joined the faculty of Johns Hopkins School of Medicine in 1965, transitioning to University of California School of Medicine in 1982.

His studies of blood coagulation in Limulus, the horseshoe crab, performed at the Marine Biological Laboratory (Woods Hole, MA), identified the key role of amebocytes, the only type of circulating blood cell in the horseshoe crab, in blood coagulation. His recognition of the sensitivity of amebocytes and subsequently of lysates prepared from washed amebocytes to bacterial endotoxins led to his original description of the Limulus amebocyte lysate (LAL) test for the detection of bacterial endotoxins in 1964.

His studies of the biological effects of bacterial endotoxins and utilization of the Limulus Test for detection of endotoxin in the blood of patients with various clinical disorders led to his receiving the Bang Award for research in bacterial endotoxins and to election as an honorary life member of the International Endotoxin and Innate Immunity Society. In 2014, Dr. Levin received a special award from the Parenteral Drug Association in recognition of the 50th anniversary of his initial description of the Limulus Amebocyte Lysate (LAL) test. In 2019, he received a Golden Goose Award from the American Association for the Advancement of Science (AAAS), which recognizes researchers whose seemingly obscure, federally funded research has led to major breakthroughs in biomedical research, medical treatments, and computing and communications technologies.

== Accomplishments and honors ==
- 1985: Inaugural recipient of the Frederik B. Bang Award for Research in Bacterial Endotoxins at the Johns Hopkins University School of Medicine.
- 1998-2004: Editor in Chief – Journal of Endotoxin Research (now Innate Immunity)
- 2005: Honorary Life Member of the International Endotoxin and Innate Immunity Society.
- 2007: Elected to Membership in the Johns Hopkins Society of Scholars.
- 2012: Yale School of Medicine Distinguished Service Award.
- 2014: Parenteral Drug Association conferred a special award on the 50th anniversary of the discovery and description of the LAL test.
- 2019: Golden Goose Award

== Selected publications ==
- Levin J, Bang FB. Clottable protein in Limulus: its localization and kinetics of its coagulation by endotoxin. Thromb Diath Haemorrh. 1968;19:186-197.
- Levin J, Tomasulo PA, Oser RS. Detection of endotoxin in human blood and demonstration of an inhibitor. J Lab Clin Med. 1970;75:903-911.
- Cooper JF, Levin J, Wagner HN Jr. Quantitative comparison of in vitro and in vivo methods for the detection of endotoxin. J Lab Clin Med. 1971;78:138-148.
- Levin J, Poore TE, Young NS, Margolis S, Zauber NP, Townes AS, Bell WR. Gram-negative sepsis: detection of endotoxemia with the Limulus test. With studies of associated changes in blood coagulation, serum lipids, and complement. Ann Intern Med. 1972;76:1-7.
- Young NS, Levin J, Prendergast RA. An invertebrate coagulation system activated by endotoxin: evidence for enzymatic mediation. J Clin Invest. 1972;51:1790-1797.
- Tomasulo PA, Levin J, Murphy PA, Winkelstein JA. Biological activities of tritiated endotoxins: correlation of the Limulus lysate assay with rabbit pyrogen and complement activation assays for endotoxin. J Lab Clin Med. 1977;89:308-315.
- Soderhall K, Levin J, Armstrong PB. The effects of β 1,3-glucans on blood coagulation and amebocyte release in the horseshoe crab, Limulus polyphemus. Biol Bull. 1985;169:661-674.
- Roth RI, Levin J, Behr S. A modified Limulus amebocyte lysate test with increased sensitivity for detection of bacterial endotoxin. J Lab Clin Med. 1989;114:306-311.
- Levin J. Discovery and early development of the Limulus test. In: Endotoxin Detection and Control in Pharma, Limulus, and Mammalian Systems KL Williams, Ed. Springer International Publishing AG, 2019, pp 3–15.
