= Frederik Ludvig Bang =

Danish medical doctor (1747–1820)

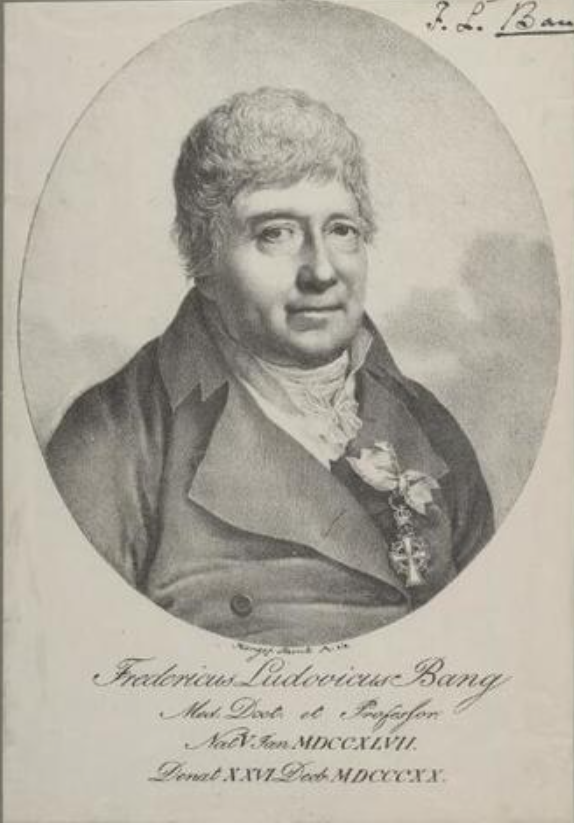
Frederik Ludvig Bang.

Frederik Ludvig Bang (5 January 1747 – 26 December 1820) was a Danish medical doctor. He succeeded Johan Christian Fabricius as chief physician at Frederick's Royal Hospital in 1775. He was the father of medical doctor Ole Bang, stepfather of bishop Jacob Peter Mynster and uncle of N.F.S. Grundtvig and Henrik Steffens.

== Early life and education ==
Bang was born at Egebjergg Parish at Nykøbing Sjælland, Holbæk County, the son of Niels Christian Bang (1697–1760) and Ulrikke Eleonore Schwane (1726–92). His father was manager of the royal estates in Odsherred.His mother was after the father's death married to his successor Jacob Hansen (1728–91). Bang matriculated from Herlufsholm School in 1761. He lived with his brother Oluf Lundt Bang, who was Attorney General and 16 years his senior, after the father's death.

Bang earned his Master of Medicine degree in 1767. He resided at Valkendorfs Kollegium from 1765 to 1768. In 1770, with the help of the Fincke's travel stipend and support from his brother, he was able to undertake a two-year trip abroad with stays in Berlin, Strasbourg and Paris. Shortly after returning home, on 24 February 1773,. he defended his dissertation on the medical use of vitriolic acid, which he had prepared abroad.

== Career ==
In 1774 he was employed as assistant physician (reservelæge) by the old chief physician Johan Christian Fabricius (1705–75), who needed help in his work at Frederick's Royal Hospital, and upon his death on 18 May 1775, he became the medical department's new chief physician. In this position, which he held for 25 years, he contributed greatly to practical medical science. On 29 May 1782 he also became an extraordinary professor at the University of Copenhagen and thus became the first senior physician to act as a teacher in his capacity as a university professor. Thereby, a more systematic clinical teaching, "teaching at the bedside", was introduced. In 1786 he became a member of the Collegium Medicum. In 1795, he also became a member of the board of Fredercik's hospital, and the Midwifery Commission. In 1803, he became a member of the Sundhedskollegiet. In 1806 he was elected as the university's chancellor.

His two most important publications were Selecta diarii Nosocomii Regii Fridericiani Hafniensis (I–II) and Praxis medica systematica exposita, selectis diarii Nosocomii Fridericiani illustrata. Both were translated into German shortly after their publication. His department was often visited by foreign doctors.

Ge retired from the hospital on 9 August 1800 and in that connection was appointed as ordinary professor at the university.

== Religious interests ==
After his retirement from the hospital, Bang spent still more of his time on theological questions. He was an opponent of the then prevailing rationalist trends and professed a strict pietism. He published several religious writings. He also translated Bible texts into Latin hexameters (Viisdoms Lærdomme og Leveregler uddragne af Salomons og Sirachs Skrifter, 1819).

== Personal life ==
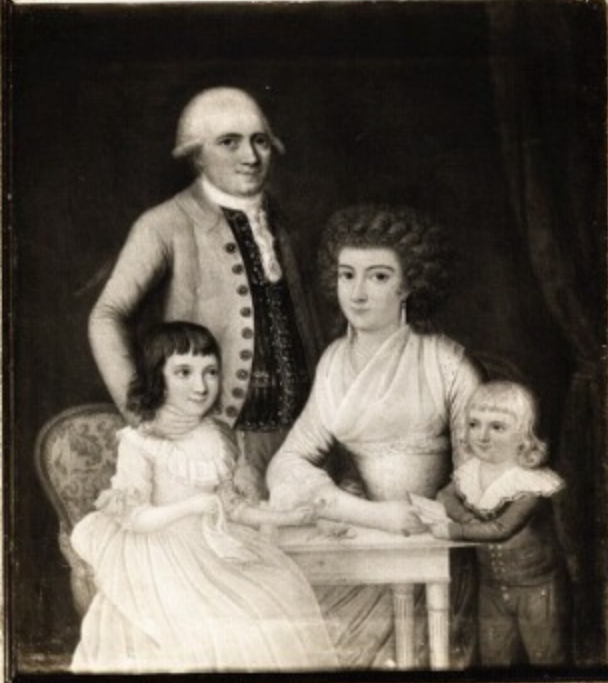
Frederik Lydvig Bang with family.

On 17 October 1777, Bang married Frederikke Nicoline Christiane Mynster, (1749–1779). the daughter of inspectpr at Frederick's Hospital Hieronymus Ring (died 1771) and Karen Sophie Rosengaard (died 1793) and the widow of Christian Gutzon Peter Mynster, 1741–77). After her death, on 24 September 1779, he married Ingeborg Mohrum, /née Madsen, 1754–1781), daughter of brewer and merchant Lars Madsen (c. 1720–81) and Anna Catharina Berthelsdatter and the widow of naval captain Niels Mohrum, died 1779). On 10 January 1782, he married Lovise Hansen (1765–1845), daughter of pastor at the Church of the Holy Ghost Mouritz Hansen (1722–77) and Anna Dorothea Muus (1727–99).

During the British bombardment of Copenhagen in 1807, his professor's residence (Fiolstræde 4–6) burned and with it his books, papers and the diary he had kept for many years. Bang's home at Frederik's Hospital was one of the meeting places for the youth people who would later become of great importance to Denmark's spiritual life at the turn of the century. Bang's stepsons, the two brothers J. P. Mynster and O. G. Mynster, belonged to the Bakkehuset circle. N.F.S. Grundtvig and Henrik Steffens were Bang's nephews, and through O. H. Mynster, the latter came into contact with the young Adam Oehlenschläger.

Bang died on 26 December 1820. He is buried at Assistens Cemetery.

== Awards ==
In 1811, Bang was awarded the title of etatsråd. In 1815, he was created a Knight of the Order of the Dannebrog. In 1826, he was awarded the Cross of Honour. In 1828, he was created a Knight's Commander. In 1836, he was awarded the Grand Cross.
