= Oluf Lundt Bang (lawyer) =

OlOluf Lundt Bang (11 September 1731 – 27 September 1789), also known as Ole Bang, was a Danish lawyer who ended his career as president of Hof- og Stadsretten. During the Struense affair, he served both as prosecutor in the trial against queen Caroline Matilda and as defence attorney in the trial against Enevold Brandt. In 1777, he was ennobled under the name de Bang. He was the father of playwright Baltsasar Bang and landowner Niels Bang.

== Early life and education ==
Bang was born at Egebjerggaard at Nykøbing Sjælland, Holbæk County, the son of Niels Christian Bang (1697–1760) and Cathrine Marie Kjær (ca. 1704–43). His father managed the royal estates in Odsherred. He was after his first wife's death married at Annebjerggaard to Ulrikke Eleonore Schwane (1726–92). She was after his death married to his successor Jacob Hansen (1728–91). He was the half-brother of the medical doctor Frederik Ludvig Bang.

Bang matriculated from Frederiksborg Latin School in 1747. He earned a Master of Theology degree from the University of Copenhagen in 1750 and a Master of Law degree in 1753.

== Career ==
In 1758, he was licensed as a Supreme Court attorney. 1763 saw him appointed as Attorney-General (kammeradvokat). During the Struense affair, he both served as prosecutor in the trial against the queen and as defense attorney for Enevold Brandt. In 1779, he was appointed as debuty general prosecutor (vicegeneralprokurør). In 1790, he was appointed as assessor in kancellikollegiet and an extraordinary judge at the Supreme Court. 1784 saw him promoted to general prosecutor (generalprokurør) and in 1788 he was appointed as president of Hof- og Stadsretten.

As a member of the Overbankdirektionen, in 1783–88, with a short interruption in 1784, he opposed the new monetary system in the duchies of 1788, maintaining that it favoured the duchies at the expense of the kingdom. In 1786, he became a member of the Great Agricultural Commission. In the same year, in its second meeting, he presented a report on the farmer's legal position, which with regard to the stavnsbånd and mandatory labour (hoveri) represented a moderate reform position, but which also contained sharp expressions about the treatment of the tenant farmers and demanded that the right to probate over the farmers be completely taken away from the landowner. The report was simultaneously published in print as Treatise on the Peasant Estate and (Afhandling om Bondestanden) provoked a number of fierce attacks from reform opponents. Bang's other writing consists mainly of legal dissertations.

== Awards ==
In 1773, Bang was awarded the title of justitsråd. In 1777, Bang was ennobled under the name de Bang. In 1779, he was appointed as etatsråd. In 1783, he was appointed as konferensråd.uncil 1783.

== Personal life ==
On 25 August 1762, Bang married Anthonette Frederica Horn (1741-1773). She was the daughter of lawyer and poet Frederik Horn ((1708–81) and Jeanne Antoinette Greben (died 1742). On 4 August 1773, he married Else Marie Thecou (1735-1802). She was the daughter of grocer Niels S. (1706–74) and Antoinette Boertmann (1712–35), and the widow of brewer Nicolai T., 1732–62),

He was survived by two sons and a daughter. The eldest son Niels Banf owned the estates Benzonsdal and Sparresholm.. His younger brother Balthasar Band was a playwright. Their sister Antoinette Frederikke de Bang married the lawyer Freiherr Christian Ulrich Detlev von Eggers.

== See also ==
- Oluf Lundt Ban
