= Jacob Peter Mynster =

- Bishop of Zealand
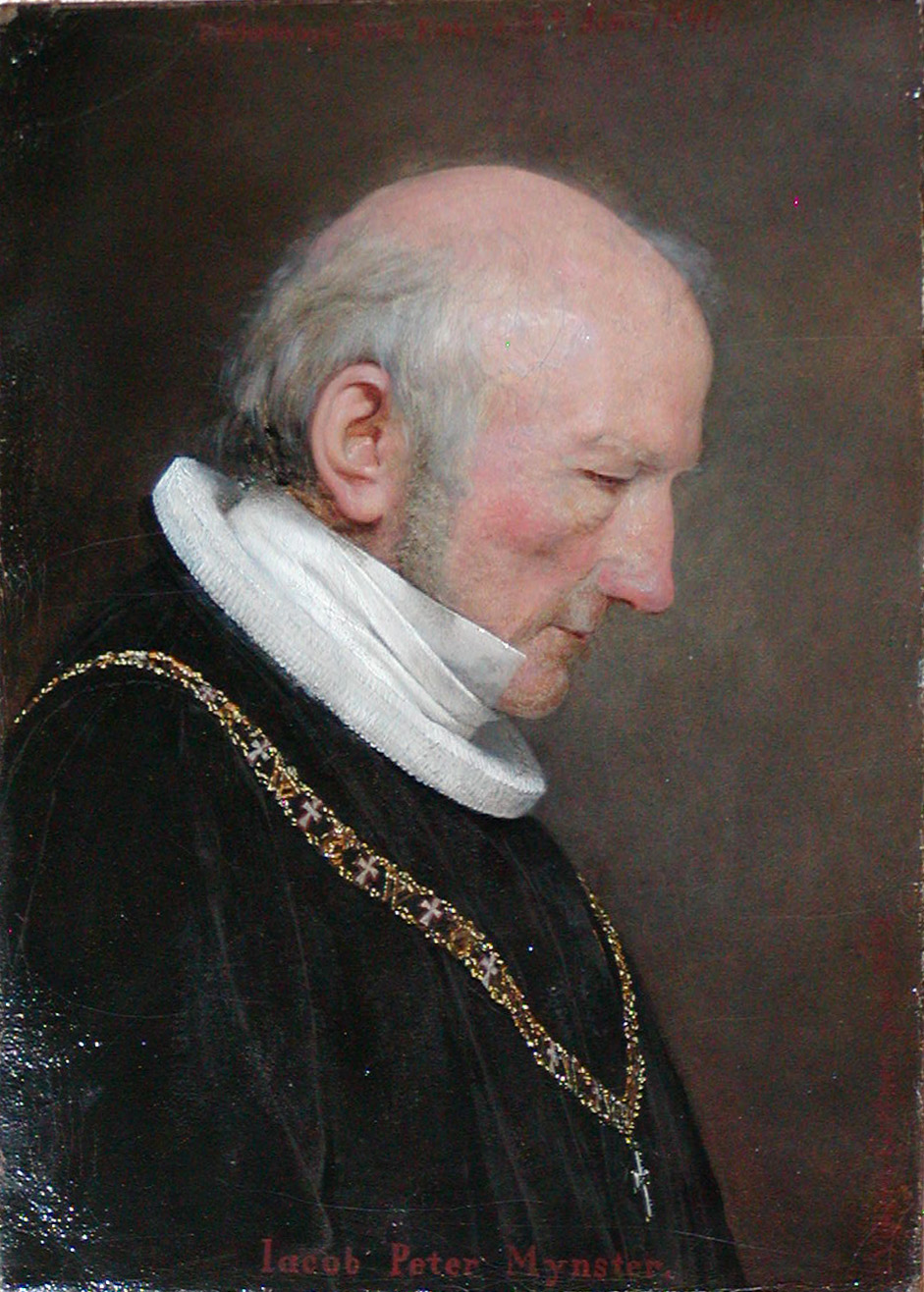
- Bishop Jacob Peter Mynster. Portrait by Johan Vilhelm Gertner.
- Church: Church of Denmark
- In office: 1834–1854
- Predecessor: Peter Erasmus Müller
- Successor: Hans Lassen Martensen

Personal details
- Born: 8 November 1775 Copenhagen, Denmark
- Died: 30 January 1854 (aged 78)
- Denomination: Lutheranism
- Parents: Christian Gudzon Peter Mynster; Frederica Christiane Nicoline (née Ring)
- Spouse: Maria Frederica Franzisca ("Fanny") Münter
- Children: Marie Elizabeth Paulli; Christian Ludvig Nicolai Mynster
- Education: University of Copenhagen; Cand.theol., 1794; Doctor of Theology, 1815

Jacob Peter Mynster (8 November 1775 – 30 January 1854) was a Danish theologian and clergy member of the Church of Denmark. He served as Bishop of the Diocese of Zealand from 1834 until his death. He was a member of the Danish Constituent Assembly.

Mynster was notably used as an exemplar of conservative religion by Søren Kierkegaard in his book Attack Upon Christendom.

== Early life and education ==
Mynster was born on 8 November 1775 in Copenhagen. His father, Christian Gudzon Peter Mynster, was a Chamber Councillor (kammerråd) and inspector at Frederiks Hospital. His mother was named Frederica Christiane Nicoline (née Ring). His father died in 1777 of tuberculosis, and his mother was remarried to Frederik Ludvig Bang, a doctor who was superintendent of the same hospital as her first husband. Mynster's mother died shortly thereafter of tuberculosis in 1779, and he and his brother Ole Hieronymus Mynster, who was three years his senior, were then brought up by their stepfather.

Their stepfather was a wealthy and well respected medical doctor who was superintendent of the same hospital as their birthfather. Bang was later widowed by the death of his second wife, Louise (née Hansen), whom he married in 1782. In his stepfather's household, Mynster was raised following pietism which was commonplace in Denmark at the time. According to Mynster, his stepfather was incredibly strict and his pietic views often went against the church's doctrine.

During his childhood, Mynster was largely taught by private tutors. One of his tutors gave him the nickname "Job" after the biblical prophet: a nickname which he went by for much of his life. When not being privately taught at his home, Mynster briefly attended the Metropolitanskolen where he was tutored by an uncle.

As a student at the University of Copenhagen, Mynster associated with fellow students such as Henrik Steffens and Jens Wilken Hornemann whose ideas contributed to his spiritual development. In 1794, he received a Cand.theol. degree in theology. Immediately after graduating, Mynster was employed as a tutor to Adam Wilhelm Moltke. He later received a doctorate in theology in 1815.

== Career ==
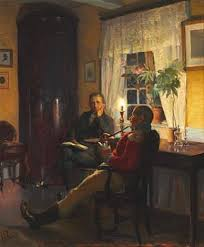
"Accommodation at J.P. Mynster's in Spjellerup rectory" by Carl Thomsen

He began his first position as a priest in 1802 in Spjellerup, a small parish south of Copenhagen. While there, he was confronted by contradictions between his faith and the dogma of the church he was preaching in. Following a religious breakthrough in 1803, Mynster became outspoken about his own beliefs. His writings and the publications of his sermons from this period gained him attention, and he received a position back in Copenhagen as a chaplain at the Church of Our Lady.

While in Copenhagen, he was a lecturer in psychology at Pastoralseminarium, a theological seminary, of which he became co-director in 1812. In 1814 he elaborated the basis for the version of Luther's Small Catechism which was authorized for use in Danish schools. In 1815, Mynster married Fanny Münter, the daughter of Friedrich Münter, a former Bishop of Zealand. Through her father, he was given status and station. In particular, he became a member of the commission tasked with revision of the New Testament and he became a member of the University of Copenhagen. In 1819, Mynster became a member of the Royal Danish Academy of Sciences and Letters.

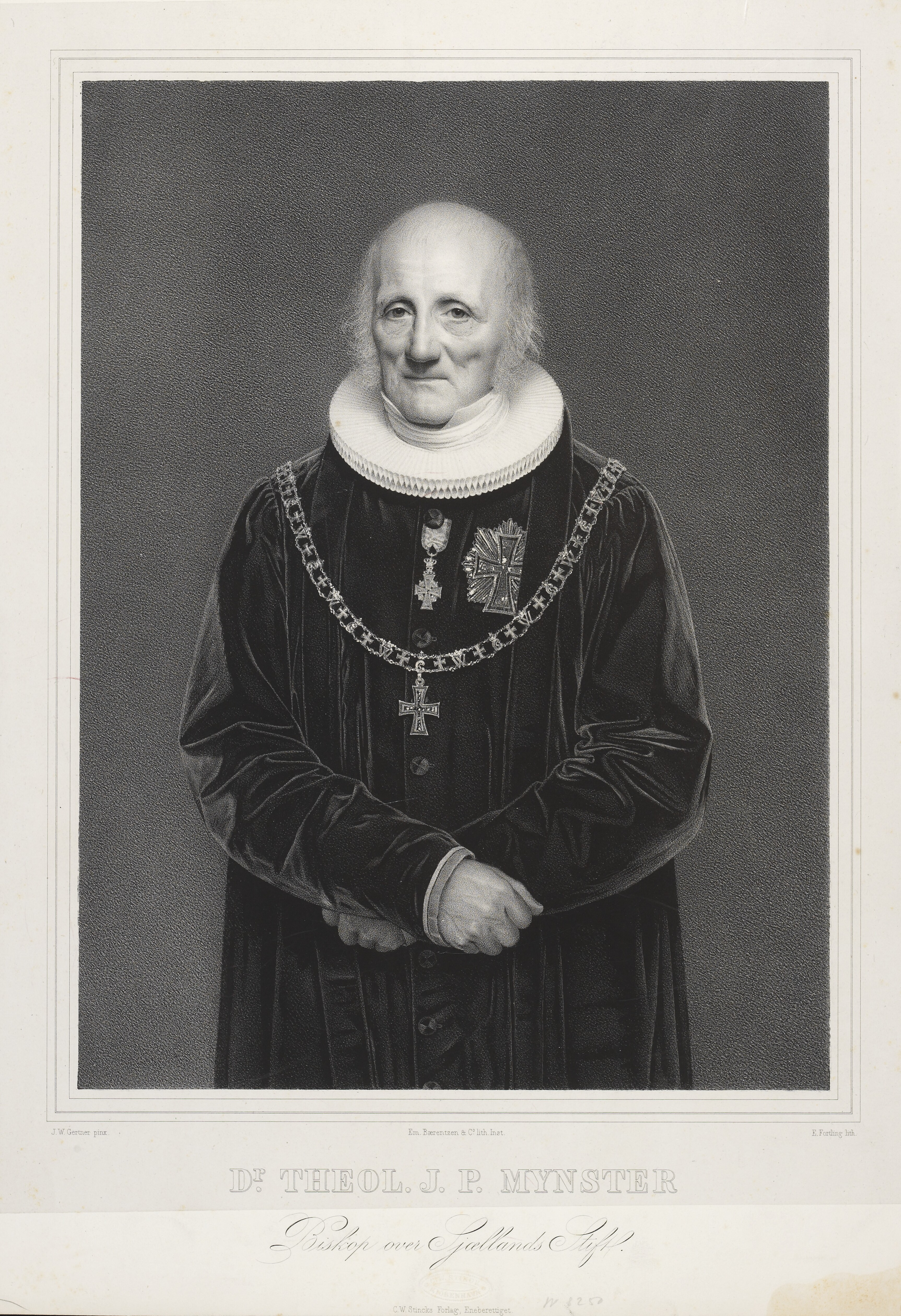
J. W. Gertner: Dr. Theol. Jakob Peter Mynster.

In 1826, Mynster was appointed the court chaplain at Christiansborg Palace where he served as confessor to King Frederick VI. In 1828, he was appointed a commander of the Order of the Dannebrog. He became a member of the Royal Mission College in 1834, and was director of the college's orphanage. As an elected member of the royal Stænderforsamlingerne he met in Roskilde in 1835, 1838, 1840, 1842, 1844, and 1848. He later received the Grand Cross in 1836, and was awarded the rank of 1st class of the order in 1847. He was also made a member of the Danish Constituent Assembly by royal appointment.

Mynster was appointed Bishop of Zealand on 9 September 1834. This followed the death of his father-in-law, Bishop Friedrich Münter, and his successor Peter Erasmus Müller. Mynster remained in office until his death in 1854. He was succeeded as Bishop of Zealand by Hans Lassen Martensen.

== Relationship to Kierkegaard ==
While serving as a chaplain at Our Lady Church, Mynster was introduced to the Kierkegaard family, who were members of the congregation. He had an amicable relationship with Michael Pedersen Kierkegaard. In later years, his beliefs were criticized by Michael Kierkegaard's son, Søren Kierkegaard. Mynster was one of the principal objects of scorn in his book Attack Upon Christendom. Although their beliefs differed, Søren Kierkegaard had some respect for Mynster and only published his direct criticisms of Mynster after the Bishop's death so as to spare him.

Søren's brother, Peter Kierkegaard, was briefly a pastor under Mynster's authority as the bishop of Zealand. In an incident in 1842, Peter defied Mynster and refused to baptize Baptist children against their will.

== Personal life ==
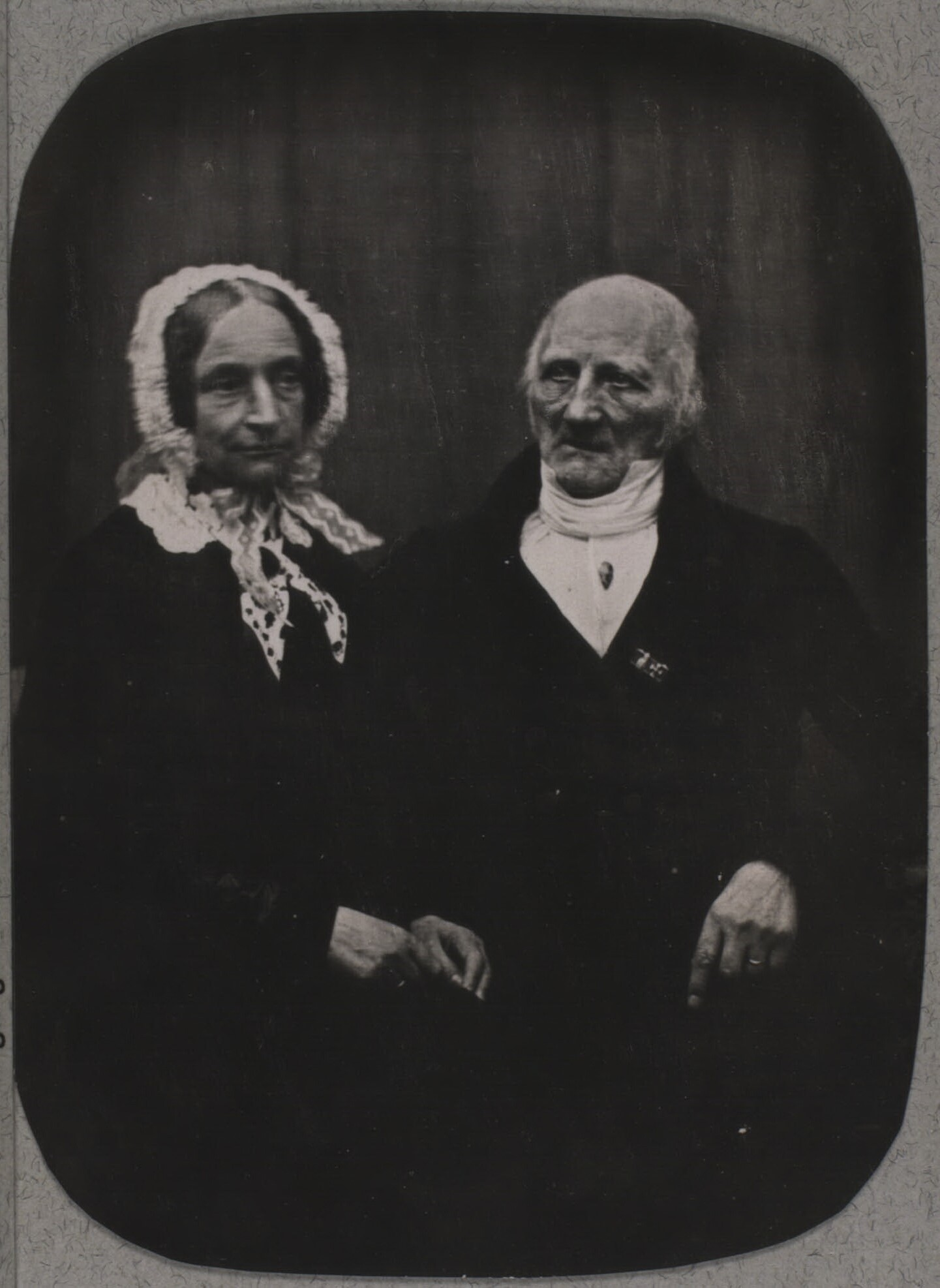
Fanny and Jakob Peter Mtnster.

In 1815, Mynster married Maria Frederica Franzisca Münter. Maria was born in 1796 and went by the name "Fanny". She was the daughter of former bishop Friederich Christian Carl Hinrich Münter and Maria Elisabeth Krohn. The wedding was celebrated at her aunt Friederike Brun's country house Sophienholm. The couple had five children of which two sons and two daughters lived to adulthood. The elder of their two sons, Frederik Joachim Mynster, was born in 1816 and died in 1857. He received a degree in theology at the University of Copenhagen and served as pastor at Holmen Church. The younger son, Christian Ludvig Nicolai Mynster, was born on 19 March 1820 and died in 1883. Like his father and elder brother, he received a degree in theology at the University of Copenhagen where he was later a professor. He was an author and historian, and compiled many works about the lives of his notable relatives, especially his father, including:

- Nogle Erindringer og Bemærkninger om J.P. Mynster (1877)
- Breve fra J.P. Mynster (1860)
- Nogle Blade af J.P. Mynsters Liv og Tid (1875)

The eldest daughter, Marie Elizabeth, was born on 25 October 1822. In 1842 she married a noted pastor and close associate of her father's, Just Henrik Voltelen Paulli, with whom she had three sons.

Mynster became a member of the Royal Danish Academy of Sciences and Letters in 1819.

In January 1854, Mynster complained of a pain in his chest, but decided not to seek medical attention. He died shortly thereafter on January 30. He is buried at Assistens Cemetery.

== Commemoration ==
An epitaph to Mynster by Christian Tubjerg was installed in Our Lady's Church in 1854. It features a portrait relief by Jens Adolf Jerichau. A colossal bronze bust of Mynster created by Theobald Stein was installed on the north side of the same church on Frue Plads in 1875, opposite the main entrance to the University of Copenhagen's main building. It stands next to two other busts, depicting Christoph Ernst Friedrich Weyse (1863, Herman Wilhelm Bissen), who served as organist at the church, and Martensen (1888, Theovald Stein), Mynster's successor, respectively. A statue of Mynster by Johannes Bjerg was installed outside Frederik's Church in 1911. It is part of a series of statues of prominent ecclesiastical leaders surrounding the church.

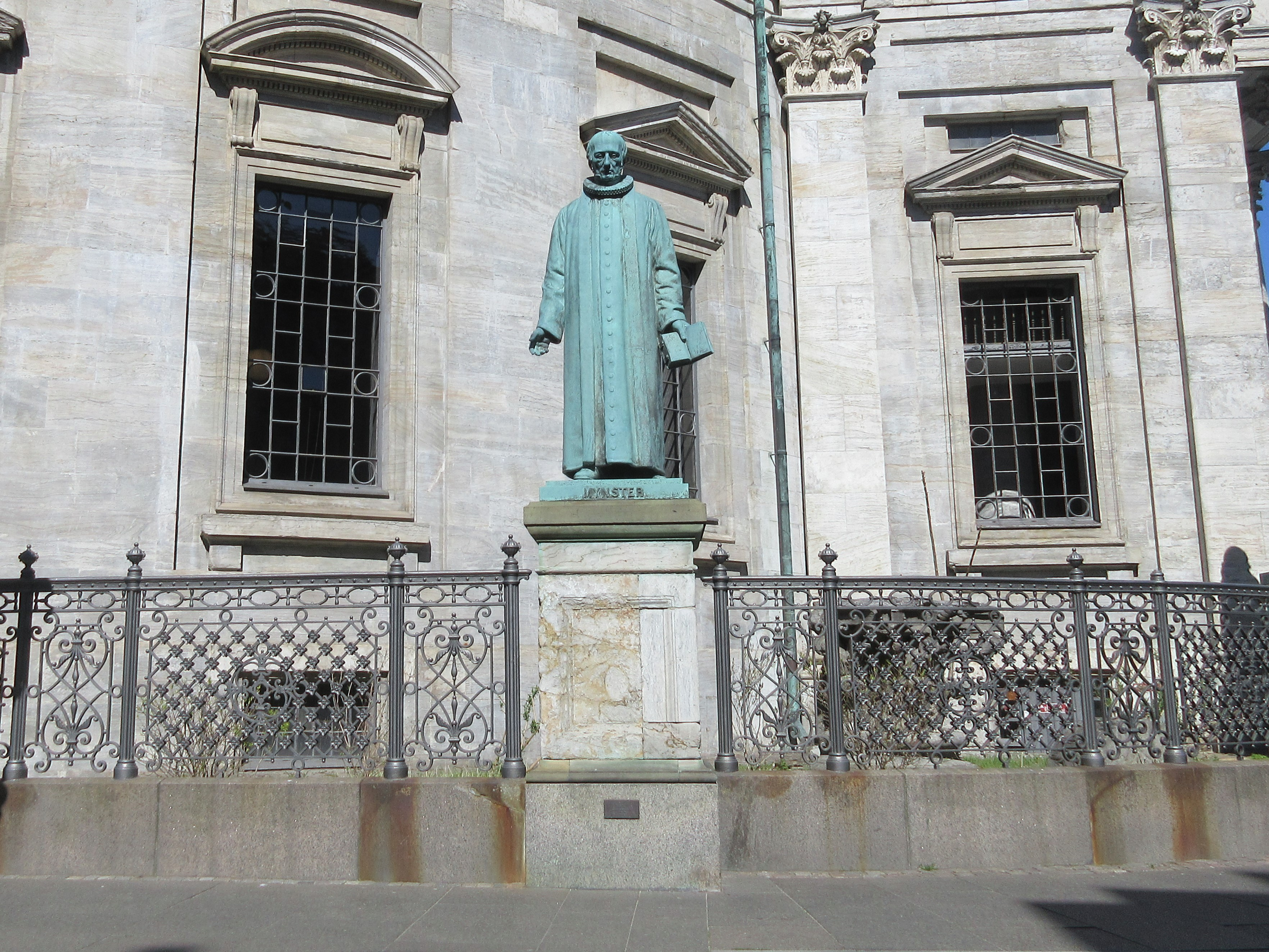
Statue of Mynster outside Frederick's Church in Copenhagen.

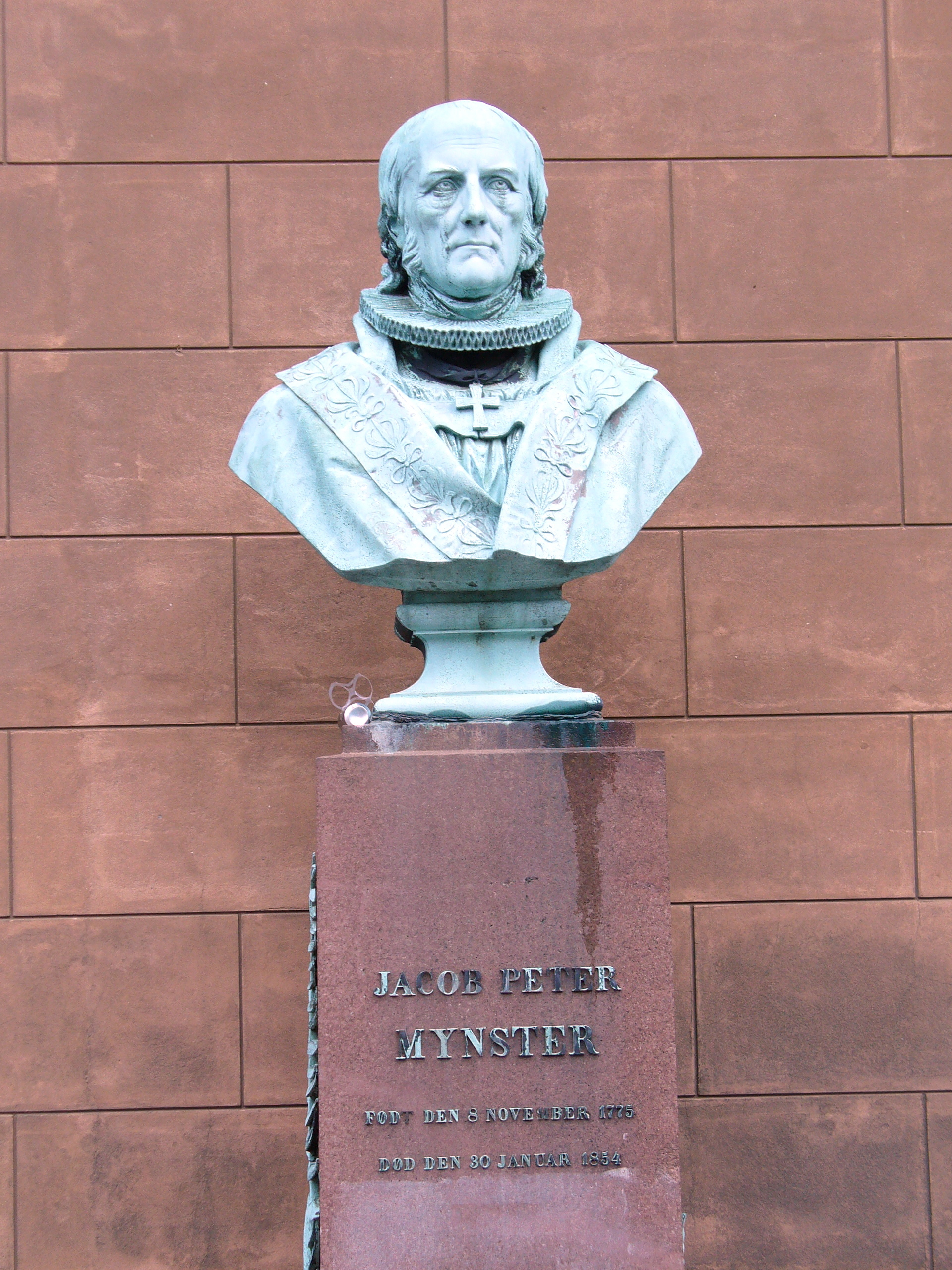
The bust of Mynster on Frue Plads in Copenhagen.

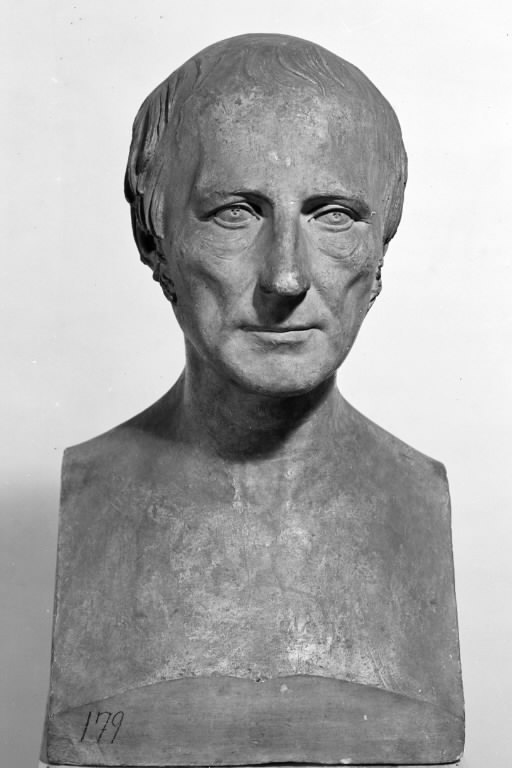
Bust of Mynster by German Wilhelm Bissen, National Gallery of Denmark.

== Bibliography ==
Many of Mynster's sermons were transcribed and published for the public. He also produced a number of works on theology and the church, some of which were published posthumously.

- Prædikener paa alle Søn- og Hallige-Dage i Aaret (Sermons for Every Sunday and Holiday in the Year). Copenhagen: Gyldendal. 1823.
- Kleine theologische Schriften. Copenhagen. 1825
- Om Begrebet af den christelige Dogmatik. Copenhagen: Gyldendal. 1831.
- Betragtninger over de christelige Troeslærdomme (Observations on the Doctrines of the Christian Faith). Copenhagen: Gyldendal. 1833.
- Kirkelige Leiligheds-taler. Copenhagen: Hans Reitzels Forlag. 1854.
- Meddelelser om mit Levnet. Copenhagen: Gyldendal. 1854.
- Blandede Skrifter. Copenhagen: Gyldendal. 1856
