= Anna Grue =

Danish crime writer (born 1957)

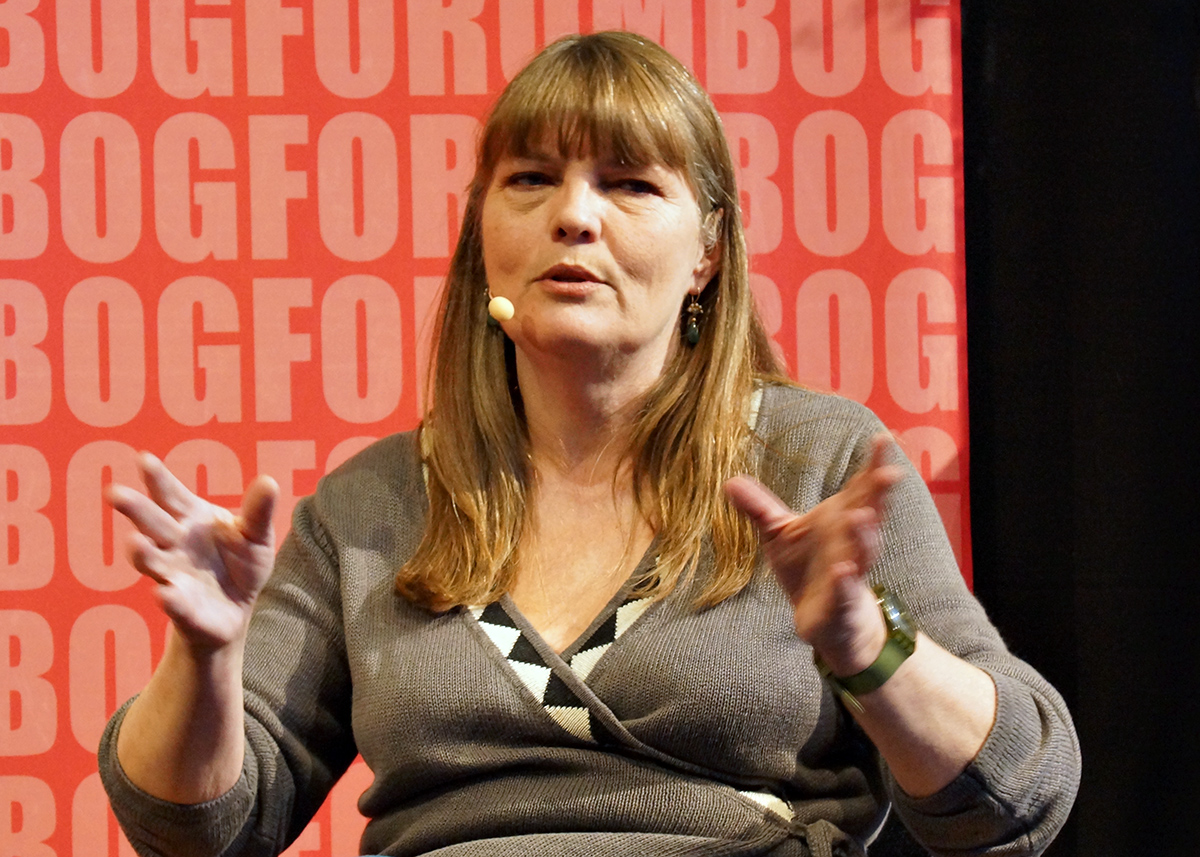
- Born: June 22, 1957; Nykøbing Sjælland, Denmark
- Education: Skolen for Brugskunst (School of Applied Arts)
- Occupation: Novelist
- Spouse: Jesper Christiansen
- Writing career
- Period: 2005-present
- Genre: Mystery
- Notable work: Dan Sommerdahl series (basis of the TV series The Sommerdahl Murders)
- Website: annagrue.dk

Anna Grue (born 22 June 1957 in Nykøbing Sjælland) is a Danish crime writer. The most voluminous part of her published works is the crime series about detective Dan Sommerdahl. In addition, she has written other novels and short stories. She is one of Denmark's most-read crime writers. She became well known in English-speaking countries when her Sommerdahl books were made into the television series The Sommerdahl Murders, starring Peter Mygind.

== Early life and education ==
Grue was born in Nykøbing Sjælland. In 1960, the family moved to Randers and a few years later to Aalborg, where she received a new language matriculation exam from Hasseris Gymnasium. She was then admitted to the Skolen for Brugskunst (School of Applied Arts), where she studied drawing and graphics, and graduated in 1981.

== Early career ==
After her education, Grue worked for a number of years in the news and magazine industry. She started doing layouts in the development department at Fogtdals Blade. In 1983, she moved to Bo Bedre (“Live Better”). She began writing text in 1986, when Christianshavns Reklamebureau hired her as art director and copywriter. The following year, she served as editorial secretary and cover editor at the Danish tabloid BT. In 1991, she joined Allerkoncernen as editor-in-chief on the music magazine Mix. She started Forældre & Børn (“Parents & Children”) and served as editor-in-chief of this magazine for a number of years before Aller made her editor-in-chief of the weekly Søndag (“Sunday”) in 1999. In 2001, she started the monthly magazine Bazar and was editor-in-chief of the magazine until she left Aller in 2005, when she started the magazine Vi med hund (“We and Dog”) for JSL Publications.

== Writing career ==
Grue published her debut novel, Noget for noget (Something for Something), with the publishing house Forlaget Aschehoug in 2005, for which she was given a diploma from Det Danske Kriminalakademi (The Danish Criminal Academy), an association for the dissemination and promotion of good suspense literature in Denmark. Her subsequent books are published by Politikens Forlag.

Grue's inspiration to become a crime writer began at home. Because her mother worked as a psychiatrist, everything from blood to brain lesions was talked about at the dinner table. At the same time, the young Grue read many detective stories, which she borrowed from a friend of her mother's.

Grue's popularity can be seen in the amount of her bibliotekspenge (literally, library money, a cultural grant provided by the Danish Parliament): in 2014, she made the biggest leap on the list of recipients, receiving over 100,000 kroner more than in 2013. In total, she received 282,113 kroner in 2014, putting her in 55th place. That same year, she was nominated for the Martha Prize, awarded by the bookstore chain Bog & idé (Book & idea).

Grue is also a lecturer and has participated on the panel of the TV program Smagsdommerne (The Taste Judges).

In 1981, Grue married Jesper Christiansen, a painter, graphic artist, and former professor at the Royal Danish Academy of Fine Arts. They have three children.
