= Bangs (surname) =

Bangs is a surname. Notable people with the surname include:

- Alan Bangs (born 1951), music journalist and radio presenter
- Courtney Bangs, American politician
- David Bangs, field naturalist, conservationist and author
- Francis S. Bangs (1855–1920), American lawyer
- John Kendrick Bangs (1862–1922), writer
- Lester Bangs (1948–1982), American music journalist
- Lance Bangs (born 1972), American filmmaker
- Nan Bangs McKinnell (1913–2012), known commonly as Nan Bangs, American ceramicist
- Outram Bangs (1863–1932), American zoologist
- Ryan Bangs (1984–present), American Gemologist/Jeweler/Philanthropist

== See also ==
- Bang (surname)
