= The Grey Lady and the Strawberry Snatcher =

1980 children's book by Molly Bang

- Author: Molly Bang
- Language: English
- Genre: children's literature, wordless book
- Published: 1980
- Publisher: Four Winds Press/Macmillan Publishing Company
- Publication place: United States

The Grey Lady and the Strawberry Snatcher is a children's wordless picture book by Molly Bang, published in 1980 by Four Winds Press/Macmillan Publishing Company. The book was a recipient of the 1981 Caldecott Honor.

== Plot ==
A grey lady buys strawberries from the market and heads home to her family with them. A long fingered blue creature follows her and tries to steal the strawberries, but she escapes through various means—catching a bus, swinging from a vine, and simply by blending into the grey swamp but for her face and hands. When he gets frustrated, he finds blackberries and eats them instead.

== Reception ==
A Chevron Cars review says, The Grey Lady and the Strawberry Snatcher by Molly Bang has superb illustrations with the grey lady becoming part of the environment, hidden from the viewer as well as from the strawberry snatcher." A Teaching Pre K-8 review says, "Dive into this story when you have plenty of time. Every page presents possibilities for wondering, discussing and anticipating. That's the way to get kids hooked on books." Carol Hurst reviewed the book saying, "The artist's use of figure/ground manipulation is central to the plot and can be used as an introduction to other art activities using negative and positive space". The book was used as a project in the book Math & Stories. The book won a 1981 Caldecott Honor Book award, a 1980 Boston Globe-Horn Book honor book award for Illustration, A Children's Reviewer's Choice 1980 award, ALA Booklist award, a 1980 AIGA Children's Book Show Selection award.
