= Stine Andersen (sport shooter) =

Danish sports shooter (born 1985)

Stine Andersen OLY
Personal information
- Full name: Stine Myrhøj Andersen
- Born: 16 January 1985 (age 41) Nykøbing Sjælland, Denmark

Sport
- Sport: Sports shooting

Stine Andersen (born 16 January 1985) is a Danish sports shooter. She competed in the Women's 10 metre air rifle event at the 2012 Summer Olympics.
