= Johan Vilhelm Gertner =

Danish painter (1818–1871)

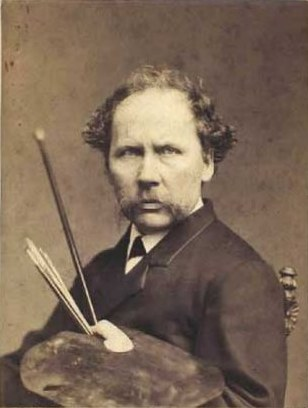
Gertner

Johan Vilhelm Gertner (10 March 1818 – 28 March 1871) was a Danish painter, best known for his lifelike portraiture. One of the last students of Christoffer Wilhelm Eckersberg, who was known as the father of the Golden Age of Danish Painting, Gertner belonged to the tail end of the Golden Age, a period during which Danish art moved towards a more realistic style, relying on inspiration both from French Realism and emerging photographic techniques.

== Life and career ==
Gertner was born to a craftsman at the Holmen Naval Base. He attended the Royal Danish Academy of Fine Arts from 1831 to 1837 where he was one of the pupils of Christoffer Wilhelm Eckersberg, known as the father of the Golden Age of Danish Painting. Eckersberg taught him a naturalistic approach to painting, but Gertner went much further with inspiration from French art and the emerging techniques of photography.

His virtuosity in producing almost photographically precise portraits impressed many; in particular, his ability to reproduce textures and materials — crisp silk dresses, lustrous medals and jewellery, dark mahogany furniture, silky wallpapers, and soft carpets — won him much acclaim. Others, such as the influential art historian and critic Niels Lauritz Høyen, who opposed any foreign influence on Danish painting, disapproved of his style, preferring more sincere and sensitive portrayals. He was a professor at the Academy from 1858.

== Works ==
Gertner painted many of the leading artists of his time, including Bertel Thorvaldsen in Thorvaldsen in his studio (1839, Thorvaldsens Museum) and C.W. Eckersberg (1850, Royal Danish Academy). Occasionally he also painted genre works, history painting or architecture pieces.

== Selected portraits ==
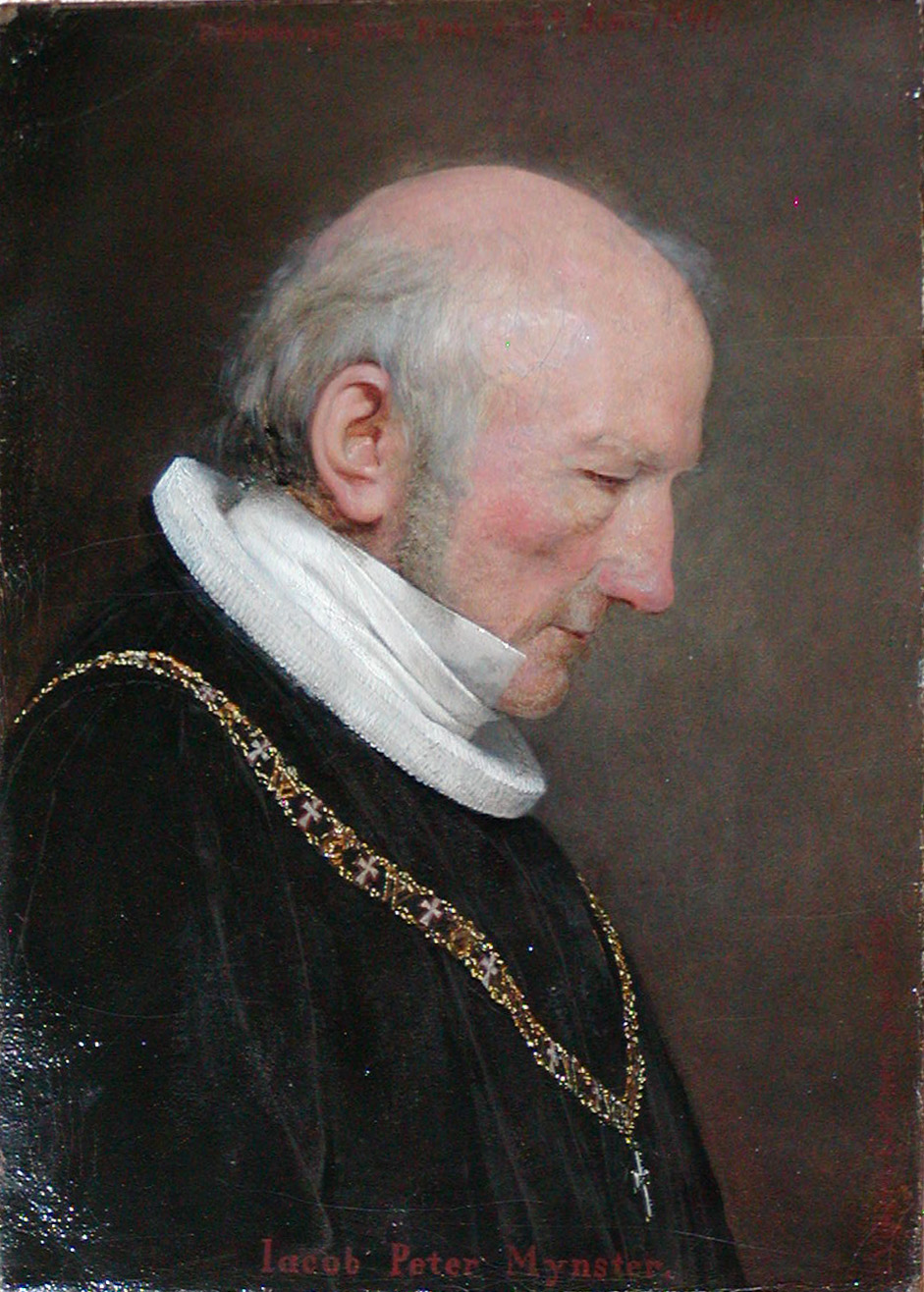
Jacob Peter Mynster

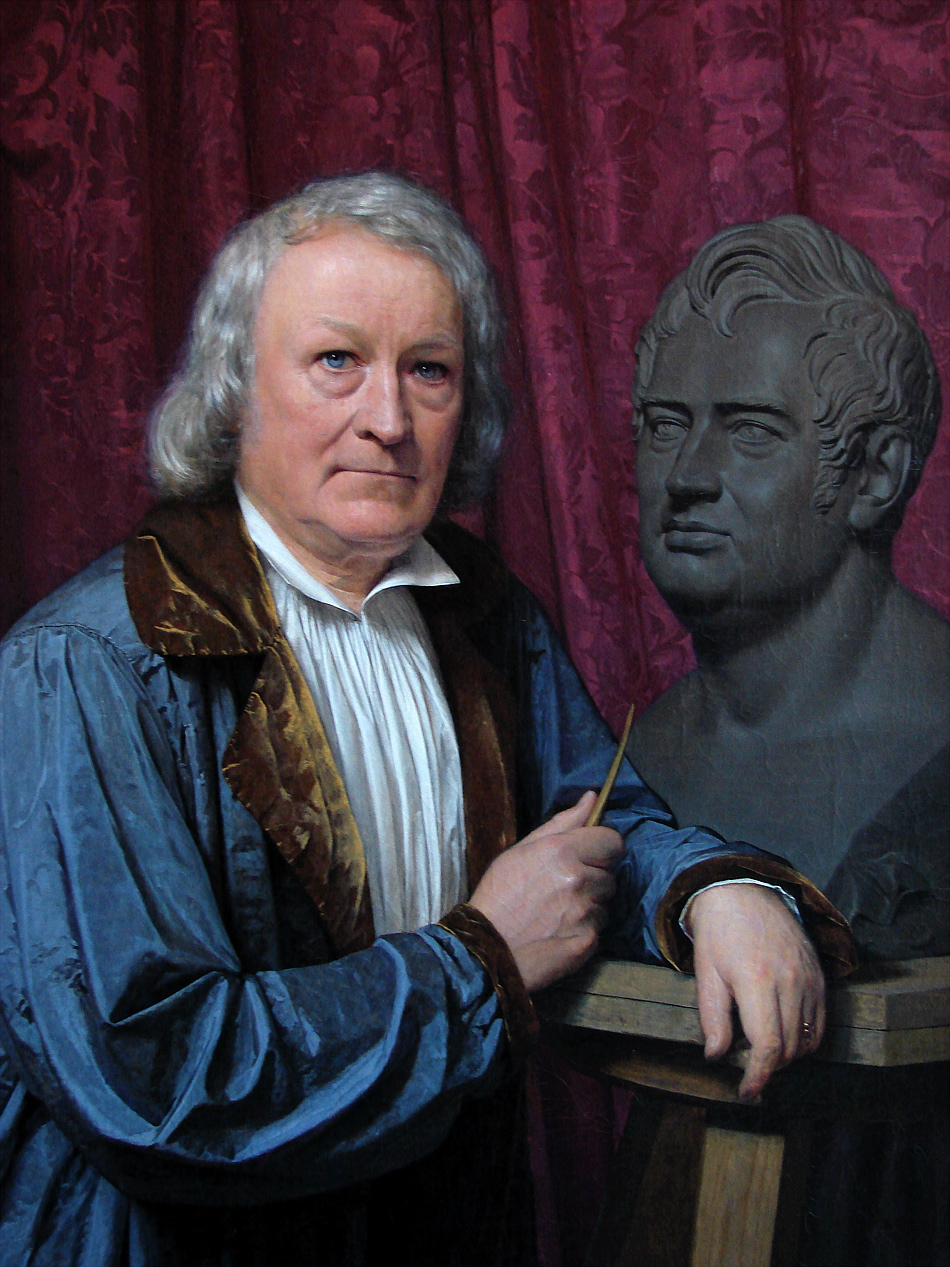
Bertel Thorvaldsen

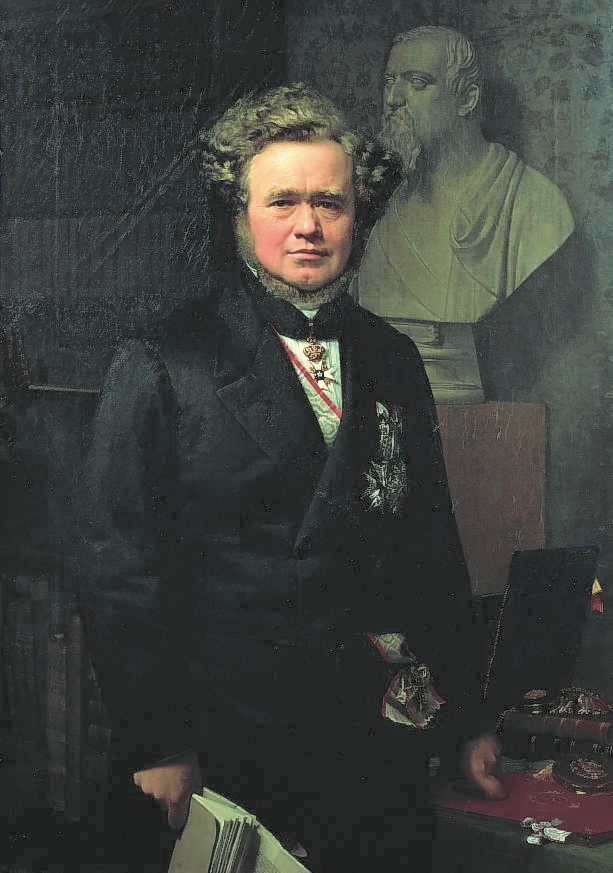
Carl Christian Hall

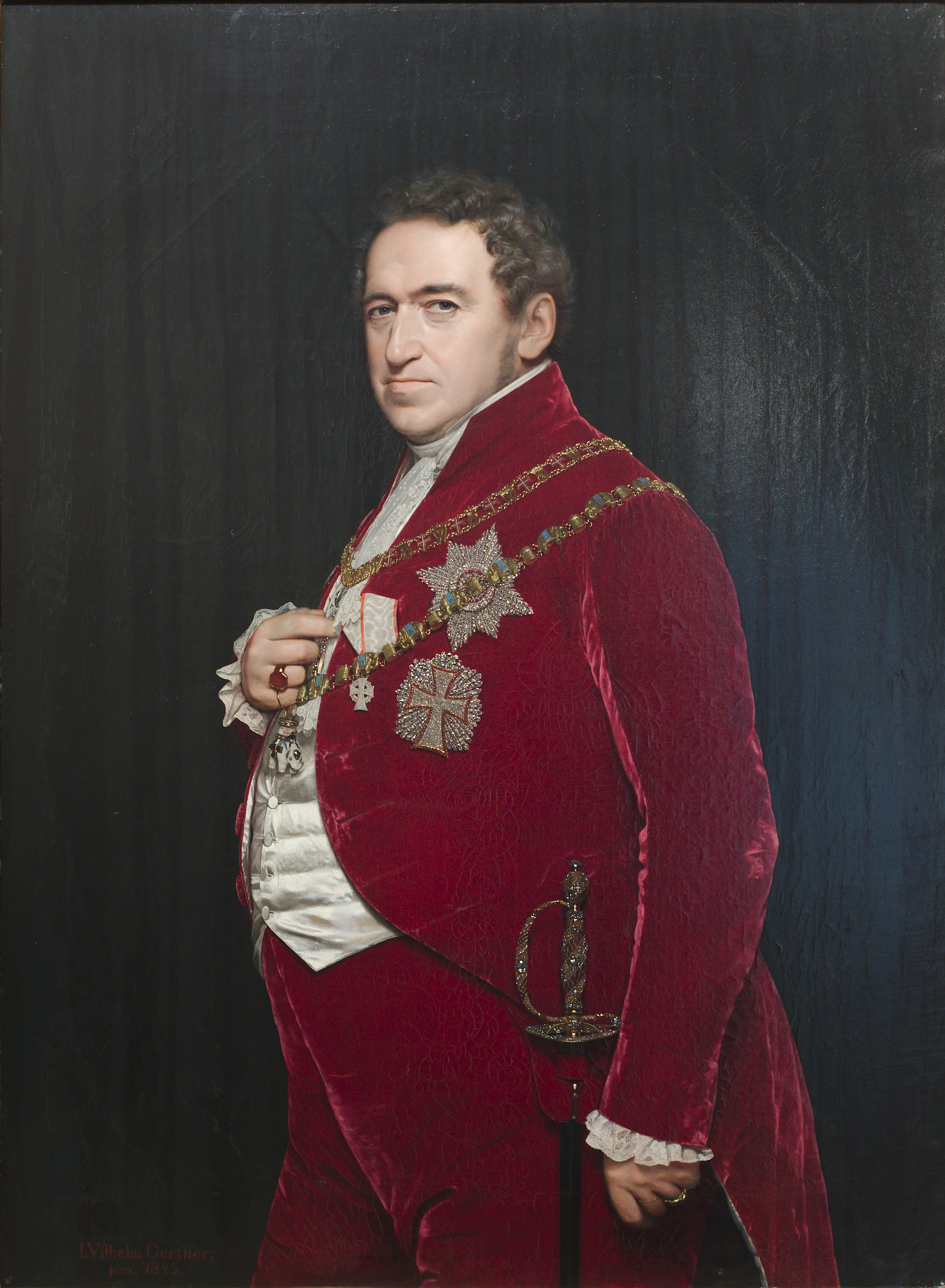
King Christian VIII

== Exhibitions ==
- Nivaagaard Painting Collection, Johan Vilhelm Gertner, 2 September – 18 November 2001

== See also ==
- List of Danish painters
- Art of Denmark
