= Betsy Bang =

Biologist, illustrator and translator

- Fred and Betsy Bang at a Comparative Pathology of Marine Invertebrates course at the Marine Biological Laboratory in 1980
- Born: Betsy Garrett; 1912
- Died: October 31, 2003 (aged 90–91); Woods Hole, Massachusetts
- Occupations: Biologist, scientific/medical illustrator
- Known for: establishing that birds have a sense of smell
- Spouse: Fred Bang
- Children: Caroline (1941–1996), Axel, and Molly

Betsy Bang née Garrett (1912–2003) was an American biologist, scientific and medical illustrator. She also translated folk tales from Bengali to English. Her scientific work was notable for her finding that many bird species have a sense of smell, a question that had long remained unsettled. Her works included Functional Anatomy of the Olfactory System in 23 Orders of Birds, published in 1971.

== Biography ==
Born in Lancaster, North Carolina, Betsy Garrett was raised in Washington, D.C., enrolled in public schools there and earned her bachelor's degree from George Washington University in 1933.

She moved to Baltimore and studied medical illustration at the Johns Hopkins School of Medicine with Max Broedel, "the world-renowned medical illustrator who was credited with bringing 'art to medicine'."

She took to scientific research in ornithology late in life. Through her detailed dissections, she uncovered the olfactory systems in many bird species.

=== Indian folk tales ===
Her husband, Fred Bang, was appointed the director of the Johns Hopkins Centers for Medical Research Training in India and Bangladesh from 1961 to 1976. While there, Betsy Bang became interested in the culture of the Indian subcontinent and learned to read Bengali. She used her knowledge to translate folk tales, which she published in English. She also researched and wrote widely about Sitala, the Hindu goddess for curing poxes, sores, and diseases.

=== Personal life ===
She met Frederik Bang when she was studying medical illustration at Johns Hopkins University in Baltimore, and he was there as a first year medical student. Interviewed at age 90, she recalled their first encounter

"This is Marmaduke", she says, indicating a photograph of a silverbacked mountain gorilla. "Marmaduke introduced me to Frederik. There I was perched on the corpse of this 700-pound, sweet-smelling gorilla in the Johns Hopkins dissection room. In pops this tall, bespectacled, bearded medical student.

'What are you doing?' he asks. 'Why, I'm drawing Marmaduke's musculature. What are you doing?' 'Oh, I just finished an autopsy next door. But why are you making drawings of a gorilla?'

I told him it was for a book on gorilla anatomy, as if it was the most natural thing in the world. I can't quite remember how the romance proceeded after that, but our lives were never the same again."

In 1940, they married, and eventually he was named chairman of the parasitology department at the Johns Hopkins University School of Hygiene. She created illustrations for some of his medical work and they published several papers together. He died in 1981.

The children of Betsy and Fred Bang include Caroline (1941–1996), Axel and Molly, who illustrated her translations of folk tales and is listed as co-author.

Betsy Bang moved to Woods Hole, Massachusetts after her husband's death. The Bangs had a long association with the Marine Biological Laboratory there having first arrived in 1952 to conduct research; they returned for many summers thereafter to work. In Woods Hole, Betsy volunteered and conducted tours at the laboratory and helped computerize its vast catalog of books. She also volunteered at the town's public library until she was 90.

Betsy Bang died at her home in Woods Hole, Massachusetts, on October 31, 2003, at 91 years of age.

== Selected publications ==
Betsy Bang is first author of works that appeared in numerous journals and books.

- Bang, Betsy Garrett. "The nasal organs of the Black and Turkey Vultures; a comparative study of the cathartid species Coragyps atratus atratus and Cathartes aura septentrionalis (with notes on Cathartes aura falklandica, Pseudogyps bengalensis, and Neophron percnopterus)." Journal of Morphology 115 (1964): 153.
- Bang, Betsy G., and Frederik B. Bang. "Laryngotracheitis virus in chickens: a model for study of acute nonfatal desquamating rhinitis." The Journal of experimental medicine 125.3 (1967): 409-428.
- Bang, Betsy G., and F. B. Bang. "Localized lymphoid tissues and plasma cells in paraocular and paranasal organ systems in chickens." The American journal of pathology 53.5 (1968): 735.
- Bang, Betsy G., and Frederik B. Bang. "Replacement of virus-destroyed epithelium by keratinized squamous cells in vitamin A-deprived chickens." Proceedings of the Society for Experimental Biology and Medicine 132.1 (1969): 50-54.
- Bang, Betsy G. "Functional anatomy of the olfactory system in 23 orders of birds." Acta. Anat. 79 (1971): 1-76.
- Bang, Betsy G., Frederik B. Bang, and Marie A. Foard. "Lymphocyte depression induced in chickens on diets deficient in vitamin A and other components." The American journal of pathology 68.1 (1972): 147.
- Bang, Betsy G. Functional Anatomy of the Olfactory System in 23 Orders of Birds: With 27 Figures and 1 Table. München: Karger, 1971. Print.
- Bang, Betsy G., Marie A. Foard, and Frederik B. Bang. "The effect of vitamin A deficiency and Newcastle disease on lymphoid cell systems in chickens." Proceedings of the Society for Experimental Biology and Medicine 143.4 (1973): 1140-1146.
- Bang, Betsy G., et al. "T and B lymphocyte rosetting in undernourished children." Proceedings of the Society for Experimental Biology and Medicine 149.1 (1975): 199-202.
- Bang, Betsy, and Molly Bang. The Old Woman and the Red Pumpkin: A Bengali Folk Tale. New York: Macmillan, 1975. Print.
