= Annebjerggaard =

Manor house in Denmark

- Interactive map of the Annebjerggaard area

General information
- Location: Nykøbing Sjælland, Odsherred, Denmark, Denmark
- Coordinates: 55°54′13.42″N 11°39′53.31″E
- Completed: 1852 (main building), 1787 (former home farm), 1852 (new main building)

Annebjerggaard, also known as Anneberg, is a former manor house situated on the southern outskirts of Nykøbing Sjælland, Odsherred Municipality, some 90 km (56 mi) northwest of Copenhagen, Denmark. It is now operated as a cultural centre. The building is currently home to the administration of Odsherred Museum.

== List of owners ==
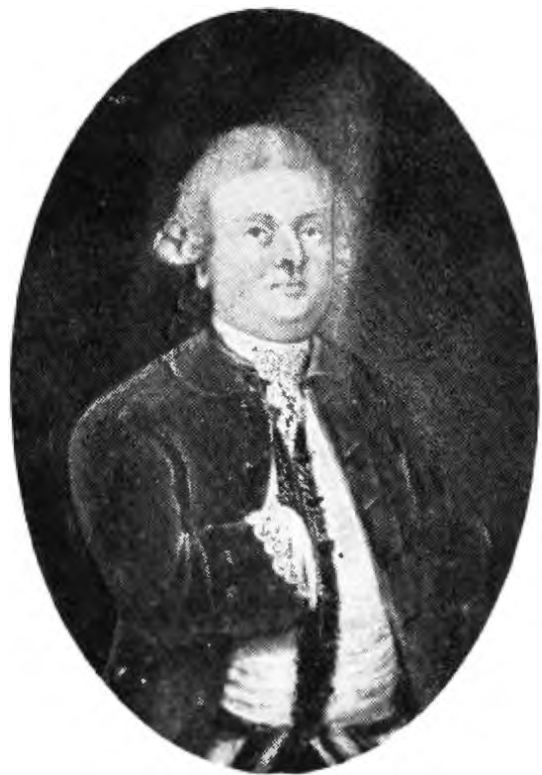
Frantz Wilhelm Trojel

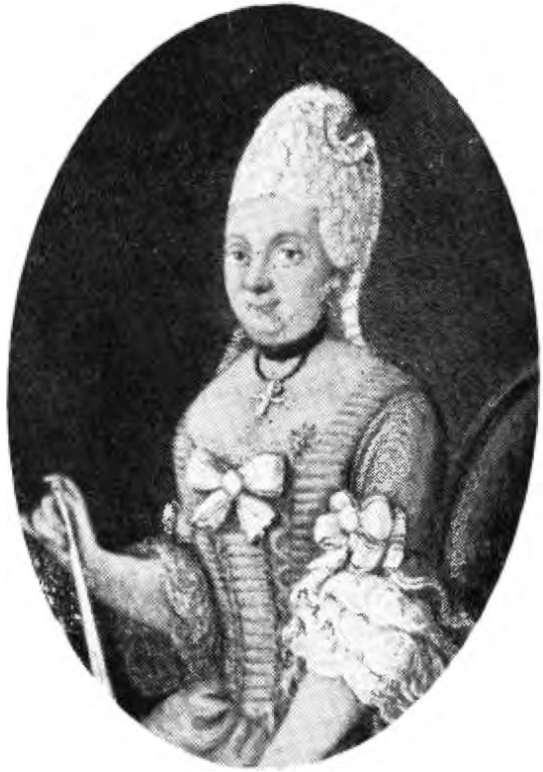
Christine Margrethe Trojel, née Hansen

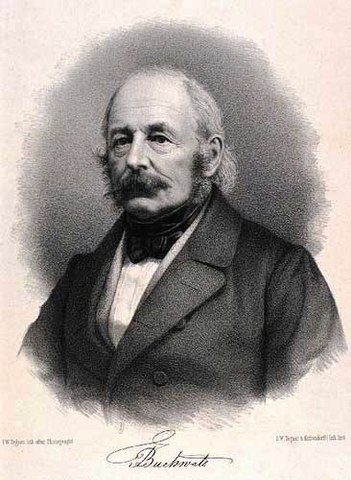
Frederik von Buchwald

- (1660– ) Henrik Müller
- ( –1688) Anna Cathrine Bartholin née Müller
- (1688– ) Manuel Texeira
- ( –1692) Samuel Texeira
- (1692–1697) Gunde Vossbein
- (1697–1705) Hans Leegaard
- (1705–1724) Christian Wildenradt
- (1724– ) Peder Svane
- ( –1760) Niels Christian Bang
- (1760) Ulrikke Eleonore Bang, then Hansen, née Svane
- (1760–1770) Jakob Hansen
- (1770–1776) Henrik Rosted
- (1776–1801) Kronen
- (1801–1810) Frants Wilhelm Trojel
- (1810– ) Lorenz Fribert
- ( –1814) Ulrikke Eleonore Fribert
- (1814–1828) Frederik von Buchwald
- (1828– ) Ulrikke Eleonore Fribert
- ( –1874) Frederik von Buchwald
- (1874–1897) Charlotte Buchwald
- (1897–1913) Christian Frederik Ferdinand von Holstein
- (1913– ) H. H. Rehling-Quistgaard
- ( –1916) T. Abben
- (1916–1932) E. H. Steenberg
- (1932–1947) C. Christfort
- (1947–1970) J. C. Hempel
- (1970–1985) Peter Hempel
- (1985–2000) Hans Tandrup
- (2000–2003) Trundholm Kommune
- (2003– ) Odsherreds Kulturhistoriske Museum
