= Cathrinus Bang =

Norwegian literary historian (1822–1898)

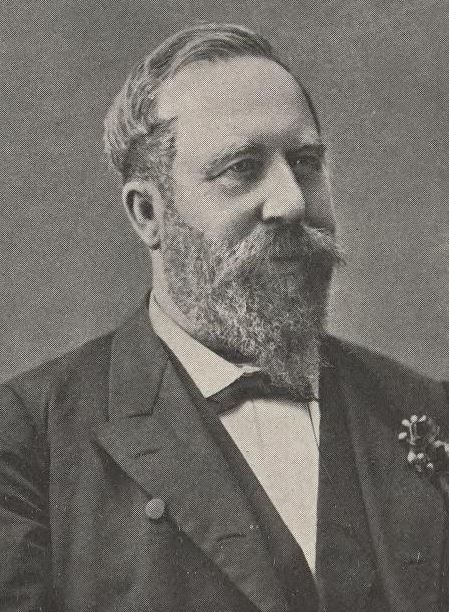
Cathrinus Bang

Cathrinus Dorotheus Olivius Bang (10 June 1822 – 4 June 1898) was a Norwegian literary historian and professor of Scandinavian literature at the University of Christiania (now the University of Oslo).

== Biography ==
Born in Drammen in Buskerud, Norway, Bang was the son of Andreas Bang (1788–1829) and Cathrine Dorothea Schouboe (1795–1822). He attended school at Skien in Telemark and graduated Cand.theol. with honors in 1852 from the Royal Frederick University. From 1857 to 1862 he was a teacher at the Nissen Latin and Secondary School (Nissens Latin- og Realskole) in Kristiania (now Oslo).

He was appointed professor of Scandinavian literature at the University of Christiania from 1869. Bang was the first holder of this chair which he continued to hold until just before his death in 1898. He was succeeded by the biographer and literary historian, Gerhard Gran, who had been his former student. He remained unmarried but was the adoptive father of Dagny Bang who was among the first female physicians in Norway.
