= Hans Bang =

Norwegian judge

- Born: 11 August 1863; Risør, Norway
- Died: 21 April 1945 (aged 81)
- Occupation: Judge

Hans Bang (11 August 1863 – 21 April 1945) was a Norwegian judge.

He was born in Risør to merchant Hans Bang and Adama Schanche. He graduated as cand.jur. in 1886, and was named as a Supreme Court Justice from 1919. He participated in several governmental commissions, particularly on tax issues, and chaired Trustkontrollrådet from 1926.
