= Bang Won-sun =

South Korean basketball player (1917–1986)

Personal information
- Nationality: South Korean
- Born: 1917
- Died: 28 August 1986 (aged 68–69)

Sport
- Sport: Basketball

Bang Won-sun (1917 – 28 August 1986) was a South Korean basketball player. He competed in the men's tournament at the 1948 Summer Olympics. He died on 28 August 1986, in his 69th year.
