= Dagny Bang =

Norwegian physician and Liberal Party politician (1868–1944)

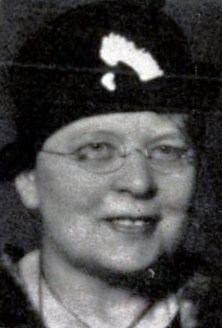
Dagny Bang.

Dagny Kristine Bang (8 June 1868 – 11 August 1944) was a Norwegian physician and politician for the Liberal Party. She was among the first physicians in Norway, and was also a proponent for women's rights.

She was born in Christiania as a daughter of shipmaster Kristian Andersen og Karoline Larsen, but was adopted together with her sister by professor Cathrinus Bang (1822–1898). In July 1901 she married teacher Ivar Andreas Refsdal (1872–1937), a son of politician Anfin Larsen Refsdal.

She took her examen artium at Ragna Nielsen School in 1888, enrolled in medicine studies at the Royal Frederick University and graduated with the cand.med. degree in 1896. Bang was the sixth woman to graduate in medicine in Norway. She was a medical candidate at Rikshospitalet before starting a private clinic in 1897. She was also physician at Vaterland Primary School from 1899 to 1933. She continued her studies, in gynecology and dermatology with several study trips abroad, and was a certified specialist in the latter subject from 1912.

Bang was a board member of the National Association for Women's Suffrage from 1898 to 1902 and the Norwegian Association for Women's Rights from 1908 to 1910. After the 1907 Norwegian local elections she served two terms as a deputy member of Kristiania city council. She was a co-founder and board member of the Kristiania Liberal Party Women's League. Together with Louise Isachsen and Kristine Munch, among others, she was a co-founder of the Medical Women's Association in 1921, an organization she later chaired for four years. In 1935, she founded the Norwegian branch of Open Door International.

Bang was eventually struck with cancer. She underwent treatment, among others, at the Karolinska Hospital in Solna, where she died in August 1944.
