= Bang Seong-joon =

Korean actor

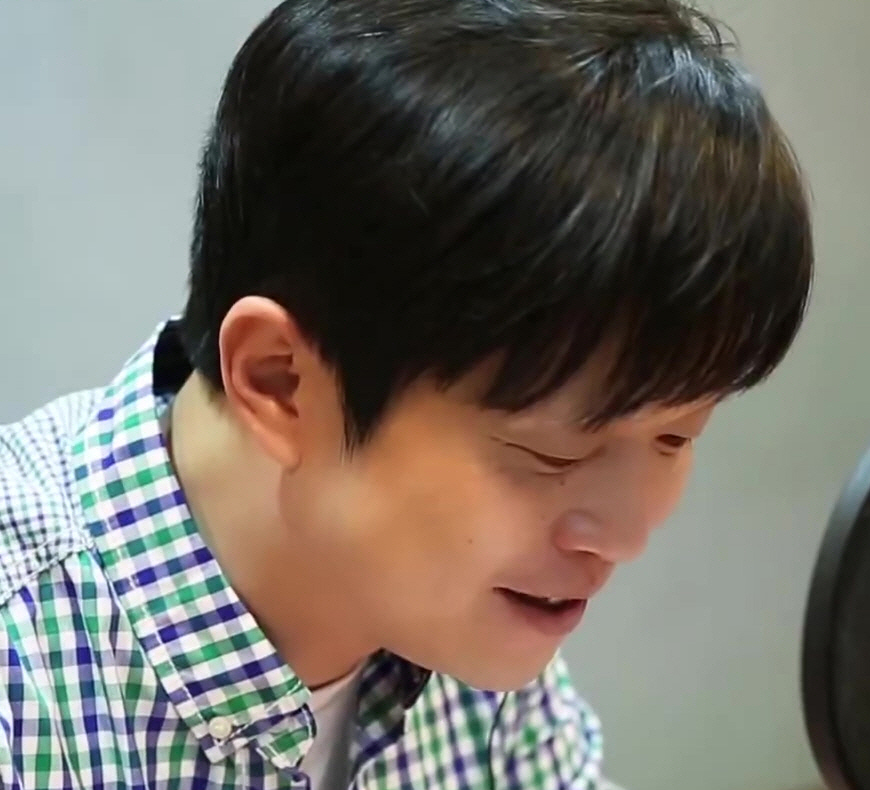
- Bang in 2013
- Occupation: Voice actor
- Years active: 2000–present

Bang Seong-joon (Korean: 방성준) is a South Korean voice actor who joined the Munhwa Broadcasting Corporation's Voice Acting Division in 2002.

== Roles ==
=== Broadcast TV ===
- Futari wa Pretty Cure (Korea TV Edition, SBS)
- Ojamajo Doremi (Korea TV Edition, MBC)
- Hoshin Engi (Korea TV Edition, Tooniverse)
- Doraemon (Korea TV Edition, MBC)
- Rodosdo (Korea TV Edition, Tooniverse)
- Jimmy Neutron (Korea TV Edition, MBC)
- The Amazing World of Gumball (Korea TV edition, Cartoon Network) - Richard Watterson
- The Amazing Adrenalini Brothers (Korea TV Edition, Cartoon Network)
- Hwang Bi Hong (Korea TV Edition, MBC)

== See also ==
- Munhwa Broadcasting Corporation
- MBC Voice Acting Division

== Homepage ==
- MBC Voice Acting Division Bang Seong-joon Blog (in Korean)
- AD Sound Bang Seong-joon Blog (in Korean)
