= Molly Bang =

American illustrator

Molly G. Bang
- Born: December 29, 1943 (age 82); Princeton, New Jersey
- Education: Wellesley College; University of Arizona; Harvard University
- Known for: Children's Book Illustrations
- Notable work: When Sophie Gets Angry -- Really, Really Angry...

Molly Garrett Bang (born December 29, 1943) is an American illustrator. For her illustration of children's books she has been a runner-up for the American Caldecott Medal three times and for the British Greenaway Medal once. Announced June 2015, her 1996 picture book Goose is the 2016 Phoenix Picture Book Award winner – that is, named by the Children's Literature Association the best English-language children's picture book that did not win a major award when it was published twenty years earlier.

== Biography ==
Bang was born in Princeton, New Jersey to illustrator Betsy Bang and medical researcher Fred Bang. Her education includes attendance at Wellesley College, reception of a Master of Arts degree from the University of Arizona (1969) and Harvard University (1970).

Bang began writing children's books after a failed stint as a reporter for The Baltimore Sun. At first illustrating folk tales, she turned eventually to her own stories. The ability to carry emotion in pictures is of particular interest to her; her one book for adults, Picture This (1991) is specifically about the practical ways pictures work. Her wordless picture book The Grey Lady and the Strawberry Snatcher is notable for its use of negative space and the way Bang contrasts bright colors against grey.

In the 2000s, Bang and her daughter Monika Bang-Campbell collaborated as illustrator and writer to create three picture books featuring Little Rat, a girl rat who learns with courage or practice to sail, to ride a horse, and to play the violin.

Bang lives in California, previously she resided in Massachusetts.

== Books ==
=== As writer or editor and illustrator ===
- The Goblins Giggle, And Other Stories (1973)
- Men From The Village Deep In The Mountains and Other Japanese Folk Tales (1973)
- Wiley And The Hairy Man: Adapted From An American Folktale (1976)
- The Buried Moon And Other Stories (1977)
- The Grey Lady and the Strawberry Snatcher (1980)
- Tye May And The Magic Brush (1981)
- Yellow Ball (1991)
- Ten, Nine, Eight (1983), a counting book
- Dawn (1983, reissued 2002)
- The Paper Crane (1985)
- Delphine (1988)
- Picture This: Perception & Composition, foreword By Rudolf Arnheim (1991); revised as Picture This: How Pictures Work (2000)
- One Fall Day (1994)
- Chattanooga Sludge (1996)
- Goose (1996)
- Common Ground: The Water, Earth, And Air We Share (1997)
- When Sophie Gets Angry—Really, Really Angry ... (1999)
- Nobody Particular: One Woman's Fight To Save The Bays (2000)
- Tiger's Fall (2001)
- My Light (2004)
- In My Heart (2005)
- Living Sunlight: How Plants Bring The Earth To Life (2009), by Molly Bang and Penny Chisholm
- All of Me! A Book of Thanks (2009)
- When Sophie’s Feelings Are Really Really Hurt (2015)
- When Sophie Thinks She Can’t (2018)

=== As illustrator only ===
- The Old Woman And The Red Pumpkin; a Bengali Folk Tale, translated and adapted by Betsy Bang (1975)
- The Old Woman And The Rice Thief, adapted from a Bengali folktale by Betsy Bang (1978)
- Tuntuni, The Tailor Bird, adapted from a Bengali Folktale by Betsy Bang (1978)
- The Demons Of Rajpur: Five Tales From Bengal, translated and adapted by Betsy Bang (1980)
- David's Landing, by Judith Benét Richardson (1984)
- Red Dragonfly On My Shoulder: Haiku, translated by Sylvia Cassedy and Kunihiro Suetake (1992)
- From Sea To Shining Sea: A Treasury Of American Folklore and Folk Songs, compiled by Amy L. Cohn; illustrated by eleven Caldecott Medal and four Caldecott Honor Book artists (1993)
- Little Rat Sets Sail, by Monika Bang-Campbell (Harcourt, 2002) – first of three "easy-reader collaborations" by mother and daughter
- Little Rat Rides, by Monika Bang-Campbell 2004)
- Little Rat Makes Music, by Monika Bang-Campbell (2004)
- Old Mother Bear, by Victoria Miles (2007)
- Harley, by Star Livingstone

== Awards and honors ==
- The Grey Lady and the Strawberry Snatcher (1980) — Caldecott Medal Honor Book, Aesop Award, Agatha Award Finalist, ALA Notable Children's Books, Arkansas Diamond Primary Book Award, Bay Area Book Reviewers Association Award, Booklist Editors' Choice, Boston Globe–Horn Book Award
- Ten, Nine, Eight (1983) — U.S. Caldecott Honor Book; U.K. Greenaway Medal commended runner-up
- The Paper Crane. (1987) Boston Globe-Horn Book Award, illustration award, International Board on Books for Young People
- Goose. (1996) School Library Journal Best Book, 2016 Phoenix Picture Book Award
- Common Ground: The Water, Earth, and Air We Share. (1998) Giverny Book Award
- When Sophie Gets Angry – Really, Really Angry. (1999) Caldecott Honor Book, Jane Addams Children's Book Awards Honor Award, Arbuthnot Award, Charlotte Zolotow Award
- My Light. ALA Notable book. Massachusetts Book Award
- When Sophie Thinks She Can’t, 2021 Mathical Honors
