= Bang Jin-hyeok =

South Korean hockey player

Personal information
- Nationality: South Korean
- Born: 5 June 1975 (age 50)

Sport
- Sport: Field hockey

Bang Jin-hyeok (born 5 June 1975) is a South Korean field hockey player. She competed in the women's tournament at the 2000 Summer Olympics.
