= Peter Fibiger Bang =

Danish comparative historian (born 1973)

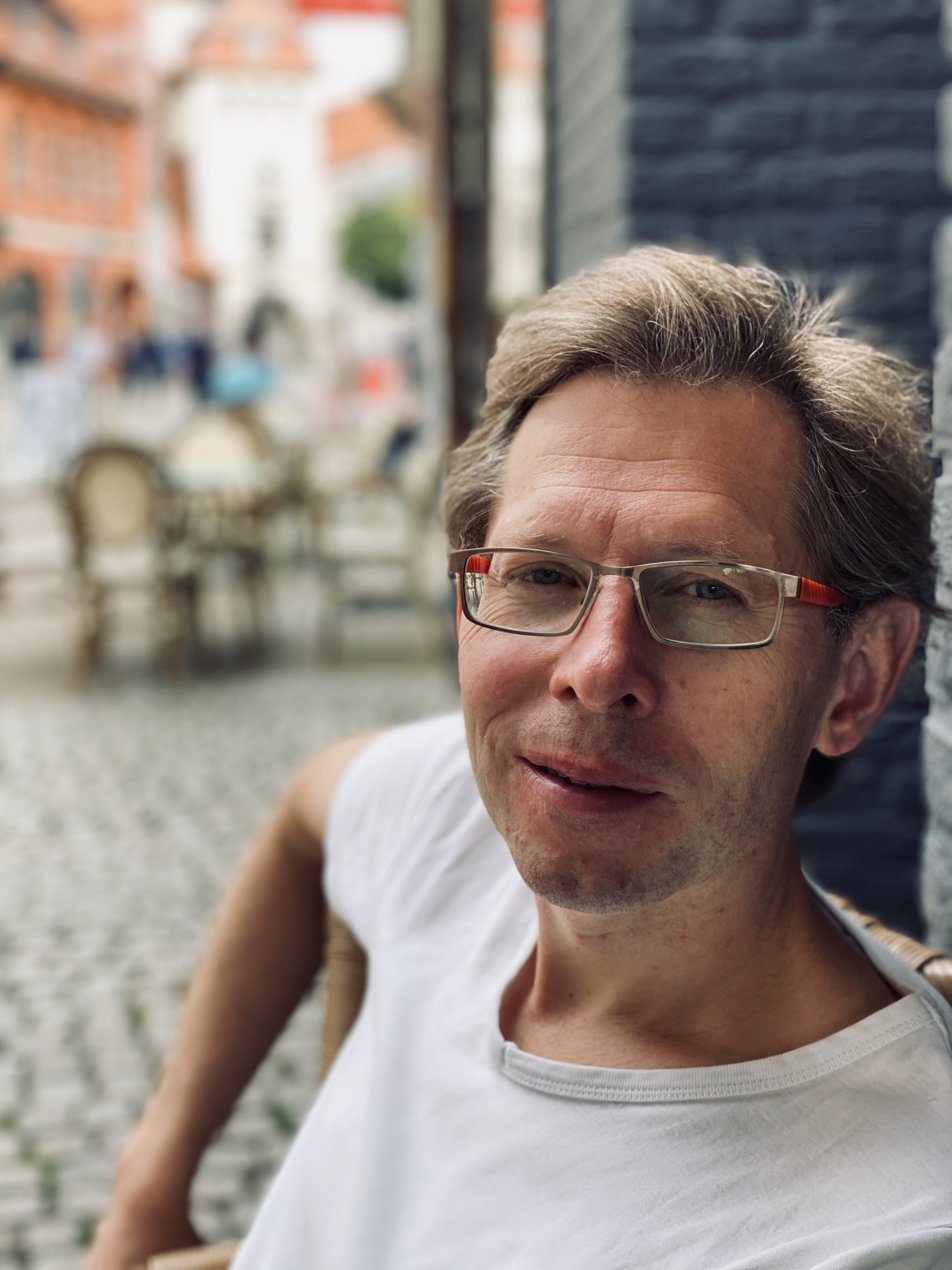
- Born: 25 June 1973; Horsens, Denmark
- Education: University of Aarhus; Corpus Christi College, Cambridge
- Scientific career
- Fields: Historian
- Workplaces: University of Copenhagen

Peter Fibiger Bang (born 25 June 1973) is a Danish historian of Rome, empire, cross-cultural comparison and world history. Bang's main research interests are Roman economic history, Roman imperial power and historical sociology – as well as the reception of Classical culture in later ages.

== Life and career ==
Born in Horsens, Denmark, in 1973, Bang studied History, Latin and Greek at the University of Aarhus from 1992 to 1999. In 1997, he was a visitor at the University of Leicester, where he studied Roman Archaeology. In 1999, he moved to Corpus Christi College, University of Cambridge, to work on his PhD in the Faculty of Classics, supervised by professor Peter Garnsey and professor Keith Hopkins. During the autumn of 2001, he was a visitor, with professor Richard Saller, at the University of Chicago.

Since 2002 Bang has been employed, currently as the professor of Roman history, in the department of history (The Saxo Institute) at the University of Copenhagen.

In 2005 he initiated, in co-operation with professor C. A. Bayly, and was elected chair of a European-based research network, Tributary Empires Compared, to stimulate historical comparison between the Roman, Mughal and Ottoman Empires. This network was funded by COST till 2009.

During his employment in Copenhagen, Bang has been a visiting professor, fellow or academic affiliate at a range of institutions and for varying periods of time: at the University of Tübingen in 2004, at King's College, University of Cambridge in 2007, at the University of Heidelberg in 2011, at the Department of Classics, Stanford University in 2014, at the Institute for Advanced Studies in the Humanities and Social Sciences, Zhejiang University in 2017, at the RomanIslam Centre, University of Hamburg in 2020, at the Centre for Migration and Mobility in Late Antiquity and the Early Middle Age, University of Tübingen in 2022 and at the University of Freiburg in 2023.

Bang has authored, edited or co-edited fifteen volumes as of autumn 2025, as well as written a substantial number of articles, chapter contributions, reviews and essays. In addition to his academic activities, Bang writes on an occasional basis for the Danish newspaper, Weekendavisen.

== Selected works ==
- The Roman Bazaar. A Comparative Study of Trade and Markets in a Tributary Empire, Cambridge University Press, 2008, ISBN 978-0-521-85532-7
- Tributary Empires in Global History, Palgrave, 2011, ISBN 978-0-230-29472-1 (co-editor)
- Universal Empire. A Comparative Approach to Imperial Culture and Representation in Eurasian History, Cambridge University Press, 2012, ISBN 978-1-107-02267-6 (co-editor)
- The Oxford Handbook of the State in the Ancient Near East and Mediterranean, Oxford University Press, 2013, ISBN 978-0-19-518831-8 (co-editor)
- Irregulare Aliquod Corpus? Comparison, World History and the Historical Sociology of the Roman Empire, Copenhagen 2014, ISBN 978-87-997650-0-3
- The Oxford World History of Empire, 2 Vols. Oxford University Press 2021, ISBN 9780197533970 (co-editor)
- The Roman Empire and World History, Cambridge University Press, 2025, ISBN 978-1-316-51610-2
