= Per Bang =

Norwegian journalist

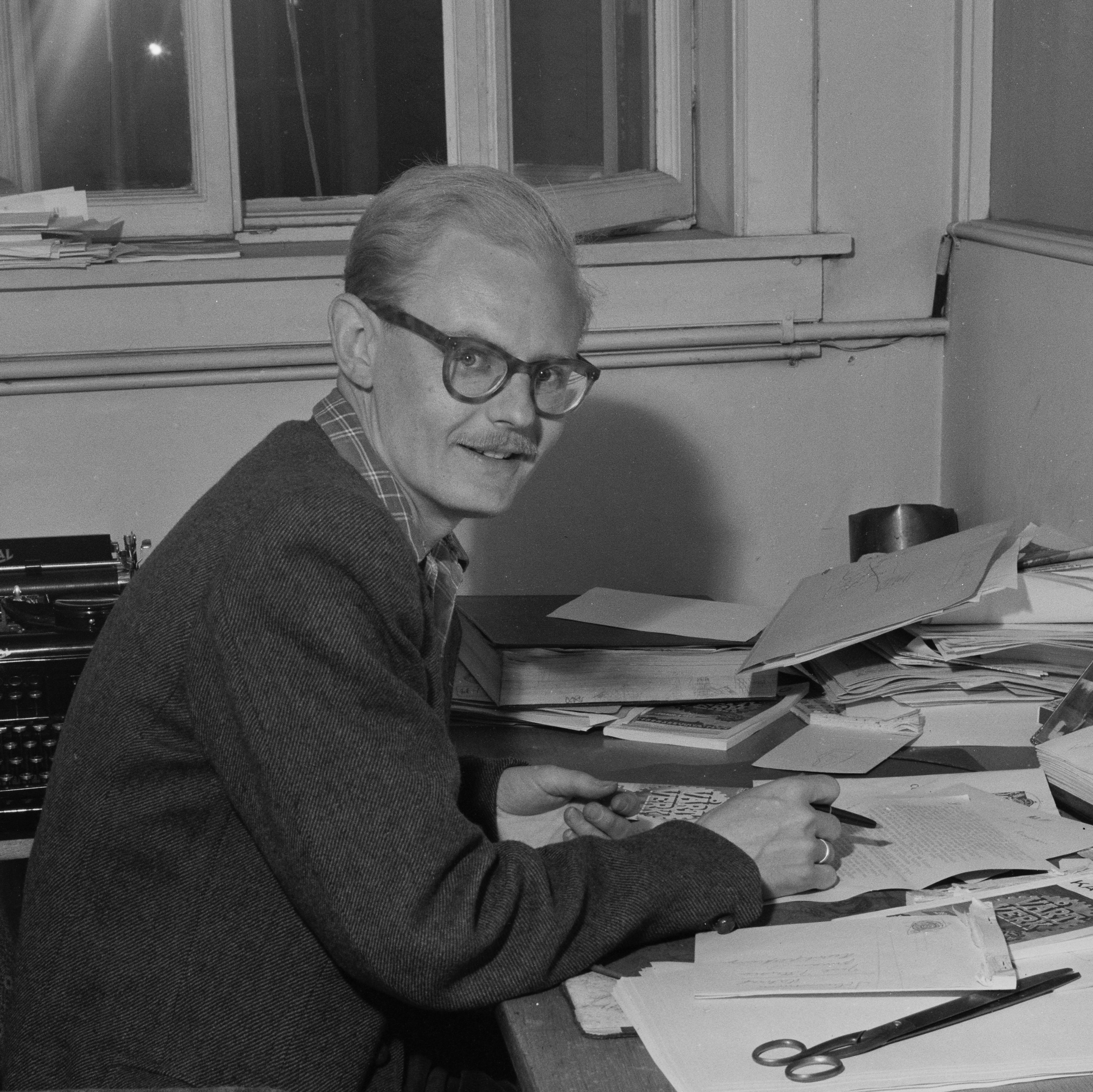
Per Bang

Per Bang (29 November 1922 – 24 April 2010) was a Norwegian journalist. He worked in Dagens Næringsliv from 1946 to 2006, and became known for his column På nattbordet.

== Career ==
He was born in Oslo, and was a bookseller's apprentice when World War II broke out. In 1943 he was taken as a "hostage" by the Nazi German occupants of Norway, imprisoned at Bredtveit concentration camp from 27 February to 5 April and then at Grini concentration camp to 20 December 1943.

After the war he considered finishing secondary education, but instead worked in the newspaper Jarlsberg from 1945 to 1947. In 1946 he was hired in Norges Handels og Sjøfartstidende, later named Dagens Næringsliv, where he worked until 2006, from 1956 to 1974 as London correspondent. He was formally a freelancer since 1989, and when retiring he was one of Norway's oldest active journalists. He became known for his column På nattbordet, though unsigned, where he enquired businesspeople and others on what books they were reading. On occasions, the result would be subtly embarrassing for the interview object. He also worked with the catalogue for the art exhibition Norske Bilder.

He issued several books, both fiction and non-fiction. His debut was the short story collection Dommedag for deg (1952), and he also released the novel Stedfortredere (1981). His non-fiction books were mostly from his period as London correspondent, including Den Norske Klub i London 75 år (1962), Er de gale? (1967) and Londonguide (with Anne-Marie Bang, 1970). He was a member of the Norwegian Authors' Union for some years, but backed out because he was more comfortable with the title "journalist". He received the Golden Pen award from the Riksmål Society in 1990.

Bang was active in Amnesty International and Nei til atomvåpen. He was a Roman Catholic, and was married twice. He died in April 2010.
