= Bang Hyeon-seok =

South Korean writer

- Born: October 3, 1961 (age 64); Ulsan
- Writing career
- Language: ko

- Bang Hyeon-seok
- Hangul: 방현석
- RR: Bang Hyeonseok
- MR: Pang Hyŏnsŏk

Bang Hyeon-seok (Korean: 방현석) is a South Korean writer.

== Life ==
Bang was born in 1961 in Ulsan, South Korea, and has served as the president of Society of Young Writers For Understanding Vietnam, and he continues to devote much of his creative energy to exploring Vietnam's troubled past. His debut was in 1988 with "The Practice." Bang enrolled in the Chung-Ang University's Department of Creative writing in 1980 and later, under an assumed identity, worked as a laborer in Incheon. After leaving the factory in 1994 Bang collected history and information on democratic labor unions, a collection that informed some of his work including Off to Battle a Dawn. Bang has worked as a creative writing professor at Chung-Ang University, on the editorial board of Silcheonmunhak, and as the editor-in-chief of Asia: Magazine of Asian Literature.

== Work ==
Bang's first work was The First Step Forward which focused on factory laborers and their struggle to save union. Since that debut, Bang has continued to write "labor fiction." Having worked as a laborer and a factory worker during the 1980s and 1990s, Bang writes about the hardships of the laborers in a post-capitalist society with sympathy and insight that he acquired firsthand. "No matter what, literature is life and nothing else," Bang has declared, "and the fulcrum of my life will continue to be literature. I vow to continue to write about the world I dream of, in the manner and style I choose." After the mid-1990s, Bang published several works that depict the dark period of military dictatorship. For Ten Years focuses on the yushin dictatorship under Park Chung Hee and Your Left Side is a portrait of the dictatorship under Chun Doo Hwan who came into power through the violent suppression of May 18th Democratic Uprising in Gwangju. Bang, however, is not only a historical author. His A Form of Existence is an attempt to find "a solution through literature" to the problematic relationship between Vietnam and Korea, engendered by Korea's participation in Vietnam War, and illuminates not just the past, but the present as well as the future of the two countries' relationship.

== Awards ==
- Oh Yeong-su Literary Award (2003)
- Third annual Hwang Sun-won Literary Award

== Works in translation ==
- Off To Battle at Dawn (2013)
- Time to Eat Lobster (2016)

== Works in Korean (partial) ==
Short Story Collections

- The House That Opens Tomorrow (Naeil-eul Yeoneun Jip, 1991)
- Time to Eat Lobster (Lobster-reul Meoknun Sigan, 2003)

Novels

- For Ten Years (Sip-nyeon-gan, 1995)
- Your Left Side (Dangsin-ui Oenpyeon, 2000)

Essay Collections

- Beautiful Resistance (Aremdaun Jeohang, 1999)
- A Star Rises in Hanoi (Hanoi-e Byeol-i Teuda, 2002)
