= Fred Bang =

Medical researcher

- Fred and Betsy Bang at a Comparative Pathology of Marine Invertebrates course at the Marine Biological Laboratory in 1980
- Born: Frederik "Fred" Barry Bang; 1916
- Died: 1981 (aged 64–65); New York City
- Occupation: Medical researcher
- Known for: Limulus Amebocyte Lysate test for bacteria
- Spouse: Betsy Bang
- Children: Caroline, Axel, and Molly Bang

Frederik Barry Bang (1916–1981) was an American medical researcher who developed the Limulus amebocyte lysate (LAL) test for bacterial endotoxins. He was influential in applying marine biology to medical research, especially immunology.

== Biography ==
Frederik Bang attended Johns Hopkins University earning an A.B. in 1935 and went on at the university's School of Medicine receiving his MD in 1939.

Bang continued at the university as a researcher with his first faculty post as assistant professor of medicine in 1946. In 1953, he was named chairman of the department of parasitology at the School of Hygiene. He was director of the university's Centers for Medical Research Training in India and Bangladesh from 1961 to 1976.

Along with a colleague, Jack Levin, Bang is remembered for his development of the Limulus amebocyte lysate (LAL). The LAL test could be used to find bacterial endotoxins using horseshoe crab blood, which is blue. Based upon their observations, they found that horseshoe crab blood clots in the presence of gram-negative bacteria that cause pneumonia and meningitis, thus providing a testing medium.

The LAL test can return a result in as little as 45 minutes and can detect the presence of endotoxins at levels of less than one part per trillion, and it is used in pharmaceuticals and medical devices that come in contact with blood. Bang was a leader in the use of marine models in medical research, especially immunology.

In 1977 the U.S. Food and Drug Administration (FDA) approved the LAL test for drugs, products and devices that come in contact with the blood.

=== Personal life ===
His wife was the biologist and illustrator Betsy Bang. They had three children: Caroline (1941–1996), Axel and the illustrator Molly Bang.

While serving in the United States Army Medical Corps, he directed research studies on malaria and other tropical diseases in Australia, New Guinea, the Philippines and Japan.

Bang died in 1981 in New York City of a heart attack while traveling to Sweden and West Germany to present scientific papers.

=== Honors ===
Bang was named a National Research Council fellow in pathology at Vanderbilt University School of Medicine.

Bang and Lewis were awarded a Golden Goose Award for their work on the LAL test in 2019.

== Selected publications ==
- Bang, Frederick B., and William C. Reeves. "Mosquitoes and Encephalitis in the Yakima Valley, Washington. III. Feeding Habits of Culex tarsalis Coq., a Mosquito Host of the Viruses of Western Equine and St. Louis Encephalitis." Journal of Infectious Diseases 70 (1942).
- Bang, Frederick B., and J. L. Frost. "The toxic effect of a marine bacterium on Limulus and the formation of blood clots." Biological Bulletin. Vol. 105. No. 2. 7 MBL ST, WOODS HOLE, MA 02543: Marine Biological Laboratory, 1953.
- Bang, Betsy G., and Frederik B. Bang. "Laryngotracheitis virus in chickens: a model for study of acute nonfatal desquamating rhinitis." Journal of Experimental Medicine 125.3 (1967): 409-428.
- Bang, Betsy G., and F. B. Bang. "Localized lymphoid tissues and plasma cells in paraocular and paranasal organ systems in chickens." The American Journal of Pathology 53.5 (1968): 735.
- Bang, Betsy G., and Frederik B. Bang. "Replacement of virus-destroyed epithelium by keratinized squamous cells in vitamin A-deprived chickens." Proceedings of the Society for Experimental Biology and Medicine 132.1 (1969) Society for Experimental Biology and Medicine 50-54.
- Bang, Betsy G., Frederik B. Bang, and Marie A. Foard. "Lymphocyte depression induced in chickens on diets deficient in vitamin A and other components." The American Journal of Pathology 68.1 (1972): 147.
- Bang, Betsy G., Marie A. Foard, and Frederik B. Bang. "The effNat Gertlerect of vitamin A deficiency and Newcastle disease on lymphoid cell systems in chickens." Proceedings of the Society for Experimental Biology and Medicine 143.4 (1973): 1140-1146.
- Schultz, Warren W., and Frederick B. Bang. "Virus-induced lysosomal enzyme dissolution of nasal turbinate cartilage." The American Journal of Pathology 87.3 (1977): 667.
- Bang, Frederick B. "History of tissue culture at Johns Hopkins." Bulletin of the History of Medicine 51.4 (1977): 516-537.
