= Nykøbing Sjælland =

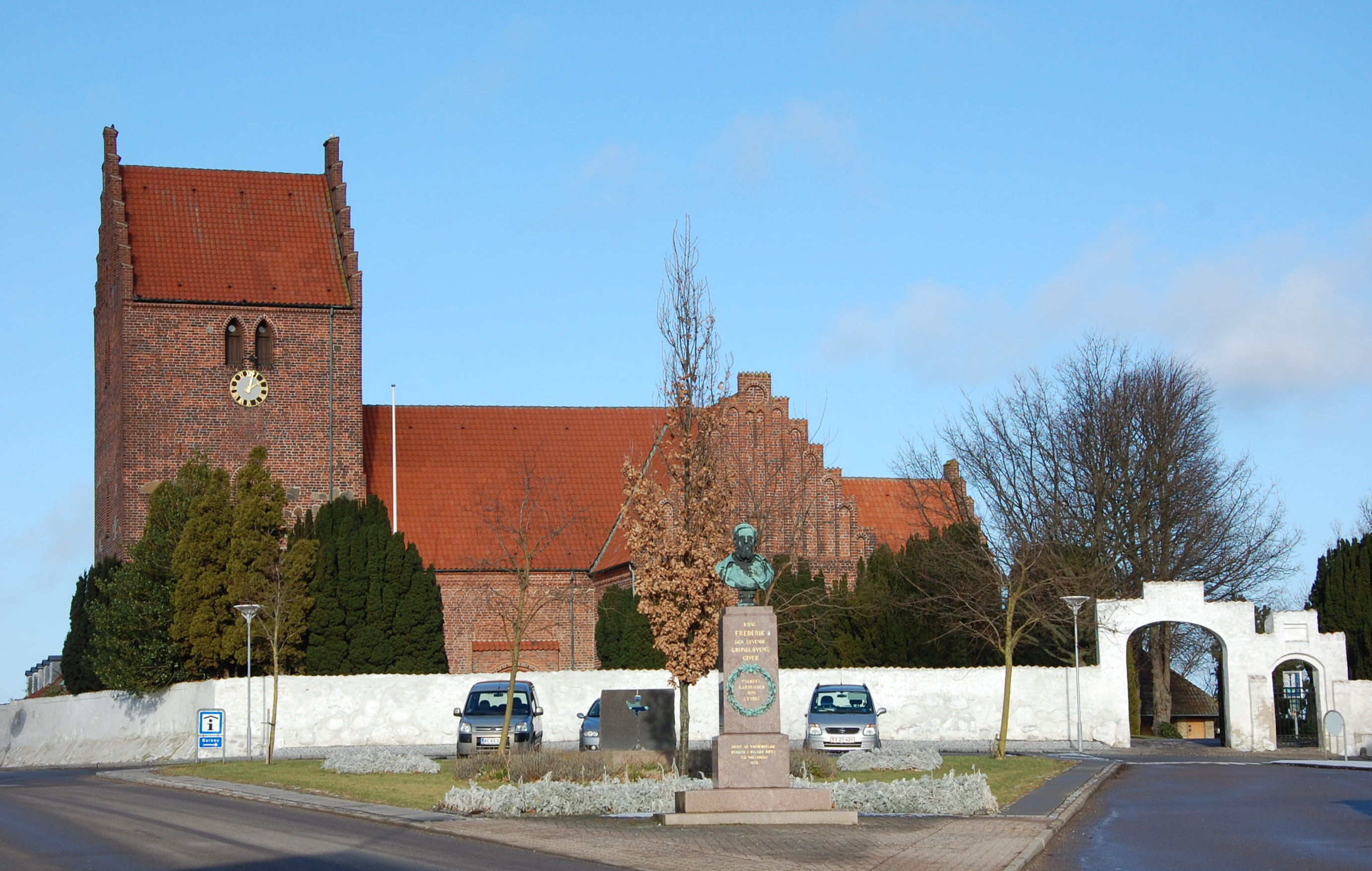
- Nykøbing Church

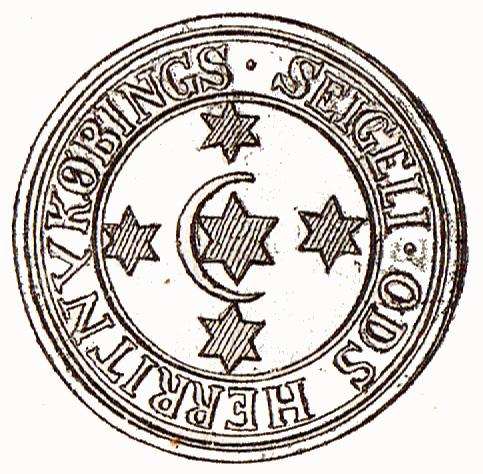
- Seal Coat of arms
- Nickname: Odsherreds købstad
- Location in Denmark Nykøbing Sjælland (Denmark Region Zealand)
- Coordinates: 55°55′30″N 11°40′0″E
- Country: Denmark
- Region: Zealand
- Municipality: Odsherred
- Established: 13th century

Area
  - Urban: 3.1 km^{2} (1.2 sq mi)

Population (1 January 2026)
  - Urban: 5,034
  - Urban density: 1,600/km^{2} (4,200/sq mi)
  - Gender: 2,373 males and 2,661 females
- Time zone: UTC+1 (CET)
  - Summer (DST): UTC+2 (CEST)
- Postal Code: 4500 Nykøbing Sj.

Nykøbing, often referred to as Nykøbing Sjælland or Nykøbing Sj to distinguish it from Nykøbing F and Nykøbing M, is a seaside town in Denmark, located in Odsherred on the northwestern part of Zealand. Located on the Isefjord, it has a population of 5,034 (1 January 2026). It is located in Odsherred municipality which is part of Region Sjælland. The town is a popular seaside resort.

== History ==
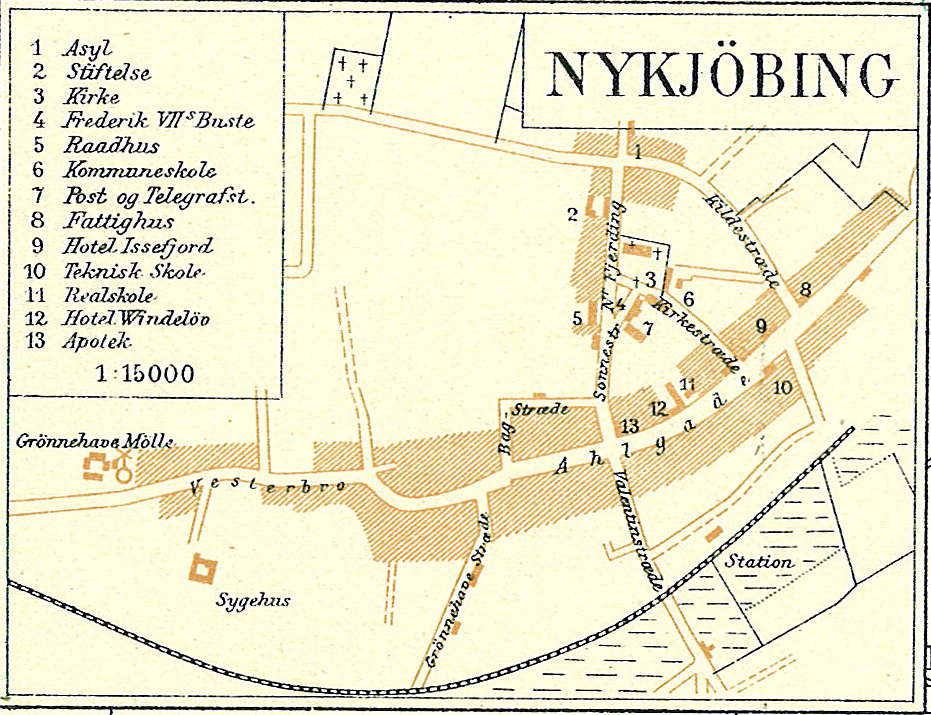
Historic map of Nykøbing Sjælland, c. 1900.

Nykøbing Sjælland is one of the oldest market towns in Zealand, first mentioned in the last part of the 13th century, although the local church dates from the first half of the 13th century. The town was destroyed by followers of Marsk Stig in 1290, and it has since been swept by several fires. The town and surrounding land was pawned by the crown to the Diocese of Roskilde in 1370 but was redeemed by Queen Margaret I. In the Middle Ages, the town was known for its harbour and its role in herring fishing. It received a charter in 1443, after which commerce replaced fishing as the main occupation. A school teaching in Latin was established in 1590, and replaced by a school which taught in Danish by 1740. At this time, the population was a mere 350, making it one of Zealand's smallest towns.

The local courthouse was erected in 1868 on Holtets Plads near the church. This building also served as a city hall and prison. It has been a protected structure since 1991 and is now the home of Restaurant Madkunsten.

In 1915 the Hospital for the Insane (in Danish "Sindsygehospitalet") was opened in Nykøbing Sjælland. After changing the name several times, the final name, The Psychiatric Hospital in Nykøbing Sjælland, was given in 2000. In addition being a general Psychiatric hospital it also contains Denmark's first (founded 4 November 1915) and to date only closed psychiatric ward (Sikringen) for the criminally insane and particular dangerous psychotic patients. Psychiatric Hospital had its own Chapel and cemetery, both now part of the Nykøbing Sj. Psychiatric Museum, known as "The Brainless Cemetery".

=== The Brainless Cemetery ===
The name "The Brainless Cemetery" (i.e., de hjerneløses kirkegård) was not a name out of disrespect for the patients buried there. Between 1945 and 1982 an estimate of up to 2,000 brains were removed from patients prior to being buried in the cemetery. After the removal, the brains were sent to Psychiatric Hospital in Risskov (Aarhus, Denmark) to be used in research. The removal was done in the hospital's Chapel that also contains a room used for dissections. The removal of the brains was carried out by the nursing staff which besides their normal nursing care of psychiatric ill patients had had this additional task. During the period that the removals were carried out, relatives to the patients were not asked for permission either were they informed. Most if not all of the patients buried at the cemetery have been buried without their brains.

== Culture ==
=== Museums ===
The local Odsherred Museum was located in Kirkestræde till 2004, but has since been relocated to modern buildings near "Hempels Glas Museum" (formerly Annebjerggaard Museum), around 2 km (1.2 mi) south of town. The latter museum holds Northern Europe's largest privately-owned collection of antique glass.

A third local museum was dedicated to detective fiction and Sherlock Holmes. This is now closed.

The Nykøbing Sj. Psychiatric Museum was established in 1988. It showcases the history of psychiatry throughout the past 100 years.

=== Other cultural facilities ===
==== Odsherred Theatre ====
Odsherred Theatre was originally located in Annebergparken, a little way out of the town centre. This theatre formerly included the Odsherred Teaterskole, which in 2015 was amalgamated with five other performing arts schools to form the Danish National School of Performing Arts; however, there is no campus of the new institution in the town.

In summer 2016 the theatre was moved to an end-of-life shopping premises at Algade 36, which had been purchased by Odsherred Municipality. First, the front part of the building was renovated, creating a small stage as well as a café, office, and kitchen. A building fund was established, with funding from the A. P. Møller and Chastine Mc-Kinney Møller Foundation, Realdania, Aage and Johanne Louis-Hansens Foundation. An extension was built built in the form of a new and flexible so-called "blackbox theatre". It is now located in a new building, designed by Christensen & Co Architects and Primus Arkitekter, which opened in September 2021. The new theatre extension seats 230 people in its 300 m^{2} (3,200 sq ft) of space.

==== Pakhuset ====
The town has a section of the regional library, Odsherreds Bibliotek. It is located in the "Pakhuset" building, which is also the venue for concerts, art exhibitions, and the like.

== Sport ==
The town has a soccer team, "Nykøbing IF", and a stadium accommodating 3,500 people.

== Infrastructure ==
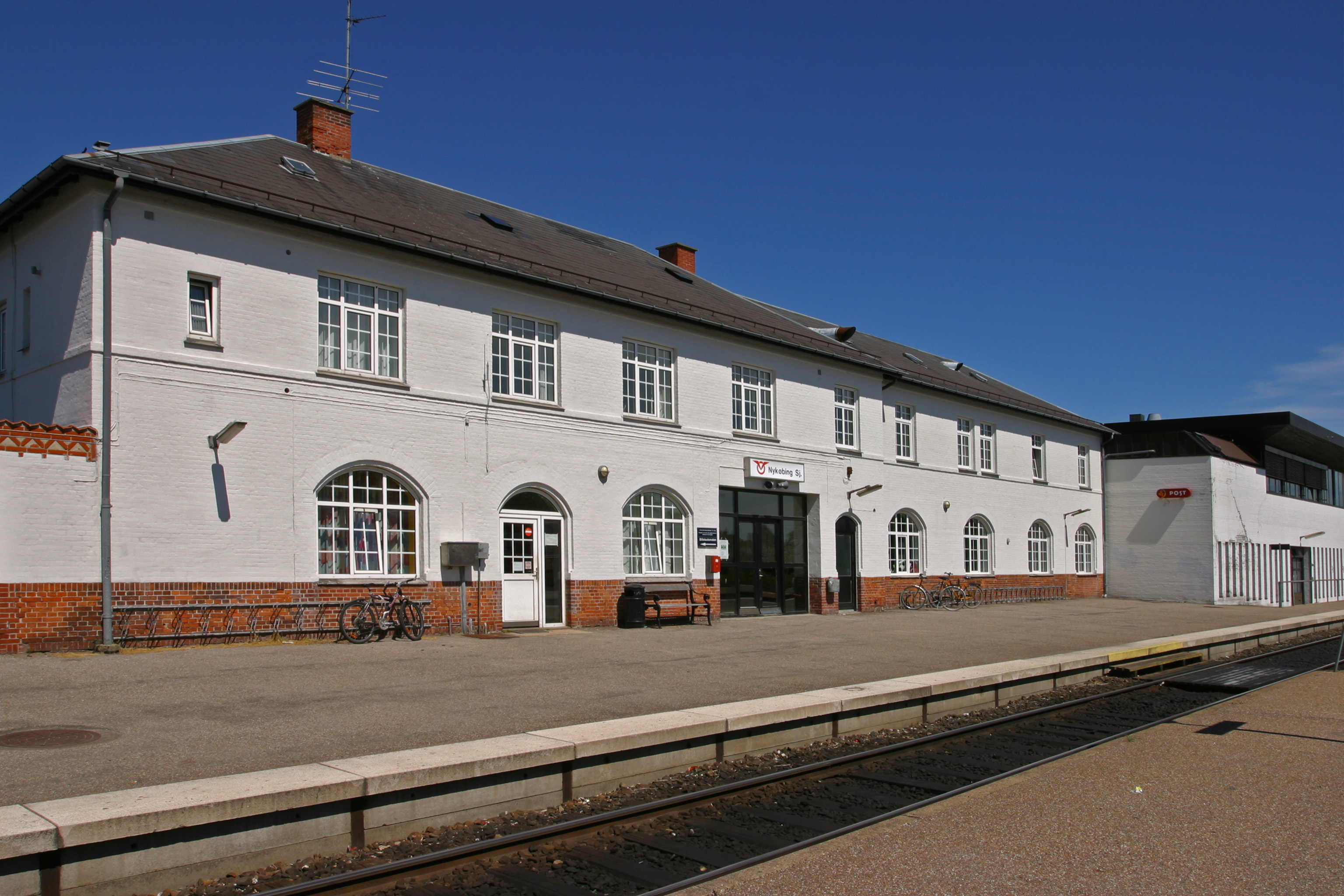
Nykøbing Sjælland railway station.

Nykøbing Sjælland is connected with Holbæk and the Danish rail network by the Odsherred Line operated by the railway company Lokaltog. Nykøbing Sjælland railway station is the northern terminus of the Odsherred Line and functions as the principal railway station of the town. The western part of the town is also served by the railway halt Nyled.

== Notable people ==
- Signe Toksvig (1891 in Nykøbing, Sjælland – 1983) a Danish writer, emigrated with her family to the United States age 14, the great-aunt of Sandi Toksvig
- Anna Grue (born 1957 in Nykøbing Sjælland) crime fiction writer
- Morten Frost (born 1958 in Nykøbing, Sjælland) a former badminton player and later coach, who represented Denmark
- Stine Andersen (born 1985 in Nykøbing, Sjælland) a Danish sports shooter, competed in the Women's 10-metre air rifle event at the 2012 Summer Olympics

== Gallery ==
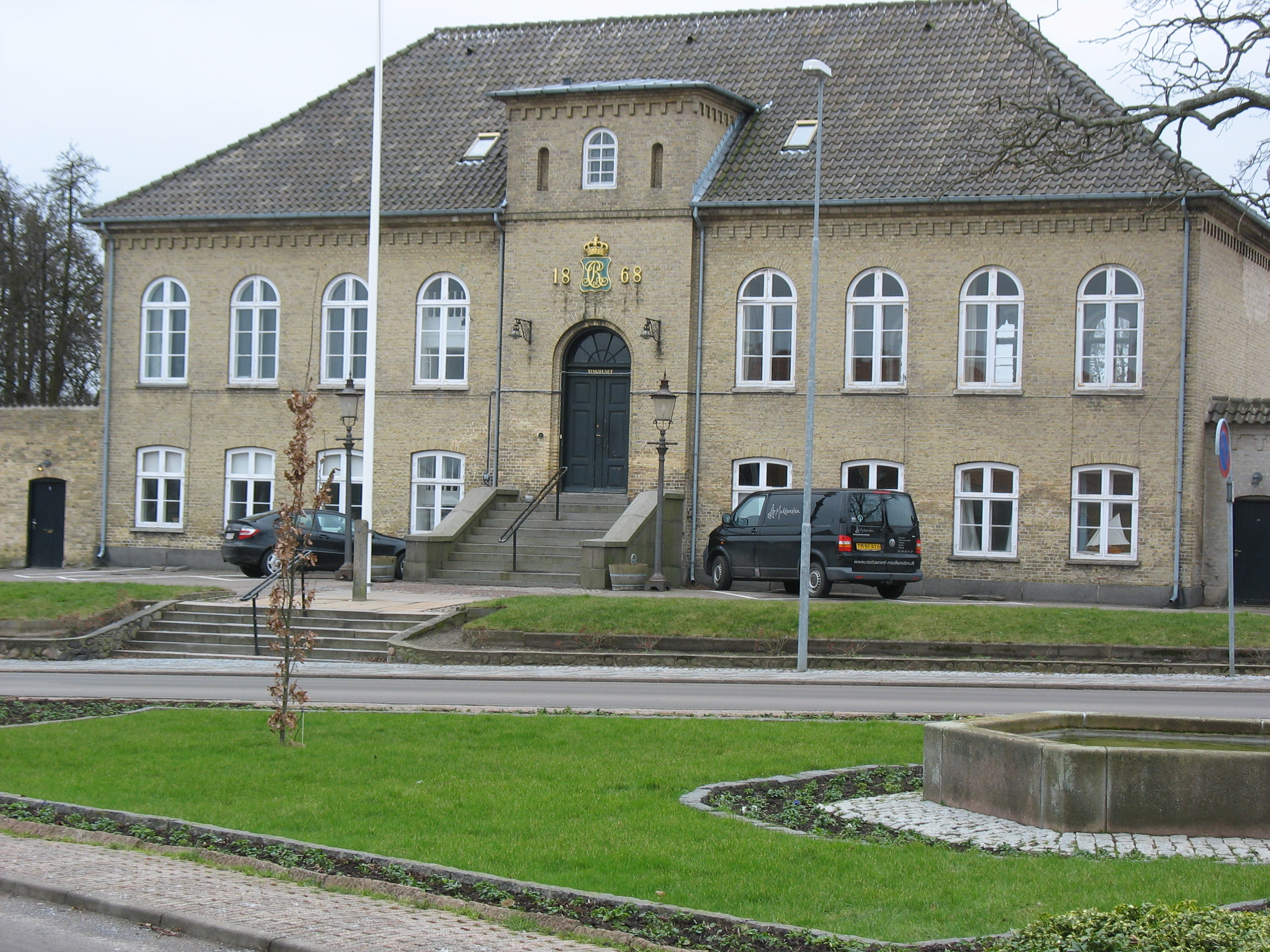
Court house

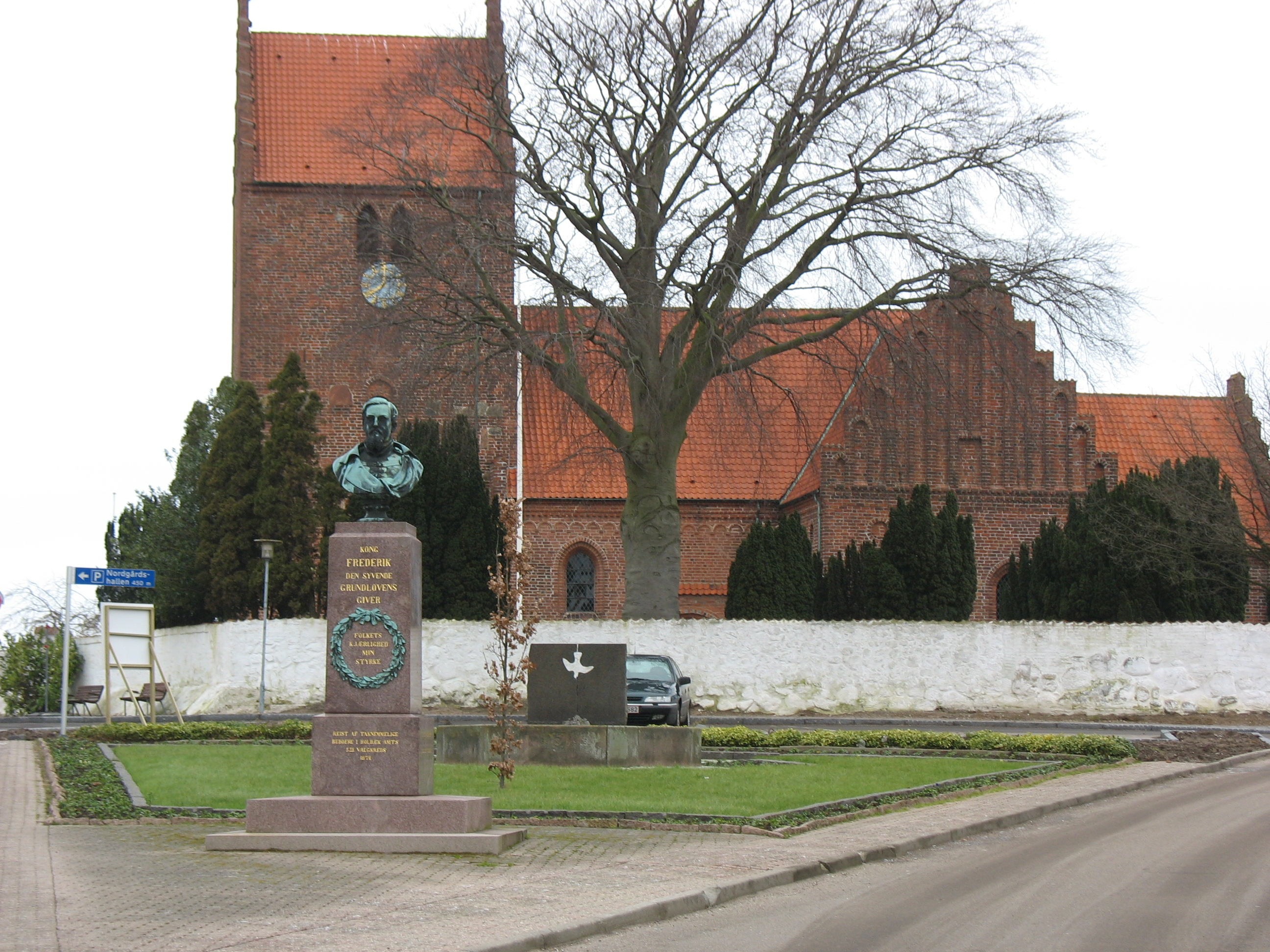
Nykøbing Sjælland Church

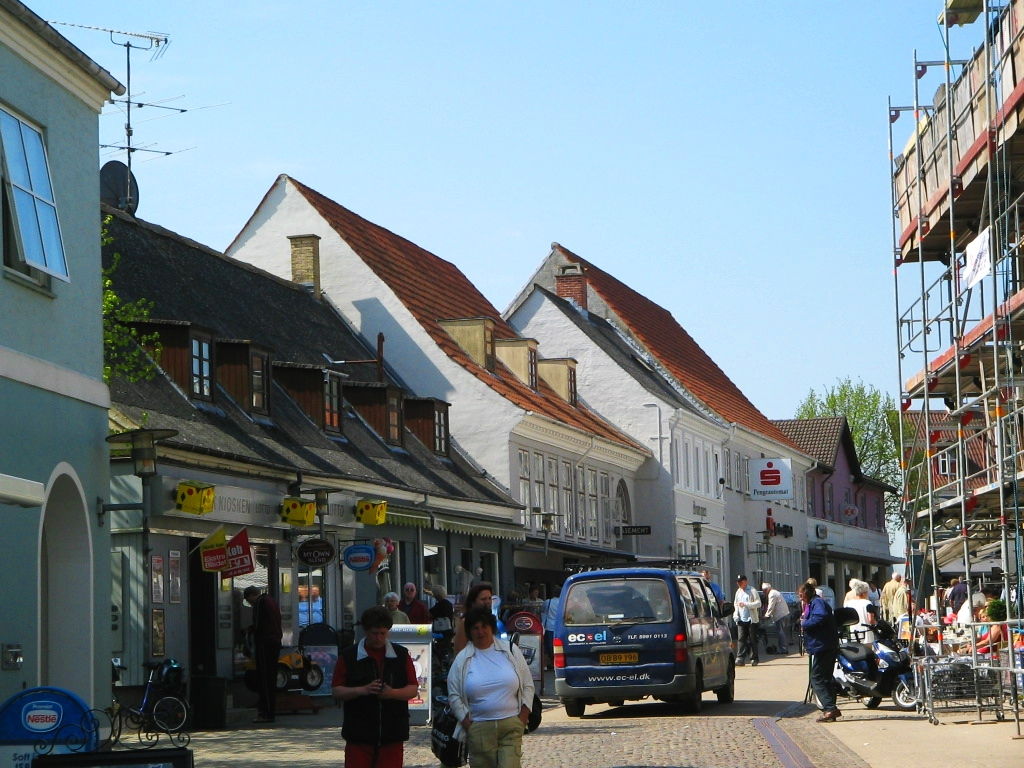
Main street "Algade" (pedestrian, shopping)
