= 2025 Odsherred municipal election =

Municipal election in Denmark

← 2021	18 November 2025	2029 →

All 25 seats to the Odsherred municipal council 13 seats needed for a majority
- Turnout: 18,853 (69.4%) ▲1.7%
	First party	Second party	Third party
	A	F	B
Party	Social Democrats	Green Left	Social Liberals
Last election	10 seats, 36.6%	1 seat, 5.6%	1 seat, 6.3%
Seats won	5	4	3
Seat change	▼5	▲3	▲2
Popular vote	3,798	2,349	2,487
Percentage	20.7%	12.8%	13.6%
Swing	▼15.8%	▲7.2%	▲7.3%
	Fourth party	Fifth party	Sixth party
	N	O	Æ
Party	Nyt Odsherred	Danish People's Party	Denmark Democrats
Last election	4 seats, 12.7%	2 seats, 7.4%	Did not stand
Seats won	3	3	2
Seat change	▼1	▲1	▲2
Popular vote	2,178	1,858	1,376
Percentage	11.9%	10.1%	7.5%
Swing	▼0.9%	▲2.8%	New
	Seventh party	Eighth party	Ninth party
	V	C	Ø
Party	Venstre	Conservatives	Red-Green Alliance
Last election	4 seats, 13.9%	1 seat, 5.3%	1 seat, 5.1%
Seats won	2	1	1
Seat change	▼2	0	0
Popular vote	1,175	883	805
Percentage	6.4%	4.8%	4.4%
Swing	▼7.5%	▼0.5%	▼0.7%
Mayor before election
Karina Vincentz
Nyt Odsherred
Mayor after election
Hanne Pigonska
Venstre

The 2025 Odsherred Municipal election was held on November 18, 2025, to elect the 25 members to sit in the regional council for the Odsherred Municipal council, in the period of 2026 to 2029. Hanne Pigonska from Venstre, would win the mayoral position.

== Background ==
Following the 2021 election, Karina Vincentz from Nyt Odsherred became mayor for her first term, following an increasingly right wing-influenced agreement, compared to the municipality's previous mayors, since the 2007 municipal reform, both 2 from the Social Democrats. She would run for a second term.

In October 2025, the municipality faced criticism over its decision to terminate subscriptions to the local media outlet Nordvestnyt across its municipal departments. The municipality’s management, including Mayor Karina Vincentz (Nyt Odsherred) and Municipal Director Claus Steen Madsen, directed all center managers to cancel subscriptions to the newspaper, citing cost concerns. The total expenditure on Nordvestnyt subscriptions was approximately 288,000 DKK, a figure significantly lower than the 415,000 DKK spent annually on subscriptions to other media outlets, which were not subject to similar reductions. Several municipal council members, including Michael Kjeldgaard (Social Democrats) and Thomas Nicolaisen (Social Liberals), criticized the move as politically motivated, arguing that it targeted Nordvestnyt because of its investigative reporting on municipal scandals, including issues in the local hospice, Lynghuset, and the management of the municipal heating system. Critics described the decision as sending a “disturbing signal” and raised concerns about limiting employees’ access to independent, critical local journalism. Roger Buch, a media scholar at the Danish School of Media and Journalism, described the decision as unusual for a municipality and warned that such targeted measures against a single media outlet were reminiscent of practices observed in more authoritarian contexts. Some council members and experts argued that the approach could be interpreted as “anti-democratic” by restricting employees’ ability to freely access critical information about the municipality.

== Electoral system ==
For elections to Danish municipalities, a number varying from 9 to 31 are chosen to be elected to the municipal council. The seats are then allocated using the D'Hondt method and a closed list proportional representation. Odsherred Municipality had 25 seats in 2025.

== Electoral alliances ==
=== Electoral Alliance 1 ===
Party		Political alignment
B	Social Liberals	Centre to Centre-left
M	Moderates	Centre to Centre-right

=== Electoral Alliance 2 ===
Party		Political alignment
C	Conservatives	Centre-right
I	Liberal Alliance	Centre-right to Right-wing
O	Danish People's Party	Right-wing to Far-right

=== Electoral Alliance 3 ===
Party		Political alignment
F	Green Left	Centre-left to Left-wing
Ø	Red-Green Alliance	Left-wing to Far-Left
Å	The Alternative	Centre-left to Left-wing

=== Electoral Alliance 4 ===
Party		Political alignment
L	Lokalt Fokus	Local politics
Æ	Denmark Democrats	Right-wing to Far-right

=== Electoral Alliance 5 ===
Party		Political alignment
N	Nyt Odsherred	Local politics
V	Venstre	Centre-right

== Results by polling station ==
Division	A	B	C	F	I	L	M	N	O	V	Æ	Ø	Å
Division	%	%	%	%	%	%	%	%	%	%	%	%	%
Asnæs	23.1	12.3	6.3	11.9	4.2	0.9	1.1	11.5	10.7	8.0	7.0	2.6	0.4
Fårevejle	20.9	8.0	4.0	14.7	6.1	2.0	0.9	10.3	9.8	7.1	11.3	3.9	0.9
Grevinge	23.6	7.8	5.4	12.2	4.8	1.8	0.8	8.3	12.9	5.7	10.9	5.4	0.4
Hørve	18.8	10.2	10.1	10.3	5.8	1.2	0.6	11.8	8.9	7.9	10.5	3.0	0.8
Odden	17.0	9.2	2.4	10.8	1.0	2.9	0.7	23.1	7.9	12.2	6.8	5.1	0.8
Vig	15.3	17.2	3.3	11.1	5.0	1.9	0.8	13.2	12.6	6.6	8.9	3.6	0.4
Hallerne i Nykøbing Sj.	25.4	12.3	3.7	14.4	3.2	2.4	0.7	13.5	10.2	5.0	4.2	3.9	1.0
Rørvig	18.0	13.6	7.0	21.6	3.0	1.7	1.5	11.3	4.8	6.2	3.1	6.2	2.1
Egebjerg Forsamlingshus	17.9	15.8	3.8	15.0	3.3	2.5	0.6	7.1	8.7	4.0	9.6	9.4	2.4
Højby	18.2	25.1	3.1	10.0	2.9	1.5	1.8	10.9	10.5	4.6	5.3	4.8	1.2
Lumsås	18.3	22.4	3.3	9.8	2.3	2.8	1.3	8.2	8.0	8.2	6.7	6.7	2.1
Nr. Asmindrup	21.7	13.0	4.1	9.5	3.5	2.4	0.2	13.0	12.8	4.6	8.9	5.8	0.4

== Results ==
Party		Votes	%	+/-	Seats	+/-
Odsherred Municipality
A	Social Democrats	3,798	20.71	-15.85	5	-5
B	Social Liberals	2,487	13.56	+7.25	3	+2
F	Green Left	2,349	12.81	+7.21	4	+3
N	Nyt Odsherred	2,178	11.87	-0.85	3	-1
O	Danish People's Party	1,858	10.13	+2.76	3	+1
Æ	Denmark Democrats	1,376	7.50	New	2	New
V	Venstre	1,175	6.41	-7.53	2	-2
C	Conservatives	883	4.81	-0.50	1	0
Ø	Red-Green Alliance	805	4.39	-0.72	1	0
I	Liberal Alliance	746	4.07	+3.64	1	+1
L	Lokalt Fokus	342	1.86	New	0	New
Å	The Alternative	175	0.95	New	0	New
M	Moderates	170	0.93	New	0	New
Total		18,342	100	N/A	25	N/A
Invalid votes		85	0.31	-0.04		
Blank votes		426	1.57	+0.63		
Turnout		18,853	69.45	+1.69		
Source: valg.dk

== Opinion polls ==
Polling firm	Fieldwork date	Sample size	A	V	N	O	B	F	C	Ø	I	L	M	Å	Æ	Others	Lead
Epinion	4 Sep - 13 Oct 2025	407	28.4	9.5	–	11.2	6.0	12.4	3.8	7.3	2.8	–	0.1	2.1	8.6	8.0	16.0
2024 european parliament election	9 Jun 2024		17.7	14.7	–	11.3	4.4	16.4	5.9	6.5	4.8	–	5.9	2.1	10.3	–	1.3
2022 general election	1 Nov 2022		33.5	11.0	–	5.1	1.7	8.7	3.1	4.0	4.9	–	10.0	2.6	9.5	–	22.5
2021 regional election	16 Nov 2021		37.0	21.6	–	8.1	5.0	5.9	6.4	6.3	0.9	–	–	0.4	–	–	15.4
2021 municipal election	16 Nov 2021		36.6 (10)	13.9 (4)	12.7 (4)	7.4 (2)	6.3 (1)	5.6 (1)	5.3 (1)	5.1 (1)	0.4 (0)	–	–	–	–	–	22.7
