= 2021 Odsherred municipal election =

← 2017	16 November 2021	2025 →

All 25 seats to the Odsherred Municipal Council 13 seats needed for a majority
- Turnout: 18,788 (67.8%) ▼5.1pp
	First party	Second party	Third party
	A	V	N
Party	Social Democrats	Venstre	Nyt Odsherred
Last election	12 seats, 43.5%	7 seats, 24.6%	Did Not Stand
Seats won	10	4	4
Seat change	▼2	▼3	▲4
Popular vote	6,743	2,570	2,348
Percentage	36.6%	13.9%	12.7%
Swing	▼6.9%	▼10.7%	New
	Fourth party	Fifth party	Sixth party
	O	B	D
Party	Danish People's Party	Social Liberals	New Right
Last election	2 seats, 9.7%	1 seat, 3.9%	0 seats, 1.3%
Seats won	2	1	1
Seat change	0	0	▲1
Popular vote	1,360	1,163	1,035
Percentage	7.4%	6.3%	5.6%
Swing	▼2.3%	▲2.4%	▲4.3%
	Seventh party	Eighth party	Ninth party
	F	C	Ø
Party	Green Left	Conservatives	Red–Green Alliance
Last election	1 seat, 3.2%	0 seats, 2.5%	1 seat, 4.9%
Seats won	1	1	1
Seat change	0	▲1	0
Popular vote	1,033	981	943
Percentage	5.6%	5.3%	5.1%
Swing	▲2.4%	▲2.8%	▲0.2%
Mayor before election
Thomas Adelskov
Social Democrats
Mayor after election
Karina Vincentz
Nyt Odsherred

Ever since the 2007 municipal reform, the Social Democrats had held the mayor's position in the municipality.

In 2017, the Social Democrats had won 12 seats, just one short of an absolute majority. Still it would be Thomas Adelskov from the party who would become mayor.

Prior to this election, a new party called Nyt Odsherred had been created to try and challenge the mayor's position for the election. They would end up winning 4 seats, and become the party to receive the 3rd highest number of votes. However they would manage, together with the Social Liberals, the Conservatives, the New Right, Danish People's Party and Venstre, to reach an agreement that would see leader of the party, Karina Vincentz become mayor.

== Electoral system ==
For elections to Danish municipalities, a number varying from 9 to 31 are chosen to be elected to the municipal council. The seats are then allocated using the D'Hondt method and a closed list proportional representation. Odsherred Municipality had 25 seats in 2021

Unlike in Danish General Elections, in elections to municipal councils, electoral alliances are allowed.

== Electoral alliances ==
=== Electoral Alliance 1 ===
Party		Political alignment
C	Conservatives	Centre-right
O	Danish People's Party	Right-wing to Far-right

=== Electoral Alliance 2 ===
Party		Political alignment
D	New Right	Right-wing to Far-right
I	Liberal Alliance	Centre-right to Right-wing
V	Venstre	Centre-right

=== Electoral Alliance 3 ===
Party		Political alignment
F	Green Left	Centre-left to Left-wing
Ø	Red–Green Alliance	Left-wing to Far-Left

=== Electoral Alliance 4 ===
Party		Political alignment
B	Social Liberals	Centre to Centre-left
N	Nyt Odsherred	Centre to Centre-right (Local politics)

== Results by polling station ==
Division	A	B	C	D	F	G	I	N	O	V	Æ	Ø
Division	%	%	%	%	%	%	%	%	%	%	%	%
Asnæs	41.9	5.6	4.9	4.5	4.7	0.3	0.3	10.1	6.9	16.4	0.3	4.2
Fårevejle	37.5	3.6	4.4	6.2	5.0	0.2	0.4	14.5	9.3	14.3	0.2	4.5
Grevinge	37.9	4.3	4.3	6.8	5.1	0.4	0.5	12.9	7.7	15.2	0.6	4.3
Hørve	34.0	3.9	7.8	6.9	4.9	0.2	0.3	11.1	10.4	15.7	0.3	4.6
Rørvig	34.3	5.1	7.3	3.0	8.8	0.8	0.3	14.3	3.7	15.1	0.0	7.2
Nykøbing	44.7	4.9	4.1	5.9	7.0	0.6	0.3	13.3	5.4	9.3	0.5	4.0
Vig	24.1	10.5	8.1	6.8	4.5	0.6	0.9	12.5	10.7	16.8	0.3	4.3
Odden	33.1	4.4	4.0	3.3	3.3	0.3	0.1	32.4	5.5	7.8	0.4	5.4
Egebjerg	27.6	6.4	3.7	7.1	8.4	1.0	0.7	8.3	5.7	17.7	0.9	12.6
Højby	35.0	12.0	5.0	4.6	4.9	1.8	0.5	9.4	7.0	14.1	0.7	4.9
Lumsås	36.3	10.4	4.1	4.8	6.8	0.5	0.7	10.4	4.1	13.3	1.0	7.5
Nr. Asmindrup	33.2	7.3	6.2	5.0	4.1	0.7	0.9	10.7	8.9	14.4	0.4	8.2

== Results ==
Party		Votes	%	+/-	Seats	+/-
Odsherred Municipality
A	Social Democrats	6,743	36.56	-6.91	10	-2
V	Venstre	2,570	13.93	-10.63	4	-3
N	Nyt Odsherred	2,348	12.73	New	4	New
O	Danish People's Party	1,360	7.37	-2.35	2	0
B	Social Liberals	1,163	6.30	+2.41	1	0
D	New Right	1,035	5.61	+4.28	1	+1
F	Green Left	1,033	5.60	+2.42	1	0
C	Conservatives	981	5.32	+2.84	1	+1
Ø	Red-Green Alliance	943	5.11	+0.21	1	0
G	Vegan Party	113	0.61	New	0	New
Æ	Freedom List	79	0.43	New	0	New
I	Liberal Alliance	78	0.42	-0.25	0	0
Total		18,446	100	N/A	25	N/A
Invalid votes		97	0.35	+0.21		
Blank votes		245	0.88	+0.15		
Turnout		18,788	67.75	-5.11		
Source: valg.dk
