= List of churches in Odsherred Municipality =

1: Odden Parish 2: Højby Parish 3: Nykøbing Sj Parish 4: Rørvig Parish 5: Nørre Asmindrup Parish 6: Vig Parish 7: Egebjerg Parish 8: Fårevejle Parish 9: Asnæs Parish 10: Grevinge Parish 11: Vallekilde Parish 12: Hørve Parish 13: Lumsås Parish

This list of churches in Odsherred Municipality lists church buildings in Odsherred Municipality, Denmark. The municipality is located in the northwestern corner of the island of Zealand.

== Overview ==
Odsherred Municipality belongs to the Diocese of Roskilde, a diocese within the Evangelical Lutheran Church of Denmark. It is divided into 13 parishes. A fourteenth church in the municipality, Vallekilde valgmenighedskirke, is associated with Vallekilde Folk High School.

== List ==
Name	Location	Year	Coordinates	Image	Refs
Asnæs Church	Asnæs	c. 1150	55°48′35.7″N 11°20′54.5″E		
Egebjerg Church	Egebjerg	12th century	55°50′42.7″N 11°40′49.5″E		
Fårevejle Church	Fårevejle	c. 1100	55°48′8.92″N 11°26′32.67″E		
Grevinge Church	Grevinge	c. 1170	55°47′54.3″N 11°33′15.3″E		
Højby Church	Højby	c. 1150	55°44′46″N 11°35′58″E		
Hørve Church	Hørve		55°45′27″N 11°27′17″E		
Lumsås Church	Lumsås	1896			
Nørre Asmindrup Church	Nørre Asmindrup	12th century	55°53′15.76″N 11°37′18.58″E		
Nykøbing Sjælland Church	Nykøbing Sjælland	c. 1125			
Odden Church	Odden	13th century	55°57′32.04″N 11°23′52.85″E		
Rørvig Church	Rørvig	c. 1150	55°56′52.5″N 11°26′32.67″E		
Vallekilde Church	Vallekilde	12th century			
	Vallekilde	1882			
Vig Church	Nykøbing Sjælland				

== See also ==
- List of churches in Vordingborg Municipality
- List of churches in Faxe Municipality
- List of churches in Holbæk Municipality
