= Egebjerg =

Egebjerg is the name of several places in Denmark:

- Egebjerg, Horsens, in Horsens Municipality
- Egebjerg, Odsherred Municipality; see List of churches in Odsherred Municipality
- Egebjerg Church, a church in Fredensborg Municipality
- Egebjerg Municipality, a former municipality on the island of funen, now a part of Svendborg Municipality
- Transmitter Egebjerg, one of the tallest structures in Denmark
