= Listed buildings in Odsherred Municipality =

This is a list of listed buildings in Odsherred Municipality, Denmark.

== The list ==
=== 4500 Nykøbing Sj ===
Listing name	Image	Location	Coordinates	Description	
Annebergparken		Annebergparken 1, 4500 Nykøbing Sj	1915	Guard house	Ref
Annebergparken		Annebergparken 2, 4500 Nykøbing Sj	1915	Guard house	Ref
Annebergparken		Annebergparken 26A, 4500 Nykøbing Sj	1915	House in brick with half hipped roof	Ref
Annebergparken		Annebergparken 26, 4500 Nykøbing Sj	Toilet building from 1915 Ref		
Annebergparken		Annebergparken 28A, 4500 Nykøbing Sj	1915	Former kitchen and laundry building of the former Nykøbing Psychiatric Hospital	Ref
Annebergparken		Annebergparken 28B, 4500 Nykøbing Sj	1915	Former boiler house	Ref
Annebergparken		Annebergparken 28C, 4500 Nykøbing Sj	1915	Engine house	Ref
Annebergparken		Annebergparken 28D, 4500 Nykøbing Sj	1915	Fire station (Sprøjtehus)	Ref
Annebergparken		Annebergparken 35, 4500 Nykøbing Sj	1915	Administration building and church	Ref
Annebergparken		Annebergparken 48, 4500 Nykøbing Sj	1915	Nurses' building (Plejerskebygningen)	Ref
Annebergparken		Annebergparken 50, 4500 Nykøbing Sj	1915	Assembly building of the former Nykøbing Psychiatric Hospital	Ref
Annebergparken		Annebergparken 52, 4500 Nykøbing Sj	1915	Workshop building of the former Nykøbing Psychiatric Hospital	Ref
Annebergparken 32; Chapel and cemetery		Annebergparken 32, 4500 Nykøbing Sj	1915	Chapel from 1915 designed by ristoffer Varming and cemetery designed by the landscape architect J. P.Andersen	Ref4
Egebjerg Rectory		Ved Kirken 6, 4500 Nykøbing Sj	1776	Rectiry from 1776	Ref4
Egebjerg Rectory		Ved Kirken 6, 4500 Nykøbing Sj	1776	Rectiry from 1776	Ref4
Egebjerg Rectory		Ved Kirken 6, 4500 Nykøbing Sj	1776	Rectiry from 1776	Ref4
Egebjerg Rectory		Ved Kirken 6, 4500 Nykøbing Sj	1776	Rectiry from 1776	Ref4
Klintegården		Klintvej 64, 4500 Nykøbing Sj	1880	Three-winged house from 1917 designed by Peder Vilhelm Jensen-Klint, including water well, wall and cruciform stone podium for the flag pole	Ref4
Linneavej 5		Linneavej 5, 4583 Sjællands Odde	1837	Summer house from 1967 designed by Gerhdt Bornebusch	Ref
Lodsoldermandens Hus		Toldbodvej 73, 4581 Rørvig	1671	Three-winged complex from 1671 and later	Ref
Lumsås Windmill		Lumsås Møllevej 6, 4500 Nykøbing Sj	1837	Windmill from 1837	Ref
Nykøbing Old Town Hall		Holtets Plads 1, 4500 Nykøbing Sj	1868	Former town hall and courthouse from 1868 designed by Niels Sigfred Nebelong	Ref
Peter's House		Smedestræde 8, 4581 Rørvig	c. 1800	14 bay long, half timbered house with thatched roof from c. 1800	Ref
Rørvig Windmill		Søndervangsvej 7, 4581 Rørvig	1842	Windmill from 1842	Ref
The Round House		Røgerivej 1, 4583 Sjællands Odde	1956	Round house from 1956 designed by Arne Jacobsen	Ref

=== 4534 Hørve ===
Listing name	Image	Location	Coordinates	Description	
Dragsholm Castle		Dragsholm Alle 1, 4534 Hørve		Three-winged main building	Ref4
Ellemosegård		Søndergade 23, 4534 Hørve	1776	Four-winged farmhouse of which the main (north) and west wings date from 177, the south wing is from c. 1842 and the east wing is from 1850, all of which rebuilt in 1918, as well as the cobbled courtyard with sharpening stone and pear tree	Ref4
Ellemosegård		Søndergade 23, 4534 Hørve	1776	Four-winged farmhouse of which the main (north) and west wings date from 177, the south wing is from c. 1842 and the east wing is from 1850, all of which rebuilt in 1918, as well as the cobbled courtyard with sharpening stone and pear tree	Ref4
Hytten		Højskolevej 17, 4534 Hørve	1893	Timber-clad, hald-timbered house from 1893 designed by Martin Nyrop	Ref4
Højskolevej 21		Højskolevej 21, 4534 Hørve	1879	Timber-clad, hald-timbered house from 1879 designed by Andreas Bentsen	Ref4
Håndværkerskolen		Højskolevej 19, 4534 Hørve	1880	The L-shaped building is a former crafts school associated with Vallekilde Folk High School and designed by Andreas Bentsen	Ref4
Rødegård		Kolåsvej 10A, 4534 Hørve	c. 1650	|Ref	
Vallekilde Folk High School		Højskolevej 9, 4534 Hørve	1842	Folk high school originally built in 1856, extended in 1876 and finally altered and extended by Martin Nyrop in 1907	
Vallekilde Folk High School		Højskolevej 9, 4534 Hørve	1842	Øvelseshuset: Gym house from 1884 designed by Andreas Bentsen and Martin Nyrop	
Vallekilde Folk High School's school of weaving and sloyd		Højskolevej 4, 4534 Hørve	1842	Two-storey educational building from 1888 designed by Andreas Bentsen and altered Ivar Bentsen in 1918	Ref

=== 4573 Højby ===
Listing name	Image	Location	Coordinates	Description	
Gudmindrup		Gudmindrup Skovsti 15, 4573 Højby	1937	Summer house from 1937 designed by Arne Jacobsen	Ref4
Gudmindrup		Gudmindrup Skovsti 15, 4573 Højby	1937	Summer house from 1937 designed by Arne Jacobsen	Ref4
Stenstrup Forsamlingshus		Stenstrupvej 41, 4573 Højby	1880/1900	Community centre from 1880 and attached residence from 1900 with later connector wing	Ref
Stenstrup Forsamlingshus		Stenstrupvej 41, 4573 Højby	1880/1900	Community centre from 1880 and attached residence from 1900 with later connector wing	Ref

=== 4581 Rørvig ===
Listing name	Image	Location	Year built	Description	
Korshagenhus		Korshage Fjordvej 1, 4581 Rørvig	1960	Summer house from 1960 designed by Erik Korshagen	Ref
Korshagenhus		Korshage Fjordvej 1, 4581 Rørvig	1965	Garage building from 1965 designed by Erik Korshagen	Ref
Korshagenhus		Korshage Fjordvej 1, 4581 Rørvig	1986	Guesthouse from 1986 designed by Erik Korshagen	Ref
