= Korshagehus =

Listed building in Denmark

Korshagenhus
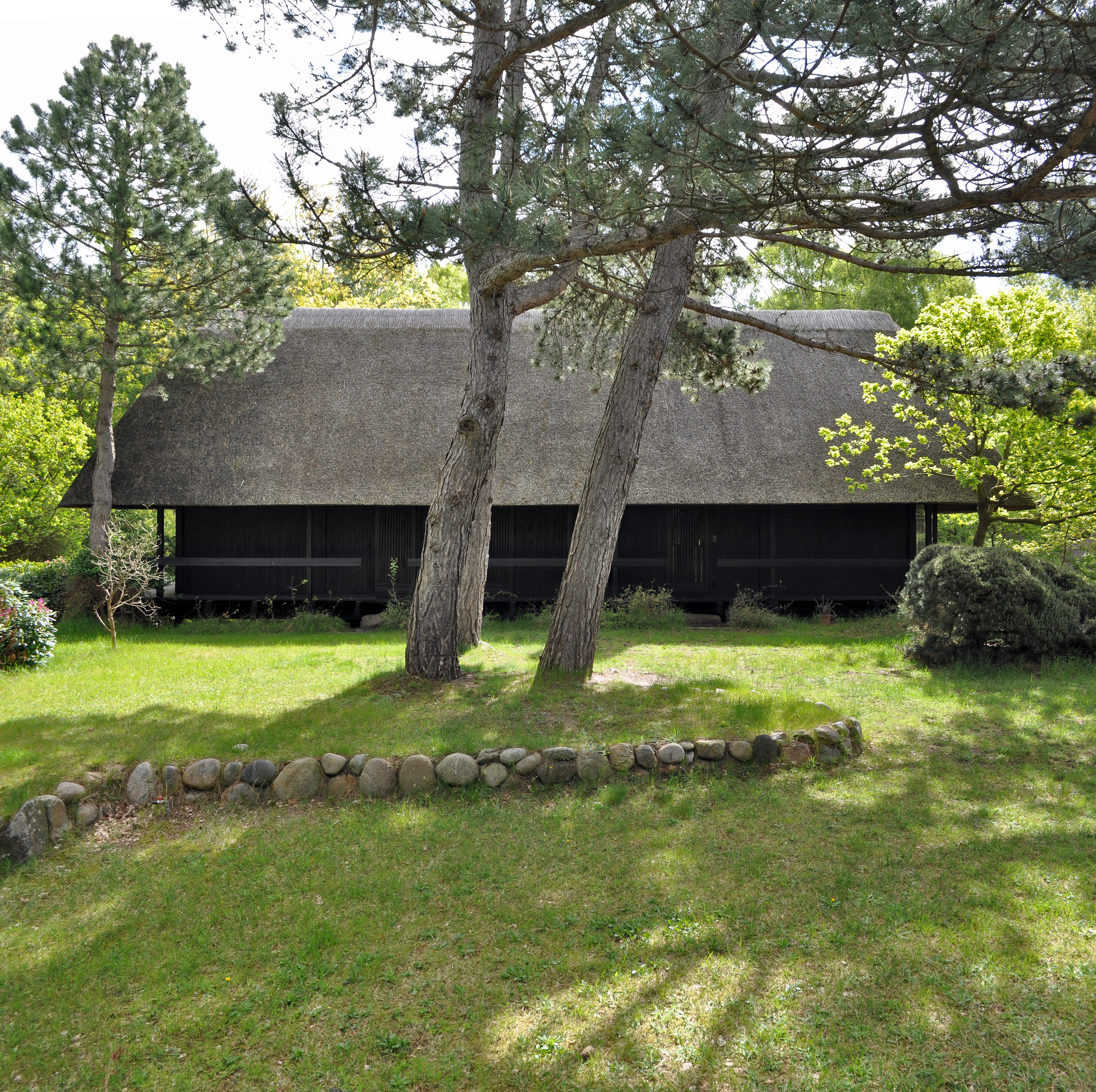
- Interactive map of the Korshagenhus area

General information
- Architectural style: Modernism
- Location: Korshage Fjordvej 1, 4581 Rørvig, Denmark
- Coordinates: 55°58′4.01″N 11°46′27.44″E
- Completed: 1960

Design and construction
- Architect: Erik Korshagen

Korshagehus, situated at Korshage Fjordvej 1, just north of Rørvig, Odsherred Municipality, Denmark, is a Modernist summer house constructed in 1960 by architect Erik Korshagen for his own use. A garage and a guesthouse were added by him in 1965 and 1984. The three buildings were listed on the Danish registry of protected buildings and places in 1999. They are all constructed in timber with steep, thatched roofs to a Minimalist design with inspiration from Japanese architecture. The summer house is located on top of a former coastal cliff whereas the two other buildings are situated at the foot of it. The paving around and between the buildings are also part of the heritage listing.

== Architecture ==
Korshagehus is a single-storey building constructed in timber on poles with Cantilever boardwalks on three sides. The building is topped by a steep, thatched, half-hipped roof. The roof ridge is pierced by a white-washed chimney. The walls are faced with vertical boarding, intrerupted by doorways with large glazed sections which can be closed by shutters, and a glazed south gable. The house has a rectangular floor plan measuring 18 x 4 metre. A plastered and black-painted brick basement has later been added below the central part of the building to provide support for the timber structure.

The interior has a symmetrical lay-out along the length of the building. The southern portion of the building contains a large living room, partly separated from the adjacent kitchen by the central brick core with fireplace and cupboards. The lower part of the brick core is faced with vertical boarding . Its upper part features a raku relief created by Bjørn Nørgaard in around 1987. The northern part of the building contains first two small rooms, then a bathroom flanked by two corridors, and finally, furthest to the north, a sleeping room in the full width of the building. The attic is one large room without any sources of natural light. The basement contains sauna and a couple of storage rooms.

== Gallery ==
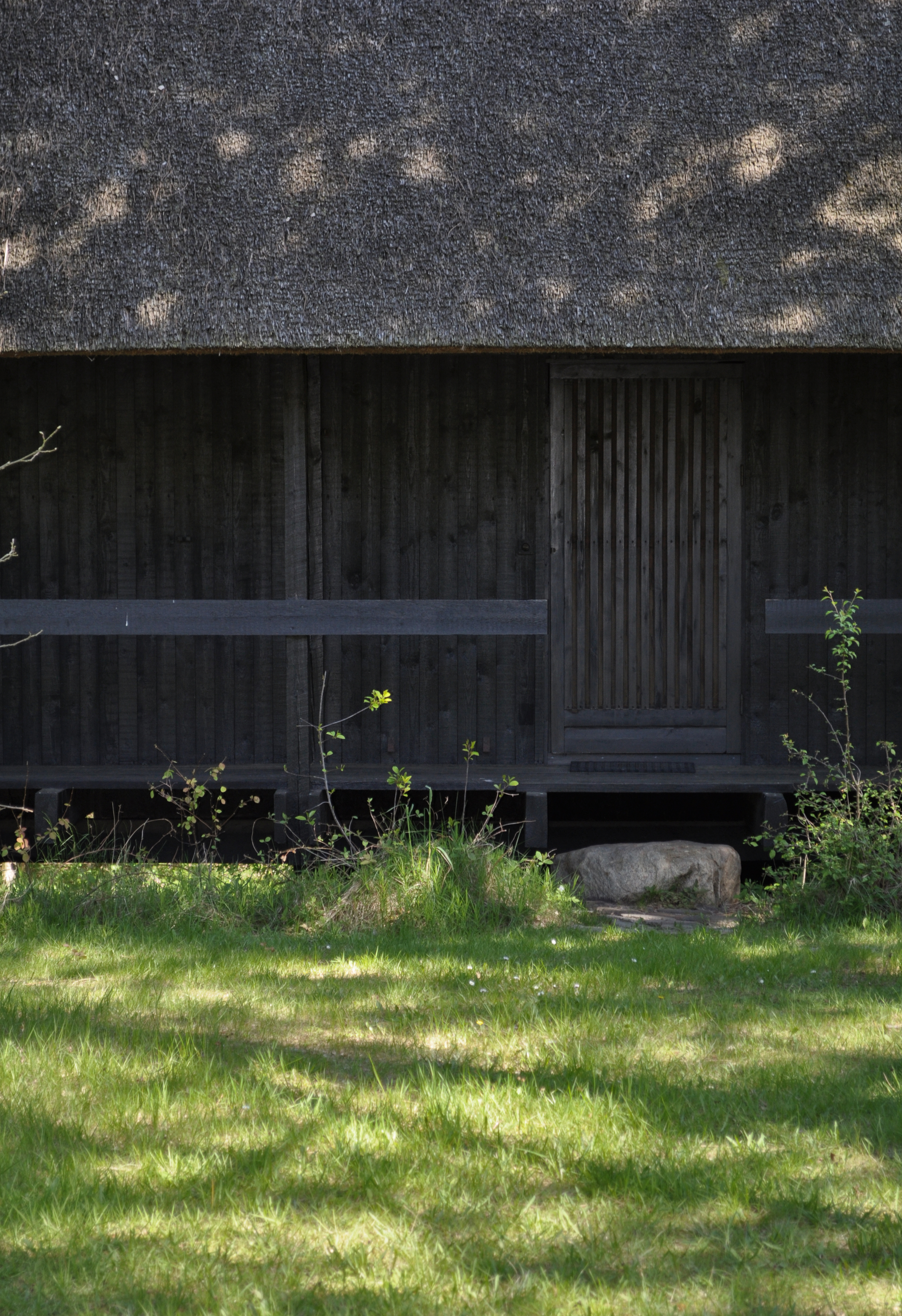

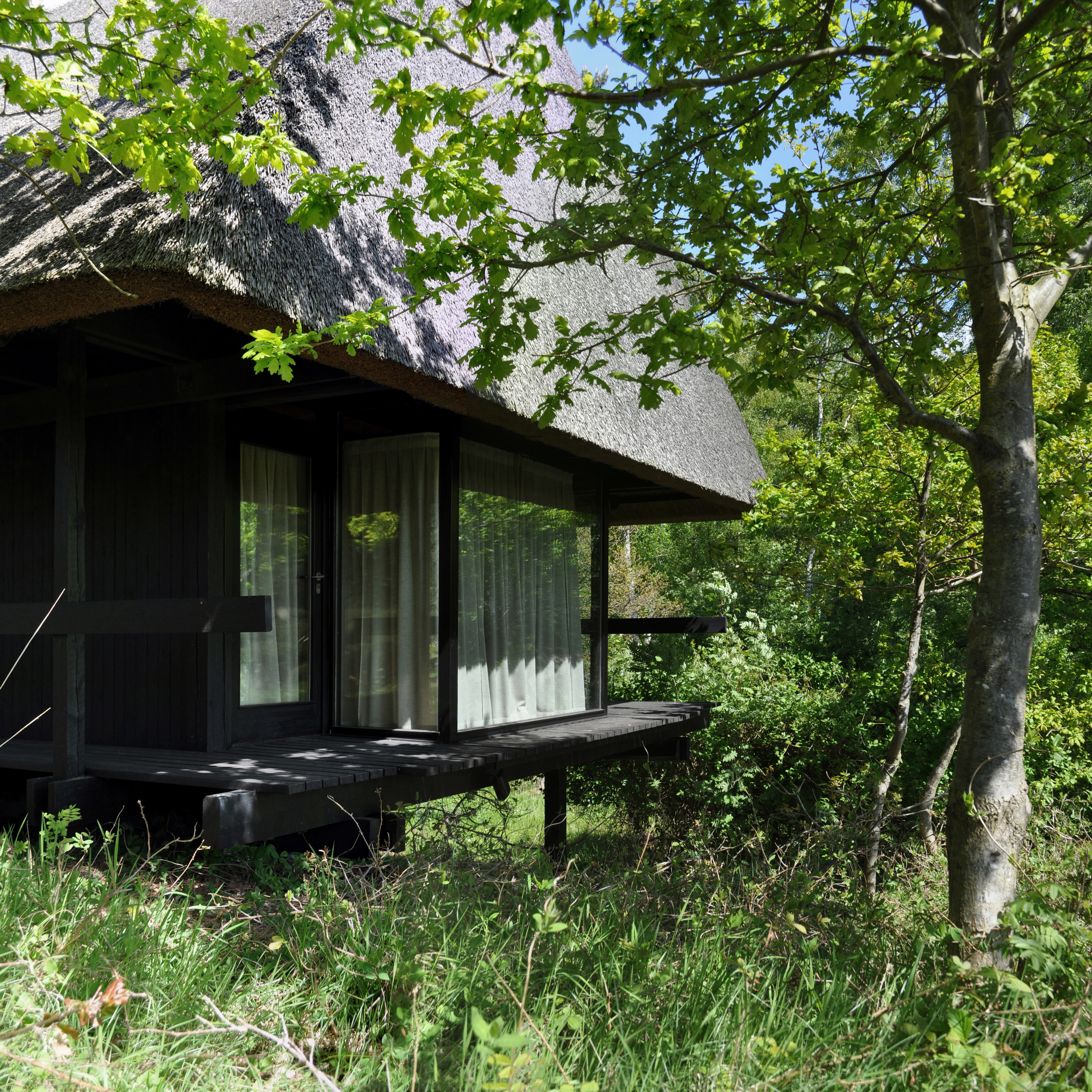

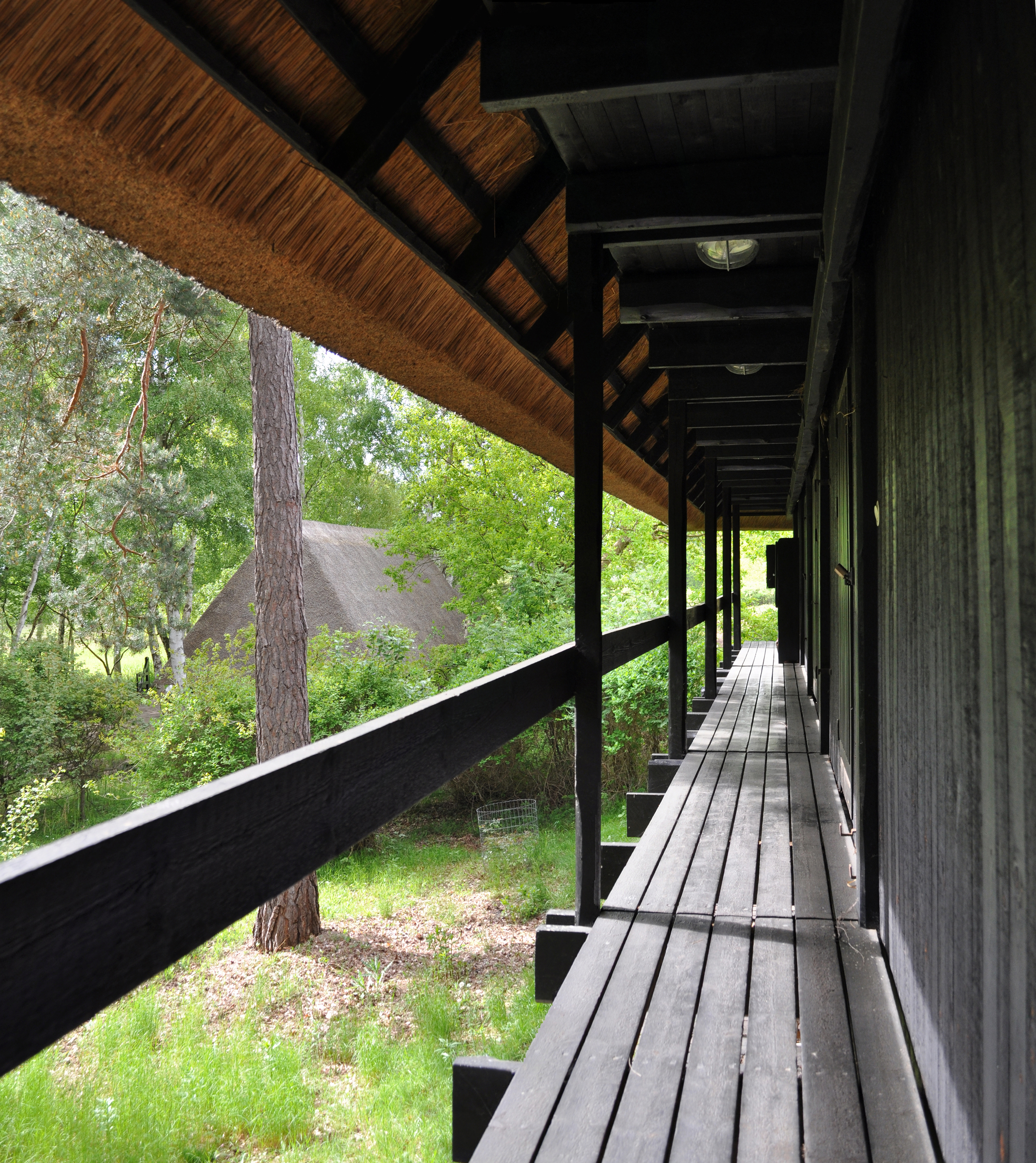

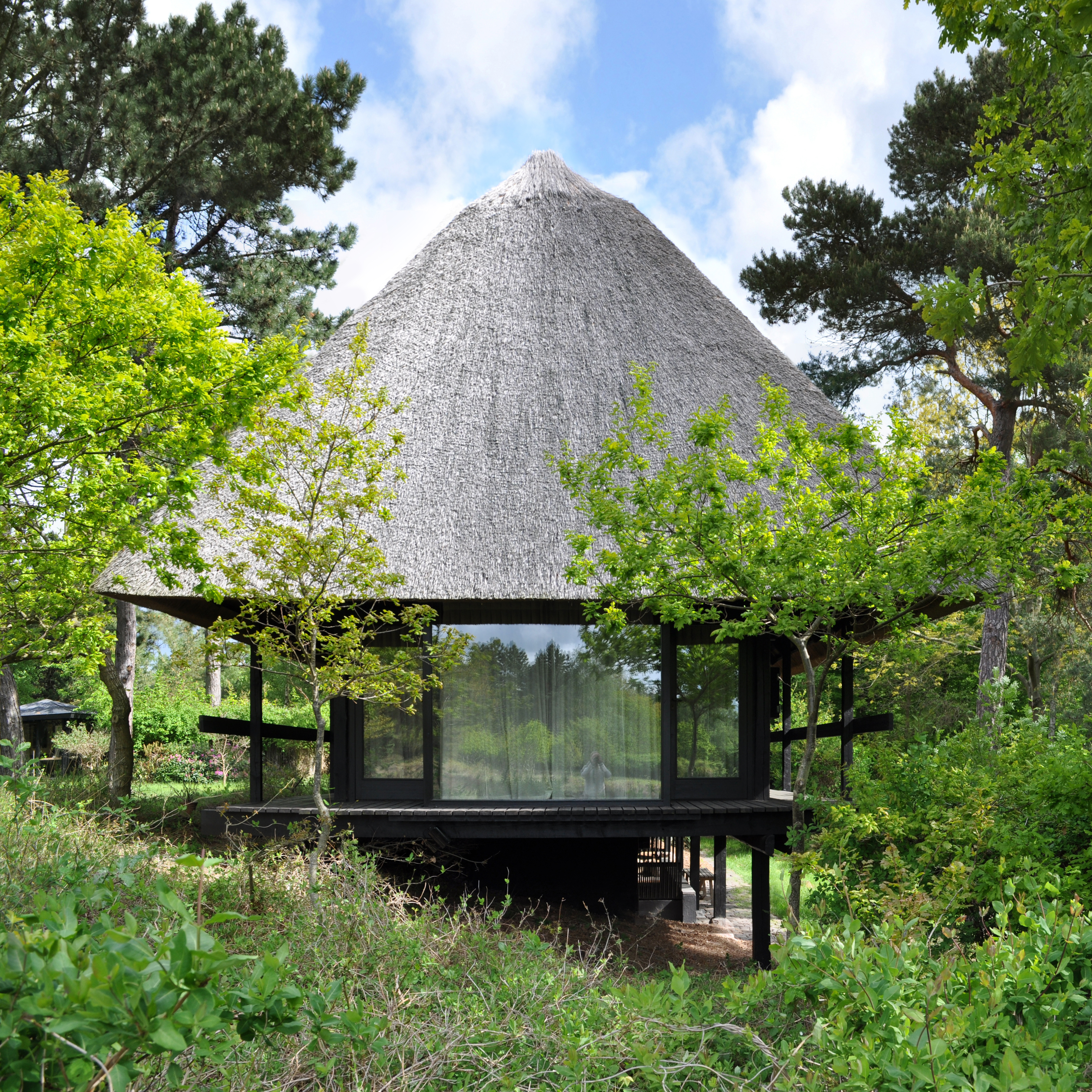

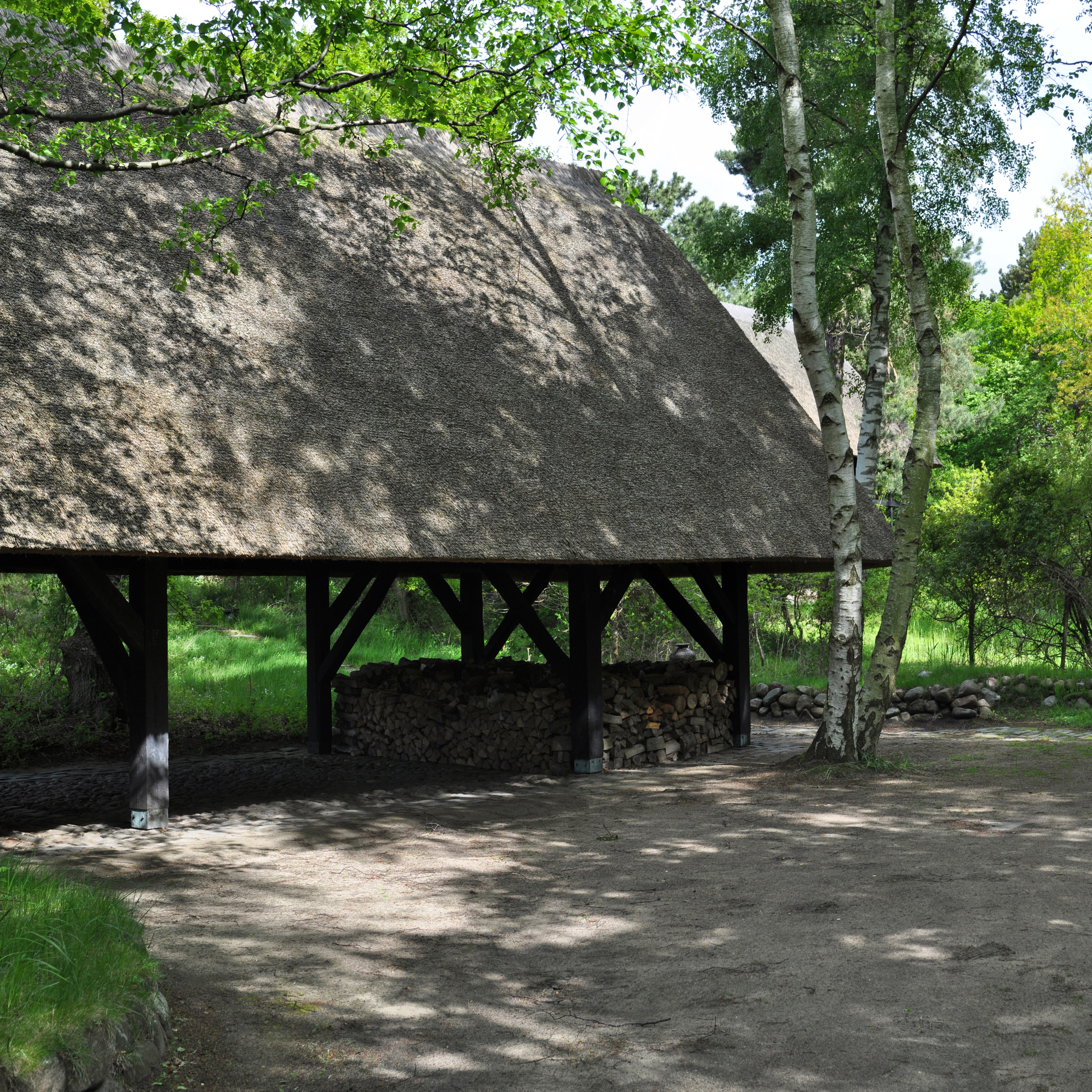
Garage

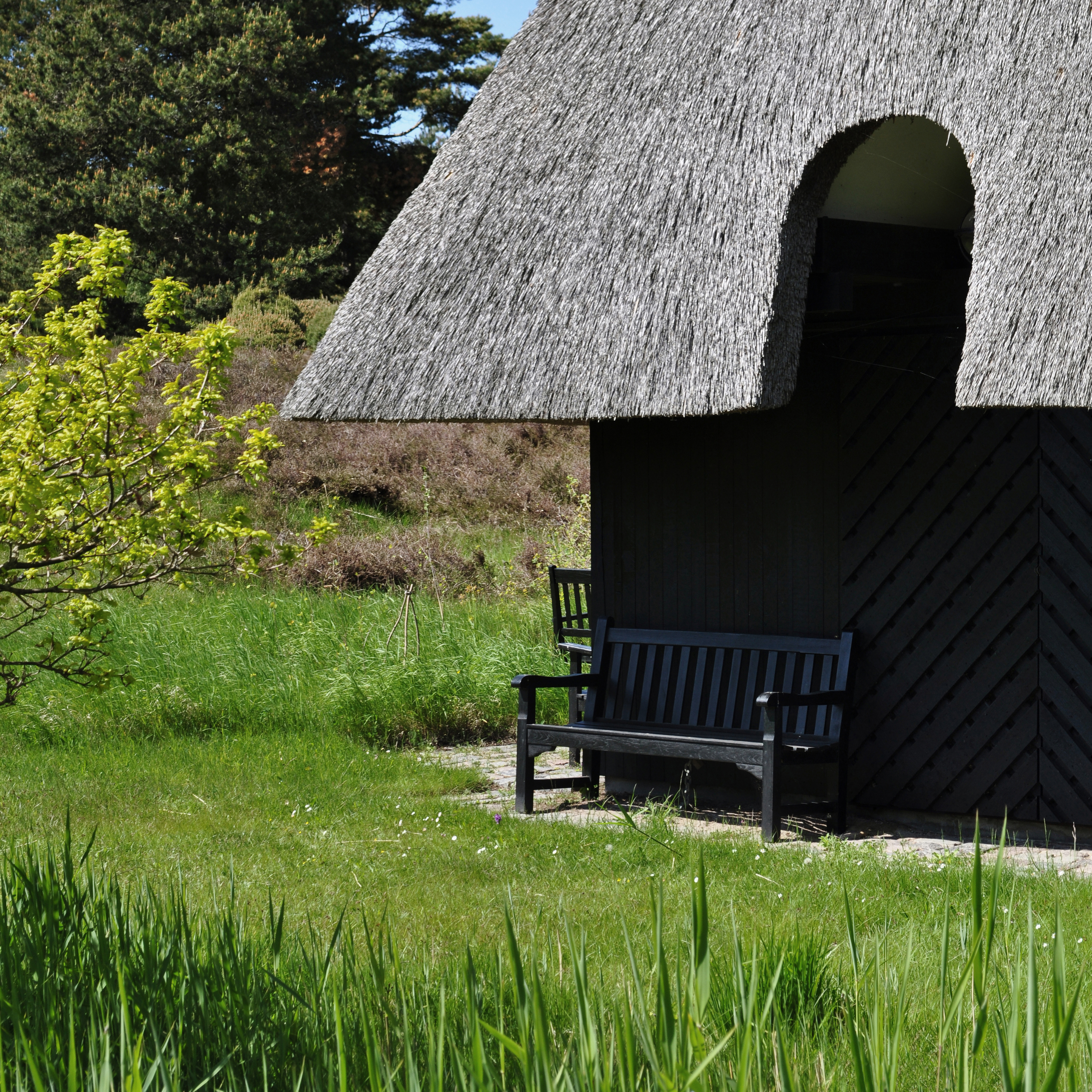
The guesthouse.
