= Nielsine Petersen =

Danish sculptor (1851–1916)

Nielsine Caroline Petersen
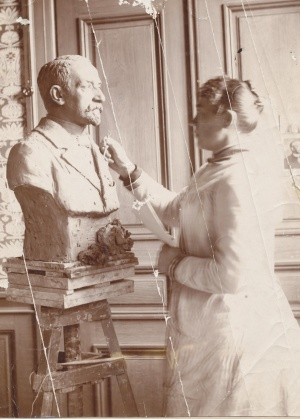
- Petersen working on a bust in her Copenhagen studio, c. 1890
- Born: July 10, 1853; Nyrup, Odsherred Municipality, Denmark
- Died: November 26, 1916 (aged 63); Hellerup, Denmark
- Burial place: Hellerup Cemetery

Nielsine Petersen (10 July 1851 – 26 November 1916) was a Danish sculptor. She was best known for her bronze statues and her work as a court sculptor. Today, she is most famous for her bronze statue of Hamlet and for En dreng, der fisker krabber (1884).

She received a number of foreign honours, including the French Ordre des Palmes académiques, the Russian Medal of Merit, and the British Order of Merit for Art and Science. In 1908, she was awarded the Ingenio et arti medal.

== Early life and education ==
Nielsine Caroline Petersen was born on 10 July 1853 in Nyrup, a village in the parish Højby on the island of Zealand. She was the daughter of Mads Petersen (1875–1884) and Kirstine née Madsen (1826–c. 1885). From a young age, Petersen wanted to be a sculptor. Her parents, however, did not want her to pursue a career as an artist. It was only after falling seriously ill at the age of 22 that she was permitted to pursue sculpture as a profession.

In 1877, at the age of 24, she moved to Copenhagen and became a student at Vilhelm Kyhn's drawing school, after which she received instruction from sculptors Jens Adolf Jerichau, Theobald Stein, and August Saabye. Saabye is considered to have had the greatest impact on her artistic development. Her style was also influenced by the classical work of Bertel Thorvaldsen as well as contemporary French naturalism.

== Career ==
Her work was exhibited for the first time at the 1880 Charlottenborg Spring Exhibition where she displayed a plaster bust. She continued to present work at the exhibition nearly annually for the rest of her life. In 1883, her statuette En dansende Faun won the Neuhausenske Præmier.

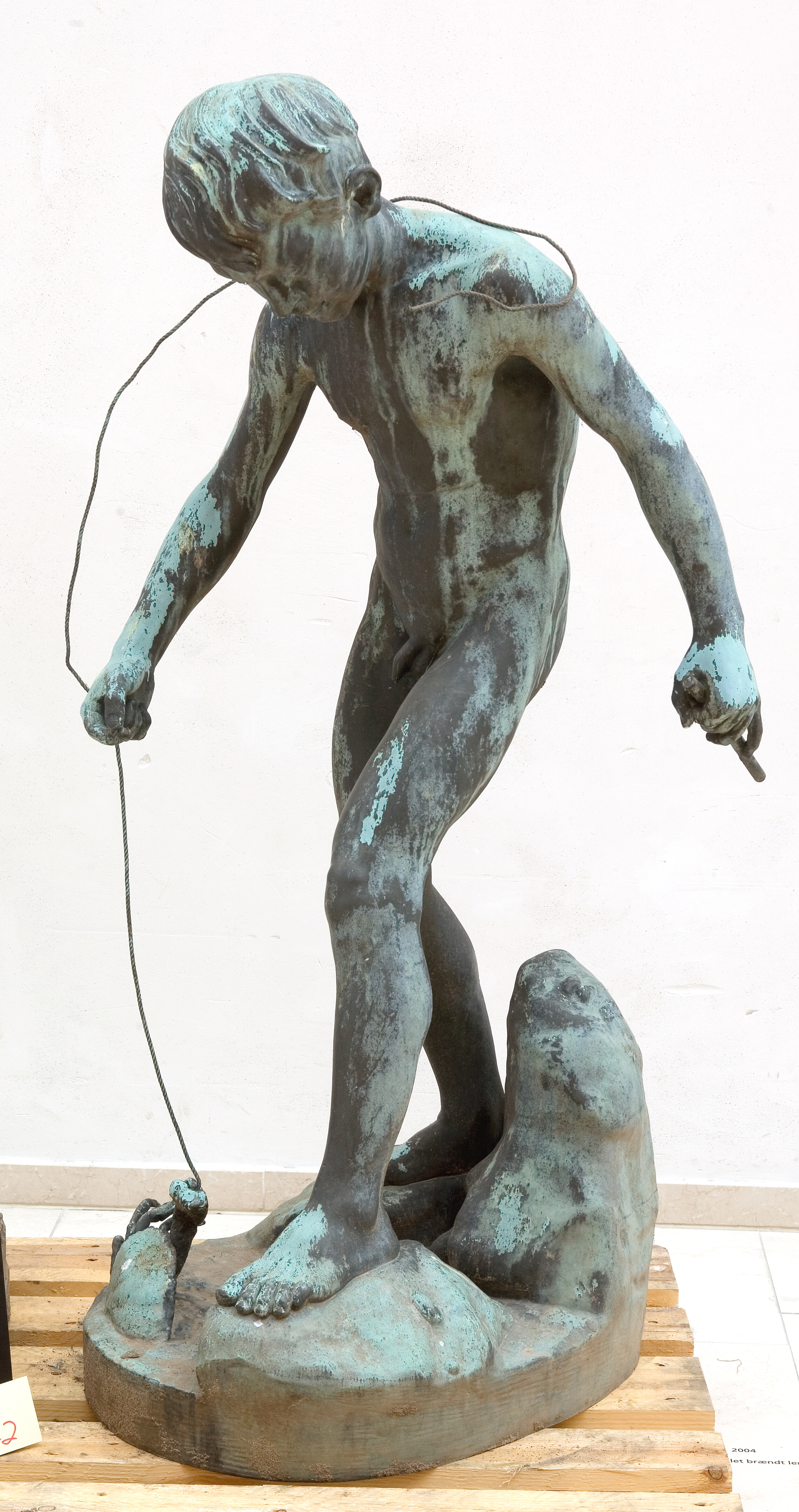
En dreng, der fisker krabber, bronze statue, 1884

Petersen was not initially permitted to enter the Royal Danish Academy of Fine Arts, as it only became open to women in 1888. Despite not being a member of the academy, she was permitted to participate in an 1887 competition where her plaster relief, Naomi siger Farvel til sine Sønnesønner, won her a gold medal. This, along with several smaller scholarships she had been awarded, allowed her to study in Paris, where she then resided for a period. While in Paris, she studied under sculptor Henri Chapu. In 1890, she exhibited the statue Ismail at the Salon. It received an honorable mention at the exhibition and later, in 1893, was awarded the Eibeschütz Præmie.

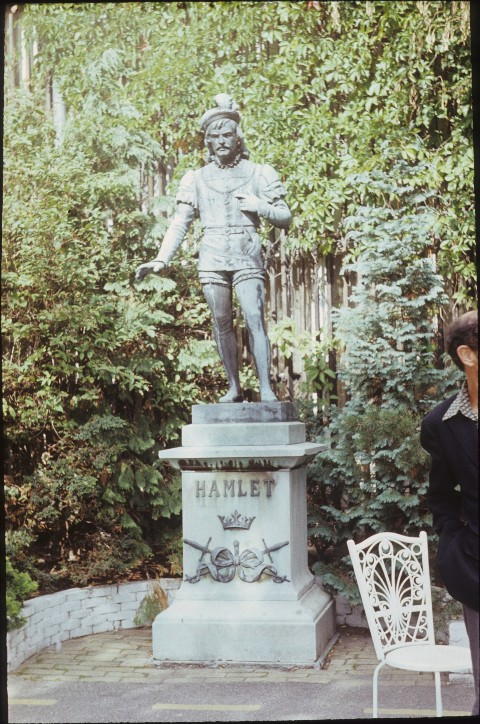
Hamlet, bronze statue, 1900

Petersen was particularly regarded as a court sculptor. Her first royal commission was a memorial to Tsar Alexander III of Russia. Petersen's design was granted approval by his widow, Maria Feodorovna, and permitted by Christian IX to be erected at Fredensborg Palace. The bronze bust was placed on a granite pedestal on the palace's grounds. She later executed busts and statues several of members of the Danish royal family, including Louise of Sweden, Frederick VIII, Christian IX, and George I of Greece. In 1901, she was invited on an eleven-day visit to Buckingham Palace by Edward VII and Alexandra of Denmark.

She initially had a studio on Bredgade in Copenhagen and then in a villa on Hultmannsvej in Hellerup. She died on 26 November 1916 in Hellerup and was buried at Hellerup Cemetery.
