= Malergården =

Listed building in Denmark

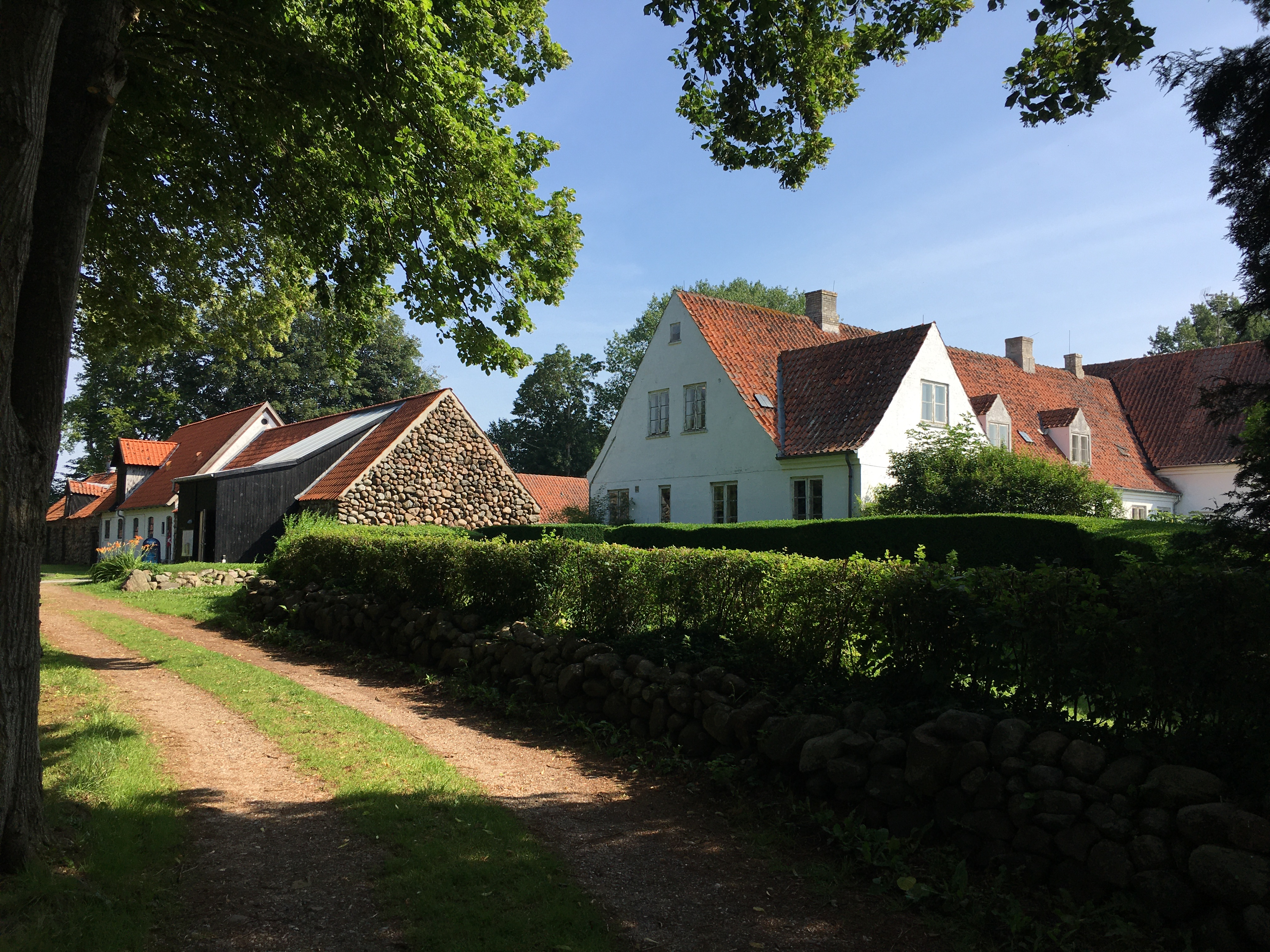
- Interactive map of the Malergården area

General information
- Architectural style: Modernism
- Location: Plejerupvej 10, 4571 Grevinge, Denmark
- Coordinates: 55°47′22.2″N 11°37′22.8″E
- Completed: 1034

Design and construction
- Architect: Agnethe Swane

Malergården, situated at Plejerup, Odsherred Municipality, is the former home of painter Sigurd Swane. It is now operated as a historic house museum.

== History ==
Swane was born in Frederiksberg. He studied in Copenhagen at the Royal Danish Academy of Art from 1899 until 1903. That year, he made his official debut at the Charlottenborg Spring Exhibition. In 1921, he married his second wife Agnete Swane (1893 - 1994), likewise a painter but also with an interest in architecture. They initially lived in Hellerup with their children Hanne, Gerda and Henrik.

In the early 1930s, they fulfilled an old dream of living in the countryside when they bought a farm in Odsherred. The present building was constructed for them in 1932. The building was designed by Agnete Swane.

The writer Valdemar Rørdam lived with the Swane family at Malergården from 1939 to 1946.

Agnethe Swane died in 1950. Sigurd Sane resided in the building until his death in 1974. Their three children kept the property after their father's death. In 1099. Gerda Swane published the book Swanerne på Malergården. In 2004, shortly prior to her death, she presented Malergården to Odsherred Museum as a gift. Her brother Henrik resided in the east wing until his death in 2011.

== Gallery ==
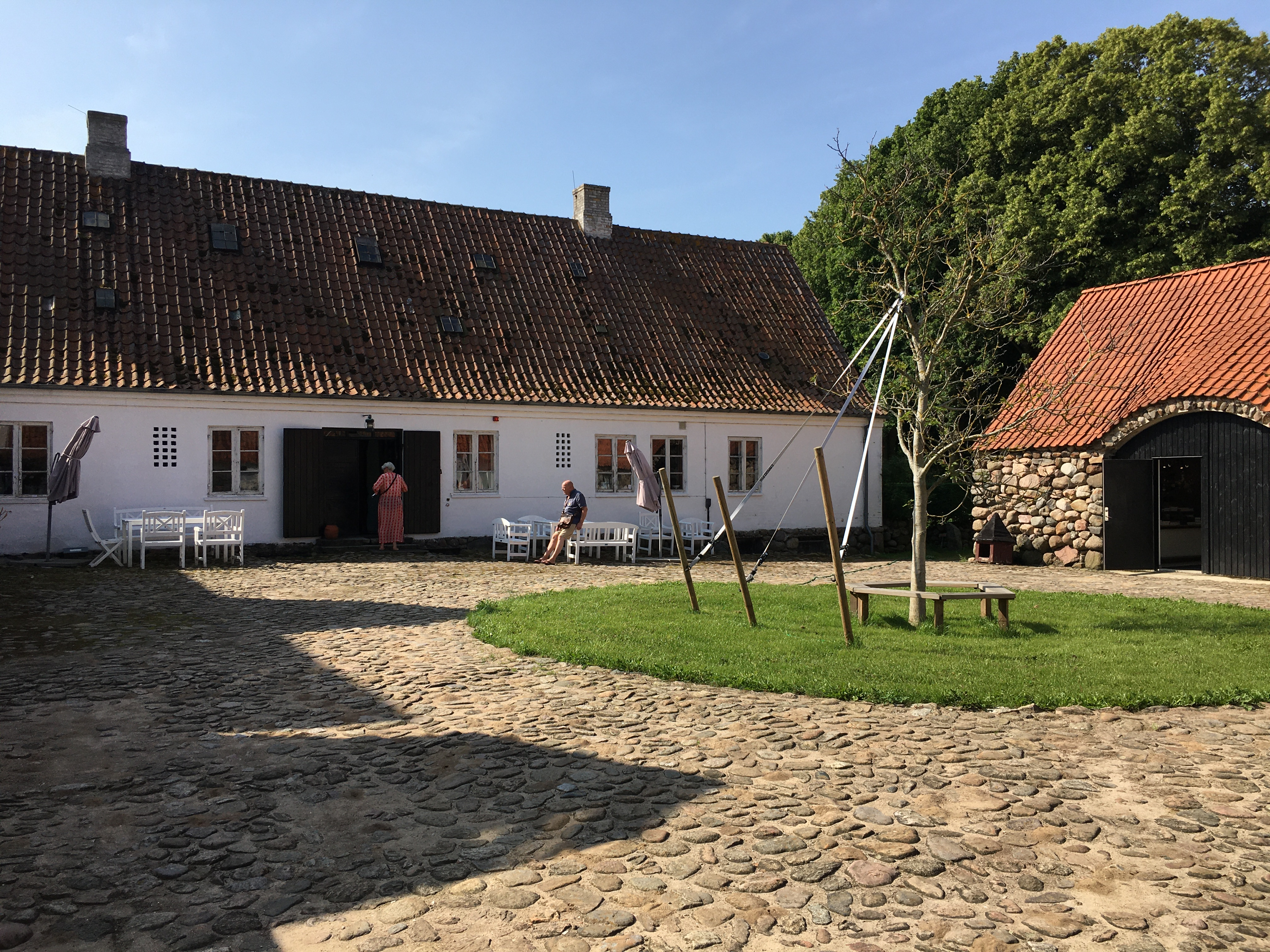

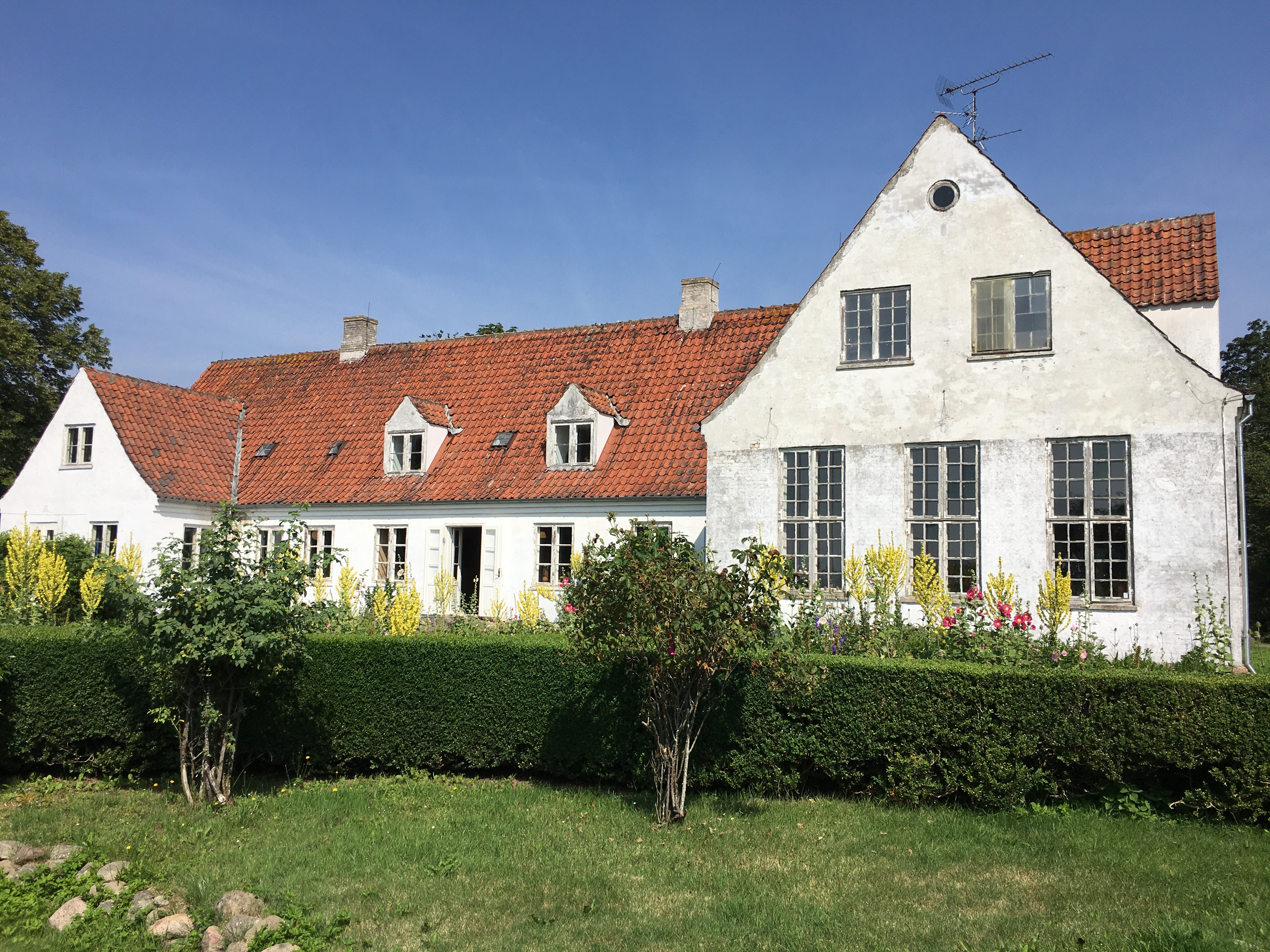

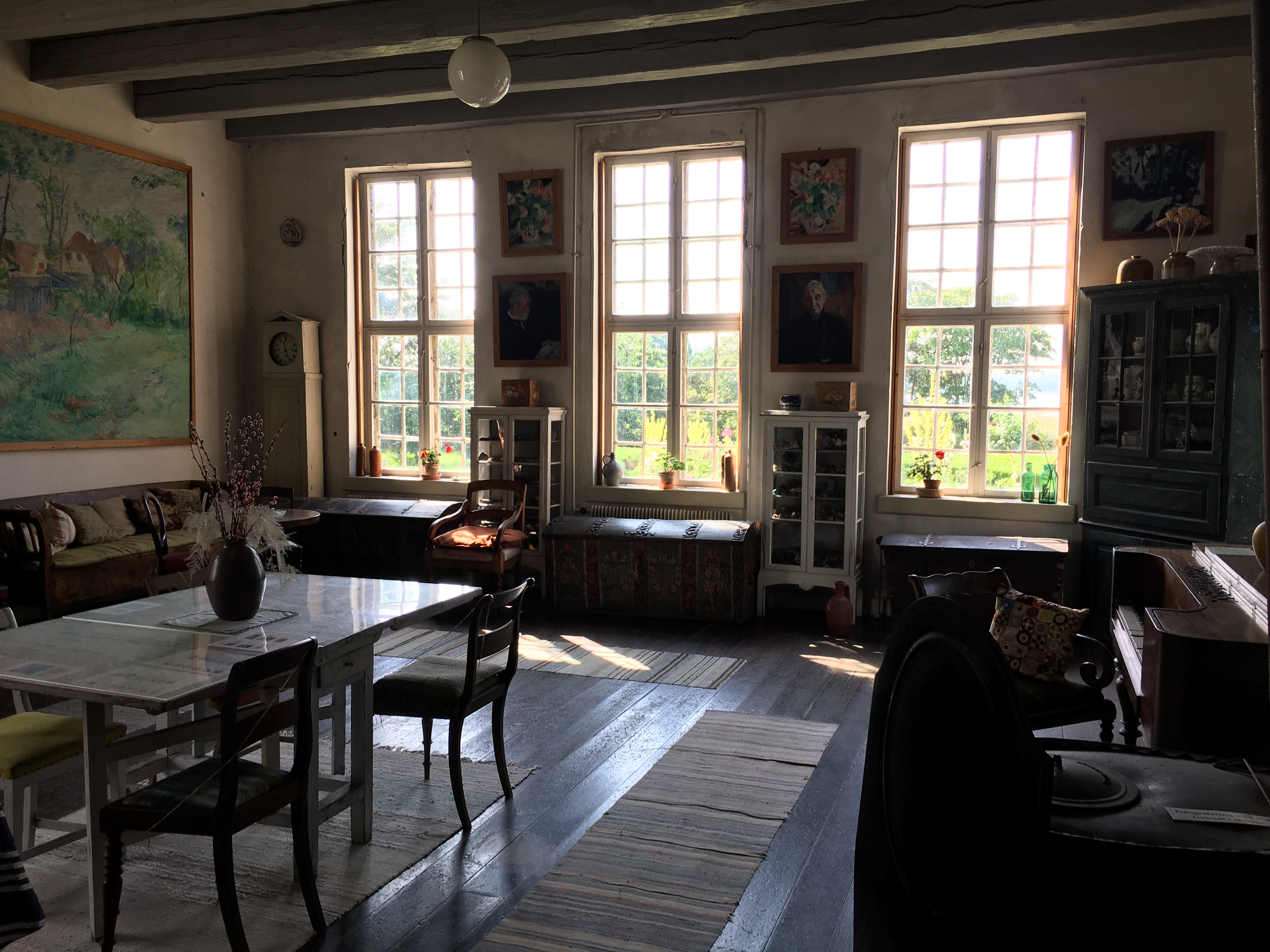

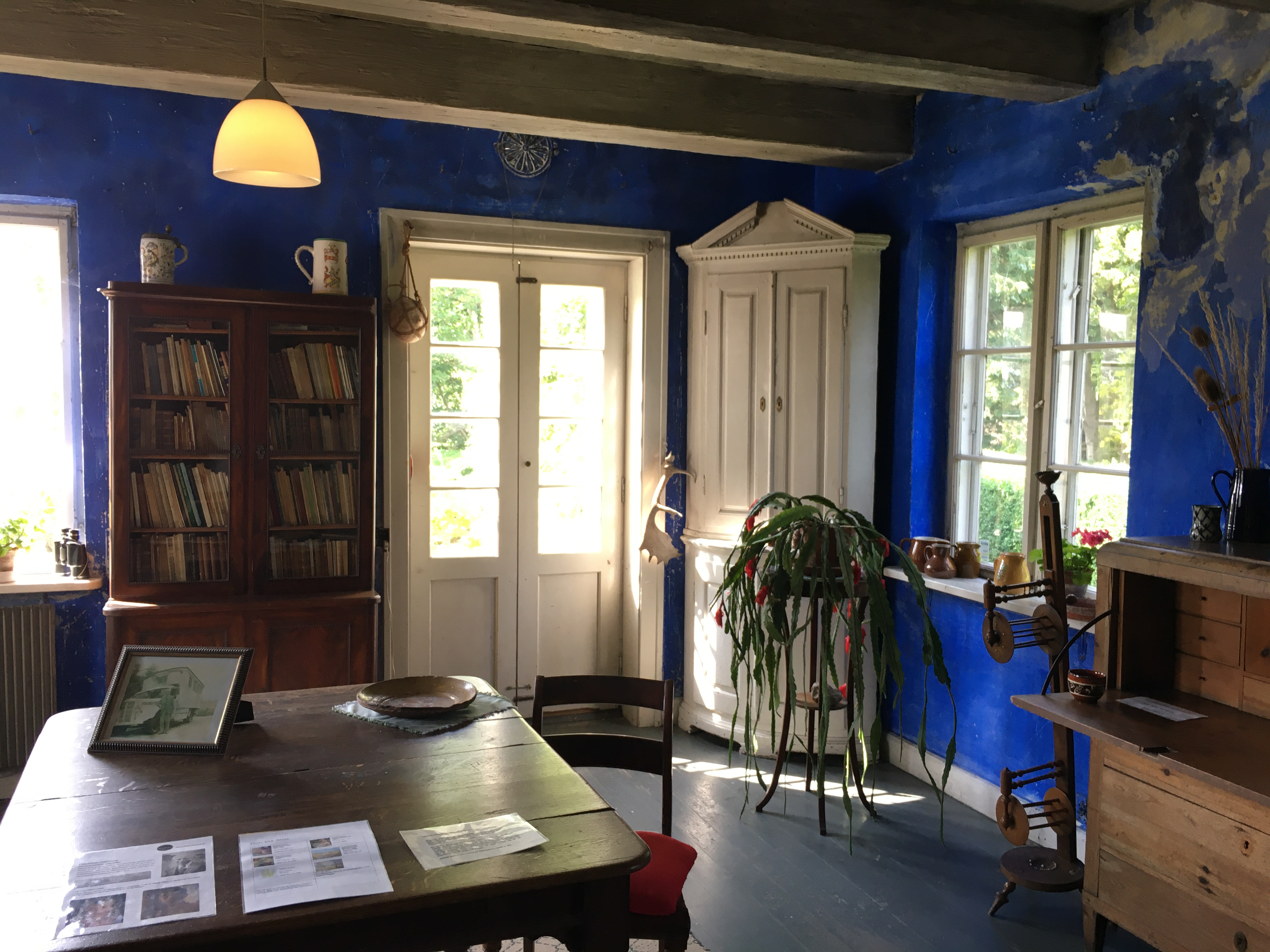

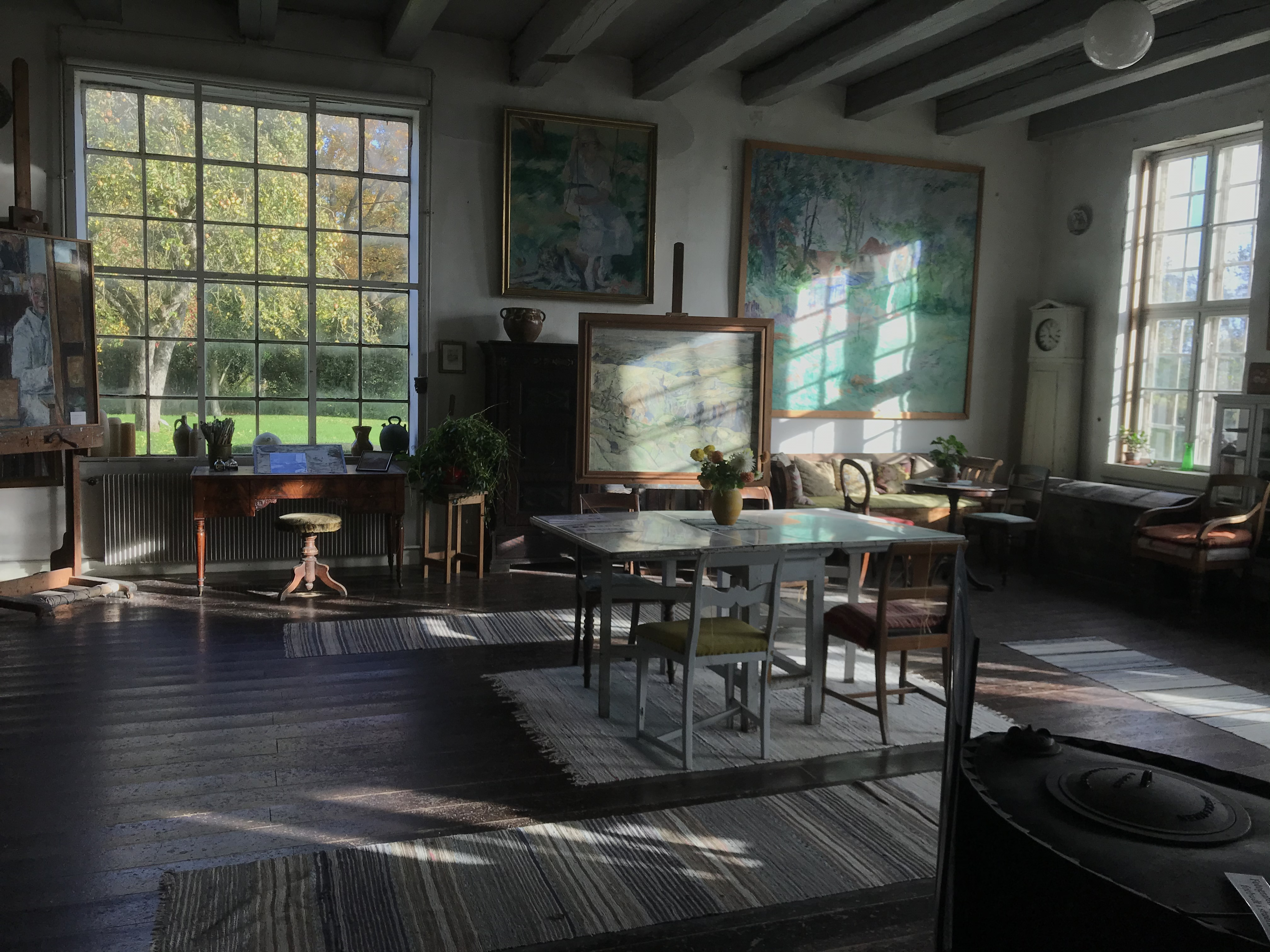
