= Stina Lykke Borg =

Danish footballer (born 1986)

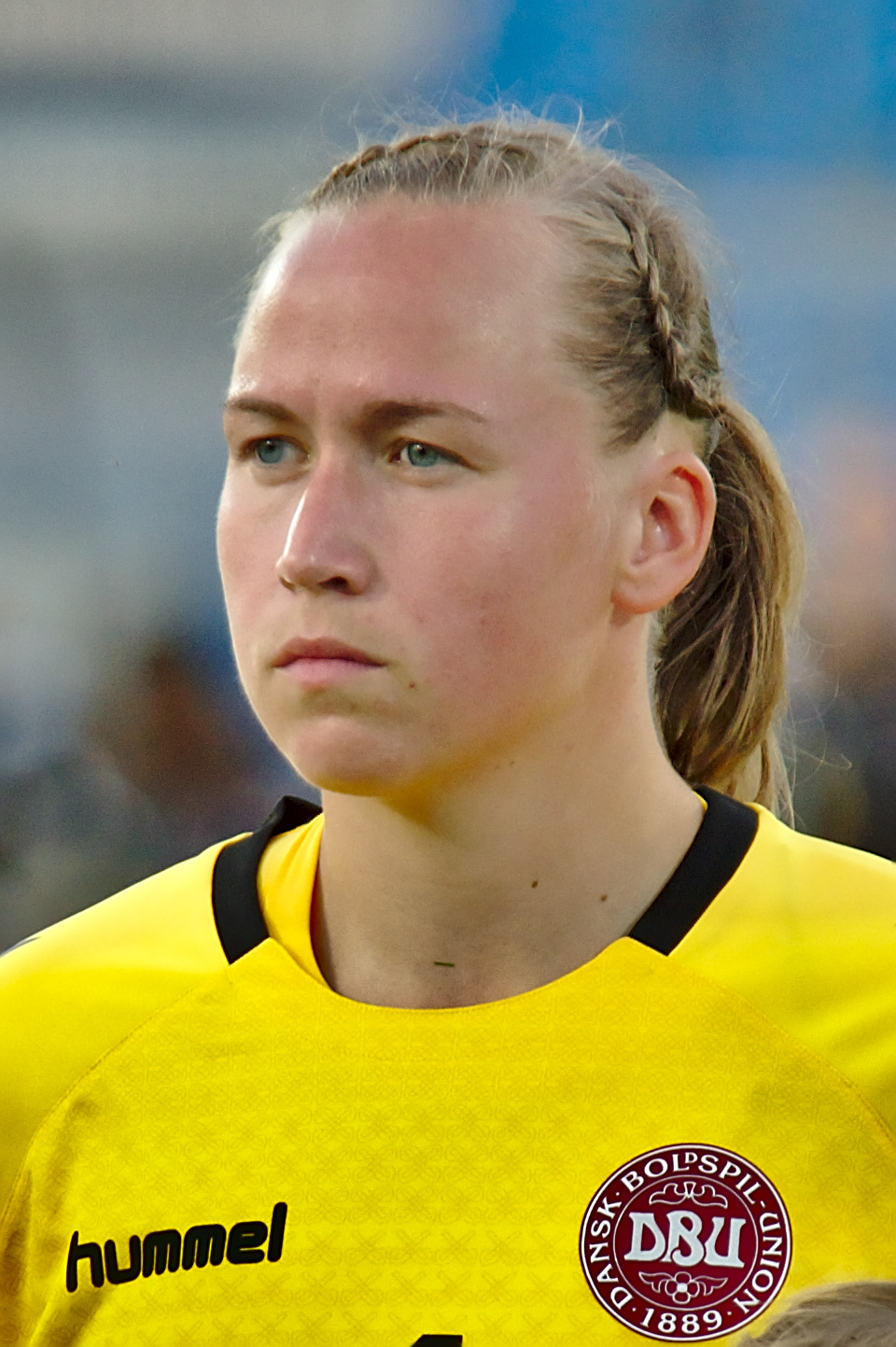

Personal information
- Full name: Stina Lykke Petersen Borg
- Date of birth: 9 February 1986 (age 40)
- Place of birth: Højby, Denmark
- Height: 1.74 m (5 ft 8 1/2 in)
- Position: Goalkeeper

Team information
- Current team: Kolding Q
- Number: 1

Youth career
- Lunde GIF

College career
Years	Team	Apps	(Gls)
2007	Rollins Tars		

Senior career*
Years	Team	Apps	(Gls)
–2006	Odense		
2009–2013	Brøndby IF		
2013	FCR 2001 Duisburg	4	(0)
2014	MSV Duisburg	7	(0)
2014–2015	1. FC Köln	11	(0)
2015–2016	Odense		
2016–2017	Kristianstads DFF	7	(0)
2017–2018	Kolding Q	24	(0)
2020–2021	HB Køge	2	(0)
2021–	Kolding Q	4	(0)

International career^{‡}
2011–2018	Denmark	83	(0)
Medal record
Women's football
Representing Denmark
UEFA Women's Championship
Silver medal – second place	2017 Netherlands	Team
- * Club domestic league appearances and goals as of 23:04, 13 December 2022 (UTC) ‡ National team caps and goals as of 23:04, 13 December 2022 (UTC)

Stina Lykke Petersen Borg (born 9 February 1986) is a Danish football goalkeeper who plays for Danish club KoldingQ and formerly the Denmark national team. She has played college soccer in America with the Rollins Tars, and played for professional clubs in Germany and Sweden, as well as in her native Denmark. She won 83 senior caps for Denmark between 2011 and 2018.

== Club career ==
Lykke Borg began playing football aged five in her hometown Højby. In 2007, she attended Rollins College in Florida and played NCAA college soccer.

Following a successful UEFA European Championship 2013 tournament with Denmark, Lykke Borg secured a transfer from Brøndby to FCR 2001 Duisburg. She had compiled three Elitedivisionen titles and four Danish Women's Cups in her time with Brøndby. In 2016 Lykke Borg transferred to Kristianstads DFF, after playing in Odense's first three matches of the Danish season.

Early in 2017 she moved back to Denmark in order to be closer to her family and friends. She chose to play for KoldingQ without a wage even though she had offers from clubs in other countries. During UEFA European Championship 2017 she told the media that she was a better goalkeeper when she was living close to her family and friends. She studied to be a physiotherapist and had to work beside playing football and studying. During the Euro 2017 the Danish football association paid her wage as she could not work during the tournament.

She stopped her professional career in 2018, but she went back in June 2020 after pregnancy, to play for HB Køge. In February 2021 she returned to KoldingQ in a new role as a "keeperkonsulent " (English: goalkeeper consultant). She made another playing comeback with the club in August 2021.

== International career ==
She was called into the Denmark squad for UEFA European Championship 2005 as an uncapped player. At the 2011 Algarve Cup she made her first senior national team appearance, in a 3–1 defeat by Sweden.

After a knee injury to regular goalkeeper Heidi Johansen, Lykke Borg was elevated to first choice for UEFA European Championship 2013. In Denmark's opening group match against hosts Sweden she saved two second half penalty kicks from Lotta Schelin and Kosovare Asllani, respectively, to secure a 1–1 draw.

Denmark progressed to the quarter-finals on the drawing of lots, where they shocked France in a penalty shoot-out after a 1–1 draw. Lykke Borg stopped Louisa Nécib's kick in the shoot-out, after narrowly failing to keep out the same player's penalty goal during the match. Denmark's run came to an end in the semi-final when they lost another penalty shoot-out to Norway.

Lykke Borg remained the first choice goalkeeper at UEFA European Championship 2017, and saved a penalty from Caroline Graham Hansen in Denmark's 1–0 group stage win over Norway. She also saved twice in the penalty shoot-out win over Austria in the semi-final. Lykke Borg started in the UEFA European Championship 2017 final, which Denmark lost 4–2 to hosts the Netherlands.

In June 2018, Lykke Borg retired from international football following a 5–1 2019 FIFA World Cup qualification – UEFA Group 4 win over Hungary in Viborg.
