= Nyt Odsherred =

Nyt Odsherred Nyt Odsherred
- Leader: Karina Vincentz
- Founded: 2021
- Split from: Venstre; Odsherred Listen
- Headquarters: Odsherred
- Ideology: Centre to Centre-right
- Colors: Teal; Dark Red
- Municipal councils: 4 / 2,436
- Mayors: 1 / 98

Nyt Odsherred is a Danish local political party from Odsherred Municipality.

== History ==
In 2021, Karina Vincentz, who previously attempted to be the top candidate for Venstre in the municipal elections, decided to create the party.

In the election, the same year, the party would become the third largest, and win 4 seats. Eventually, the party reached an agreement with the Danish Social Liberal Party, the Conservatives, the New Right, Danish People's Party and Venstre, which would see Karina Vincentz become the mayor.

== Election results ==
=== Municipal elections (Note: Of Odsherred seats) ===
Date	Votes		Seats	±
Date	#	%	Seats	±
2021	2,348	12.7	4 / 25	
