= Sigurd Swane =

Danish painter

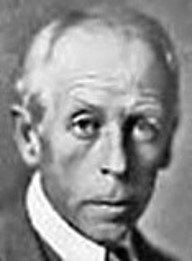
Sigurd Swane (1940s)

Sigurd Swane (16 June 1879 – 9 April 1973) was a Danish Post-Impressionist painter and poet; known primarily for his landscapes. His former home Malergården in Odsherred was converted into a historic house museum in 2004.

== Biography ==
Swane was born in Frederiksberg. He studied in Copenhagen at the Royal Danish Academy of Art from 1899 until 1903. That year, he made his official debut at the Charlottenborg Spring Exhibition.

While in Paris in 1907, he was influenced by Fauvism. On returning to Denmark, he painted a series of woodlands using greens, yellows and blues. His use of pointillistic spots was soon replaced by more solid brushstrokes, with careful separation of colour, making him one of Denmark's foremost colourists. He also did portraits, still lifes and some religious scenes, including many painted versions of "The Dream of Jacob". His portraits are typified by wooded backgrounds.

In 1912 he published one of his best known collections of poems, Skyer (Clouds). Three years later, he was among the organizers of the Grønningen artists' group. His work was part of the painting event in the art competition at the 1924 Summer Olympics.

After 1934, he fulfilled his childhood dream of living in the country on a farm in Odsherred in the north-west of Zealand, where he completed a series of light-filled landscape paintings. From 1947 he often painted in Spain and Portugal. When travelling in Southern Europe, the family would use a converted truck as a living space.

Sigurd Swane died, aged 93, at his farmhouse, named Malergården, in the hamlet of Plejerup, not far from Grevinge in Zealand. Malergården was also a residence for other Swane family members engaged in the arts including his brother Leo (1887-1968), who was an art historian. In 2004 the idyllic house and grounds were established as a museum, being a branch of the Odsherreds Kunstmuseum.

His first wife Christine Swane (1876–1960) to whom he was married from 1910 to 1920, was also a painter. In 1921, he married his second wife Agnete Swane (1893 - 1994), likewise a painter but also with an interest in architecture. She designed the Malergården house in 1934. His son Lars Swane (1913-2002) and daughters Gerda Swane (1930-2004) and Hanne Swane (1926-1986) were also painters. A second son, Henrik Swane (1929-2011), became a popular photographer.

== See also ==
- Odsherred Painters

== Other sources ==
- Sigurd Swane Den Store Danske
- Sigurd Swane biographical notes Weilbachs Kunstnerleksikon
