= List of churches in Fredensborg Municipality =

This list of churches in Fredensborg Municipality lists church buildings in Fredensborg Municipality, Denmark.

== List ==
Name	Location	Year	Coordinates	Image	Refs
Asminderød Church	Fredensborg	12th century	55°59′6.5″N 12°24′30.3″E		
Egebjerg Church	Kokkedal	1990	55°54′18″N 12°29′18.24″E		
Fredensborg Palace Chapel	Fredensborg	1726	55°58′57.4″N 12°23′48.3″E		The church is seen to the far left
Grønholt Church	Grønholt	c. 1100	55°56′44.87″N 12°23′6.71″E		
Humlebæk Church	Humlebæk	1868	55°58′18.11″N 12°32′31.55″E		
Karlebo Church	Karlebo	c. 1170	55°47′54.3″N 11°33′15.3″E		
Nivå Church	Nivå	1910	55°55′28.96″N 12°29′30.08″E		

== See also ==
- List of churches in Vordingborg Municipality
- List of churches in Faxe Municipality
- List of churches in Holbæk Municipality
