= List of churches in Holbæk Municipality =

1: Hjembæk-Svinninge 2: Kundby 3: Gislinge 4: Hagested 5: Hørby 6: Udby 7: Orø 8: Butterup-Tuse 9: Søstrup 10: Tveje Merløse 11: Sankt Nicolai 12: Vipperød 13: Jyderup 14: Stigs Bjergby 15: Mørkøv 16: Nørre Jernløse 17: Holmstrup 18: Skamstrup-Frydendal 19: Sønder Jernløse 20: Kvanløse 21: Søndersted 22: Undløse 23: Ugerløse 24: Tølløse 25: Soderup 26: Store Tåstrup 27: Kirke Eskilstrup

This list of churches in Holbæk Municipality lists church buildings in Holbæk Municipality, located in the west-central of the island of Zealand, Denmark.

== Overview ==
Holbæk Municipality belongs to the Diocese of Roskilde, a diocese within the Evangelical Lutheran Church of Denmark. It is divided into 27 parishes.

== List ==
Name	Location	Year	Coordinates	Image	Refs
Ågerup Church	Ågerup	12th century	55°39′47.9″N 11°45′47.7″E		
Butterup Church	Butterup	12th century	55°42′1.74″N 11°37′17.29″E		
Frydendal Church	Fårevejle				
Gislinge Church	Gislinge	c. 1100			
Grandløse Church	Grandløse	c. 1150	55°41′21.02″N 11°43′46.25″E		
Hagested Church	Hagested				
Hjembæk Church	Lumsås				
Holmstrup Church	Holmstrup				
Hørby Church	Hørby				
Jyderup Church	Jyderup				
Kirke Eskilstrup Church	Kirke Eskilstrup				
Knudby Church	Knudby				
Kvanløse Church	Kvanløse				
Mørkøv Church	Mørkøv	12th century	55°39′47.9″N 11°45′47.7″E		
Mørkøv Kirkeby Church					
Nørre Jernløse Kirke	Nørre Jernløse				
Orø Church	Orø	13th century	55°45′29″N 11°48′28″E		
St. Nicolas' Church	Holbæk	1872	55°42′58.67″N 11°42′48.95″E		
St Stephen' Church	Andelslandsbyen Nyvang				
Skamstrup Church	Stenstrup				
Soderup Church	Soderup		55°36′21.72″N 11°47′59.13″E		
Stigs Bjergby Church	Stigs Bjergby				
Store Tåstrup Church	Store Tåstrup				
Svinninge Church	Svinninge	12th century	55°42′14.51″N 11°27′37.13″E		
Sønder Asmindrup Church	Sønder Asmindrup				
Sønder Jernløse Church	Sønder Jernløse				
Søndersted Church	Søstrup				
Søstrup Church	Holbæk				
Tuse Church	Tuse				
Tveje Merløse Kirke	Tveje Merløse		55°41′33.7″N 11°41′55.1″E		
Tølløse Church	Tølløse	c. 1100	55°36′53.11″N 11°44′43.12″E		
Udby Church	Udby	c. 1100	55°45′20.16″N 11°42′30.96″E		
Ugerløse Church	Ugerløse	1876	55°35′8.64″N 11°39′15.17″E		
Undløse Church	Undløse	1872	55°36′21.39″N 11°34′56.37″E		

== See also ==
- Listed buildings in Holbæk Municipality
