= Højby Church =

Coordinates: 55.9127°N 11.5997°E

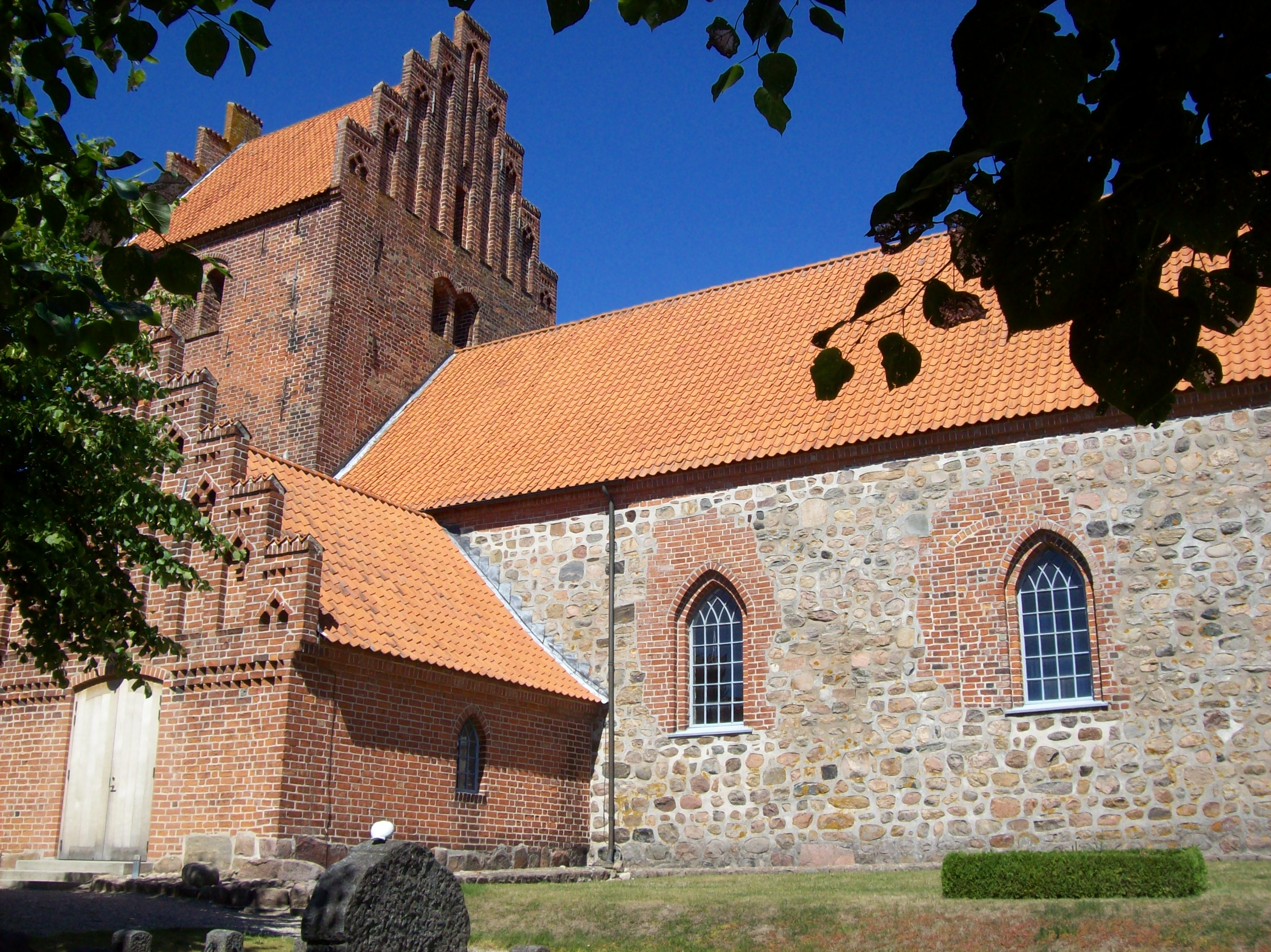
- Højby Church
- Location: Højby, Odsherred
- Country: Denmark
- Denomination: Church of Denmark
- Website: www.hoejby-sj-kirke.dk

History
- Founded: 12th century

Administration
- Diocese: Diocese of Roskilde
- Deanery: Odsherred Provsti
- Parish: Højby Sogn

Højby Church is located in the village of Højby in Odsherred, northwestern Zealand, Denmark. Dating back to the beginning of the 12th century, it is constructed in granite. Several modifications have taken place since the original construction including a porch in the 13th century, Gothic cross-vaulting in the nave and chancel in the 14th century, a tower around the year 1400 as well as a vestry, a chapel and a new entrance porch towards the end of the Middle Ages.

== Wall paintings ==
The church is recognized for its fine wall paintings or kalkmalerier which are considered to be among the best in the country from the late Gothic period. They were probably created at the beginning of the 15th century, shortly after the cross vaults were added. They were discovered in 1901 and have been restored on several occasions. During the last restoration in 2007, the painting of Erasmus' martyrdom was revealed for the first time.

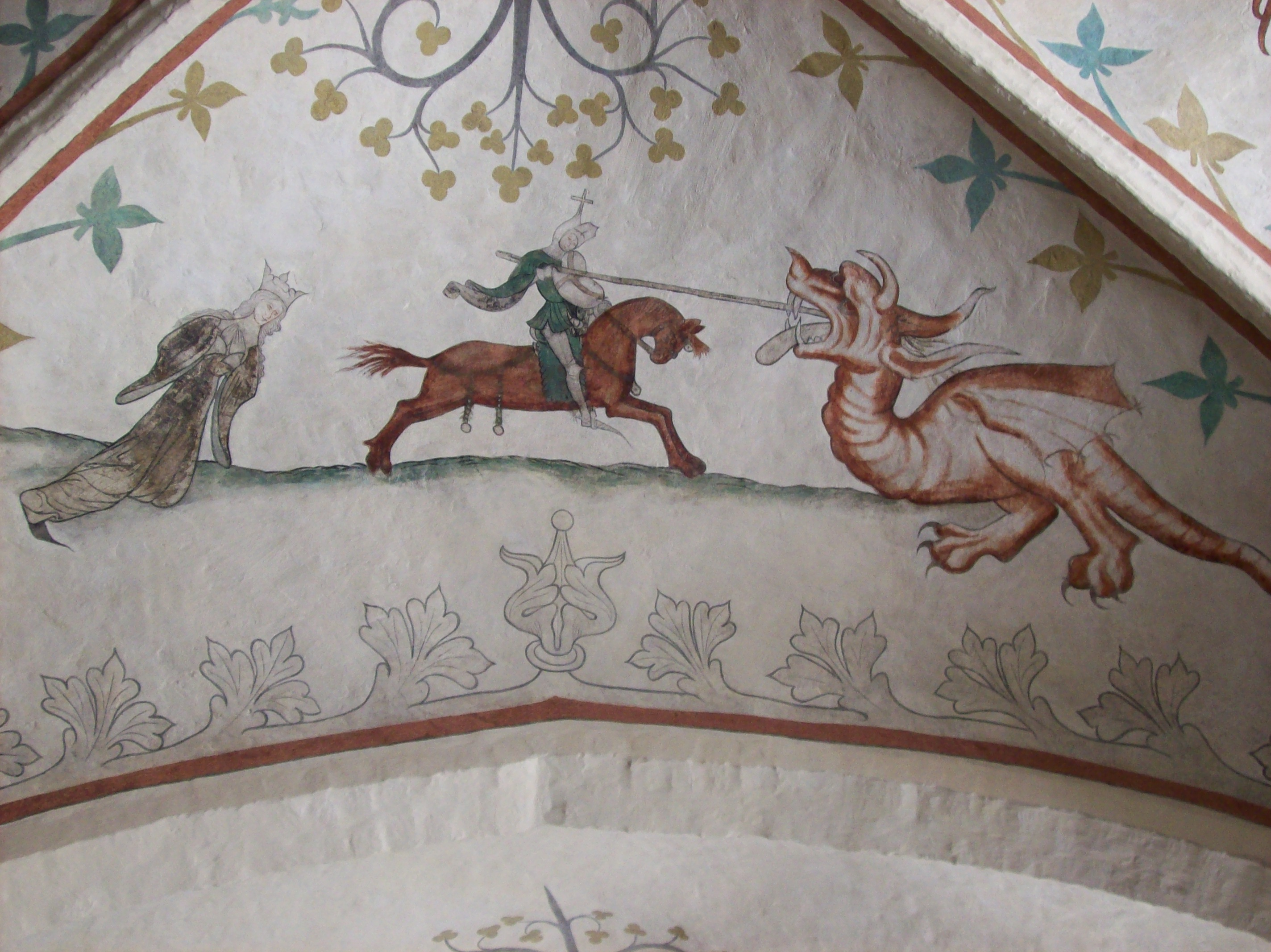
George and the dragon

The paintings in the chancel tell the story of the Day of Judgment with images of Christ, a bassoon-playing archangel and St Michael. The lost souls are shown going to hell with the devil standing in its flames.

There is also a painting of St George and the dragon including the Syrian princess he saved from the dragon.

== See also ==
- List of churches in Odsherred Municipality
