= Egebjerg, Odsherred Municipality =

City in northwest Zealand, Denmark

Egebjerg
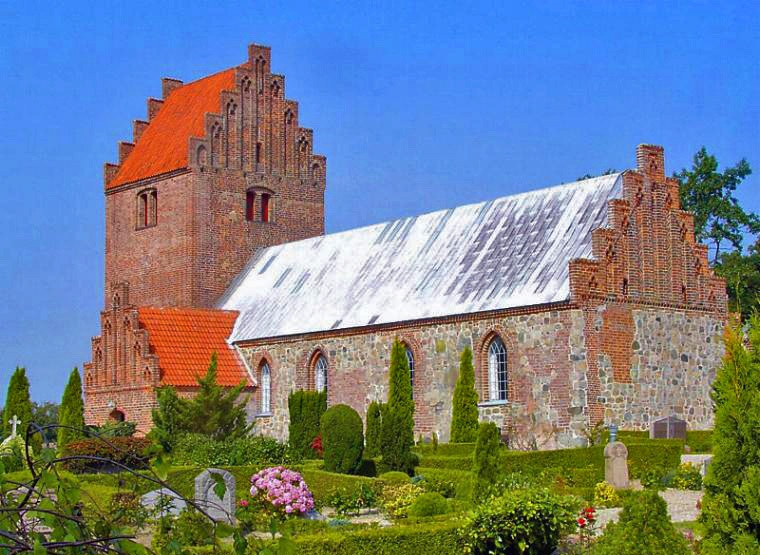
- Photo of the Egebjerg Church
- Interactive map of Egebjerg

Geography
- Location: Egebjerg Parish, Odsherred Municipality, Region Zealand, Denmark
- Coordinates: 55°50′38″N 11°40′41″E
- Area: 0.6 km^{2} (0.23 sq mi)

Demographics
- Population: 417 (2026)

Additional information
- Time zone: UTC +1
- Official website: http://www.egebjergonline.com/

Egebjerg is a village in Northwest Zealand with a population of 417 (1 January 2026). Egebjerg is located in Odsherred under Egebjerg Parish, nine kilometers south of Nykøbing Sjælland and 25 kilometers north of Holbæk. The village belongs to Odsherred Municipality and is located in the Region Zealand.

The village has its own community center, sports association, local heating system, and a school. A village guild has been formed, which is responsible for events such as urban beautification, shared kitchen gardens, tourism, etc. In addition, a group of citizens has ensured that since 2015, an annual concert has been held with Rasmus Nøhr at the helm.

A local newspaper, called Egebladet, is digitally published in the village.

The eco-community Fri og Fro (Under the Sky) is located in the western part of the village at the end of Vesterleddet, where you can see straw houses and other sustainable solutions. Fri og Fro handles its waste water in the form of a closed pile evaporation plant.
