= Hørve =

- Town
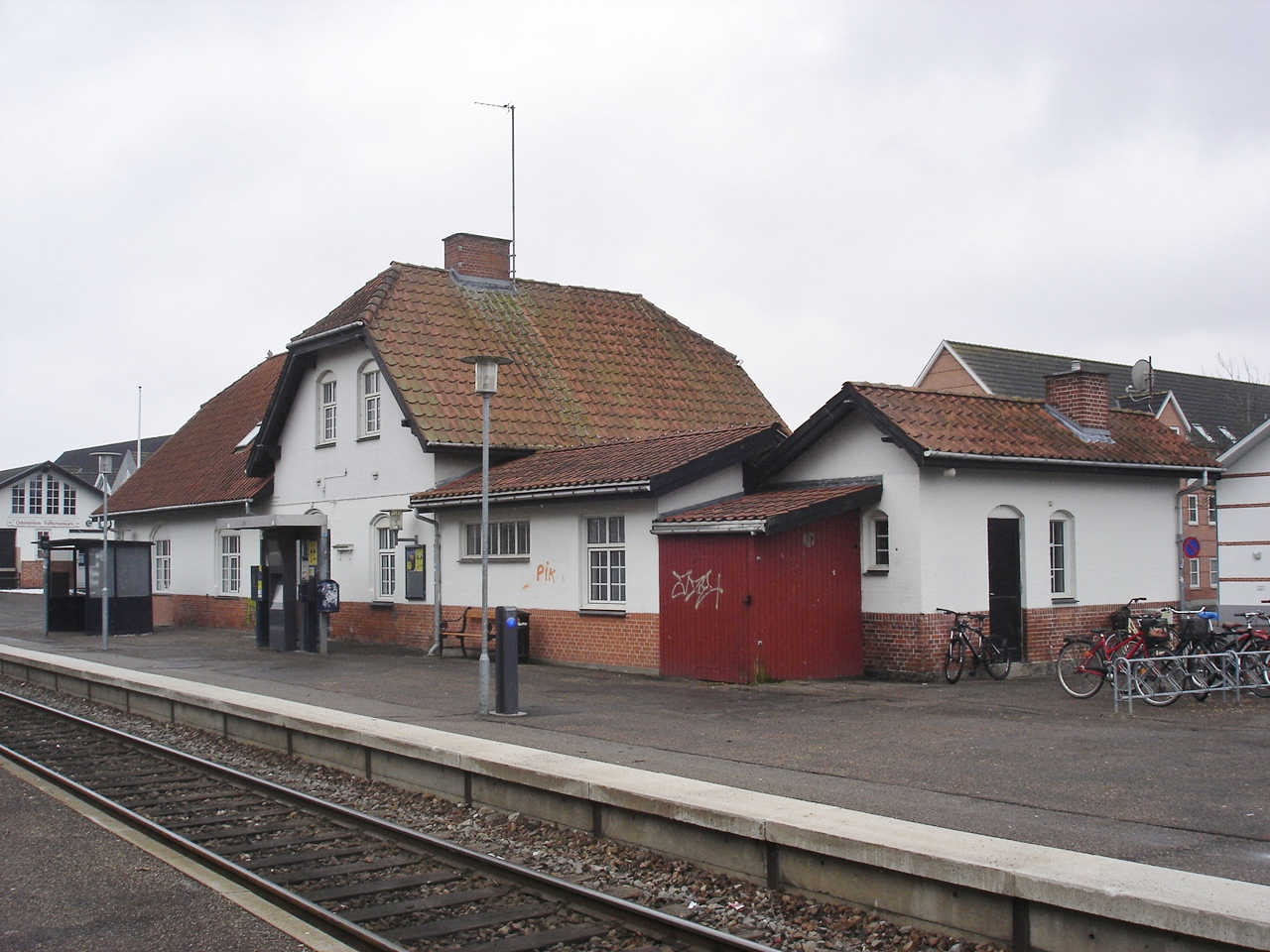
- Hørve railway station

- Location in Denmark Hørve (Denmark Region Zealand)
- Coordinates: 55°45′1″N 11°26′52″E
- Country: Denmark
- Region: Region Zealand
- Municipality: Odsherred Municipality
- Parishes: Hørve Parish and Vallekilde Parish

Area
  - Urban: 1.5 km^{2} (0.58 sq mi)

Population (2026)
  - Urban: 2,405
  - Urban density: 1,600/km^{2} (4,200/sq mi)
- Time zone: UTC+1 (CET)
  - Summer (DST): UTC+2 (CEST)
- Postal Code: DK-4534 Hørve

Hørve is a railway town in the southern part of Odsherred Municipality, Region Zealand in Denmark. The town is located 22 km west of Holbæk, 30 km northeast of Kalundborg, 4 km north of Svinninge and 25 km southwest of the municipal seat Højby. It has almost merged with the southwestern neighbouring village of Vallekilde. Together they form a small urban area, with a population of 2,405 (1 January 2026).

Hørve is served by Hørve railway station on the Odsherred Line.

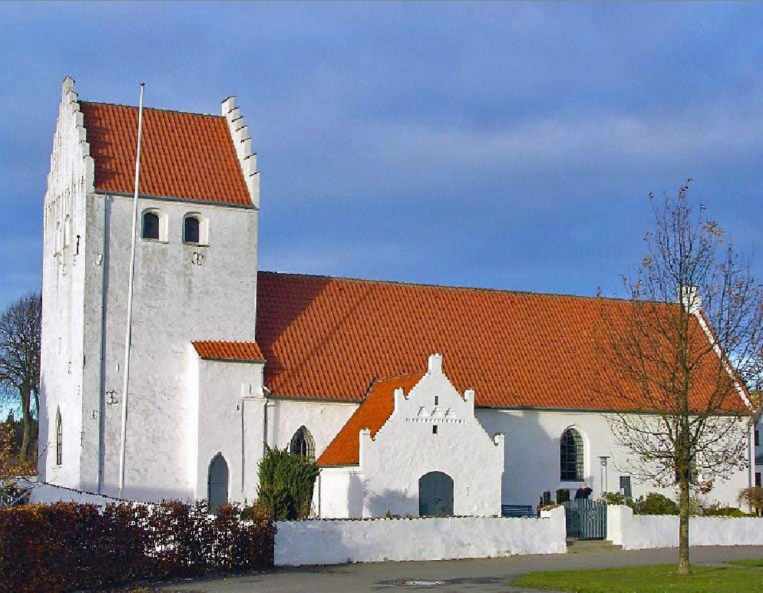
Hørve Church

Hørve Kirke (Hørve Church) is located in the northern part of the town. It is built approx. 1100 and is one of the few churches with well-preserved Medieval-style frescos from the Post-Reformation period, dated to 1564.

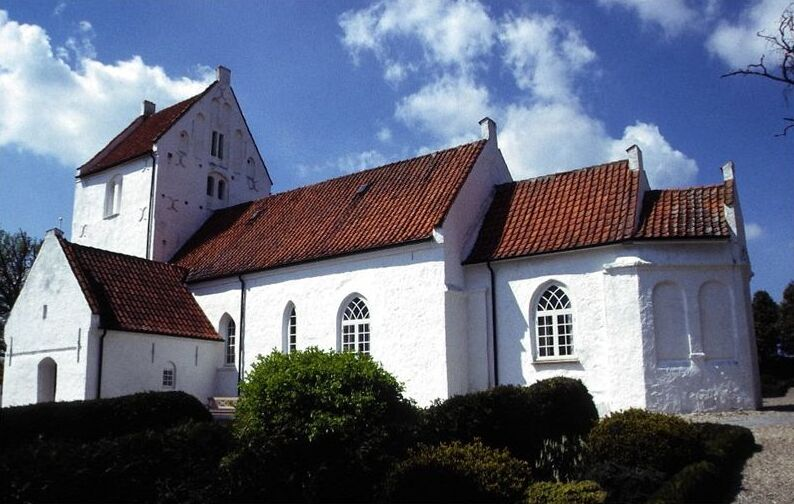
Vallekilde Church

Vallekilde Kirke (Vallekilde Church) and Vallekilde Folk High School are located in the village of Vallekilde.
