= Grevinge =

- Railway town
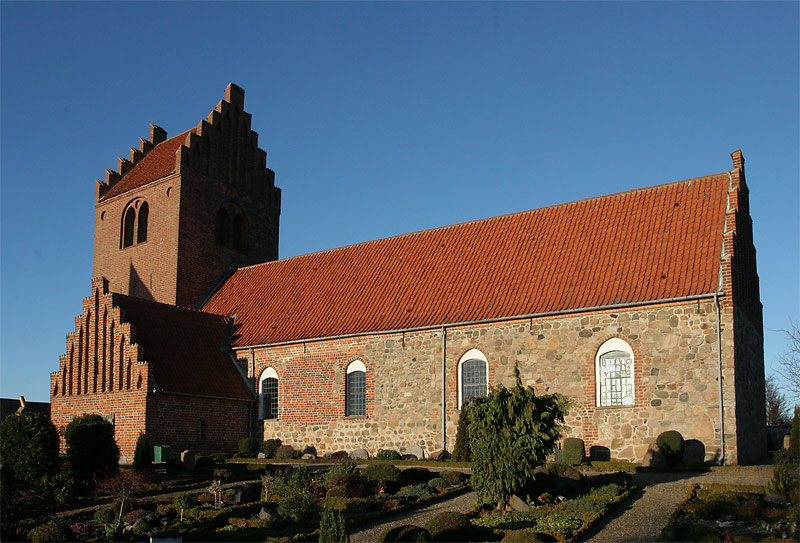
- Grevinge Church

- Location in Region Zealand Grevinge (Denmark)
- Coordinates: 55°48′0″N 11°33′6″E
- Country: Denmark
- Region: Region Zealand
- Municipality: Odsherred Municipality

Population (2026)
  - Urban: 567
- Time zone: UTC+1 (CET)
  - Summer (DST): UTC+2 (CEST)
- Postal_code: DK-4571 Grevinge

Grevinge is a small railway town in Odsherred Municipality on the island of Zealand, Denmark. It is located c. 20 kilometres (12 mi) northwest of the town of Holbæk. As of 1 January 2026, Grevinge has a population of 567.

The romanesque Grevinge Church is located in the town. The Danish Post-Impressionist painter and poet Sigurd Swane, one of the Odsherred Painters, lived for many years in the farm house Malergården in the hamlet of Plejerup, not far from Grevinge. In 2004 the house and grounds were established as a museum.

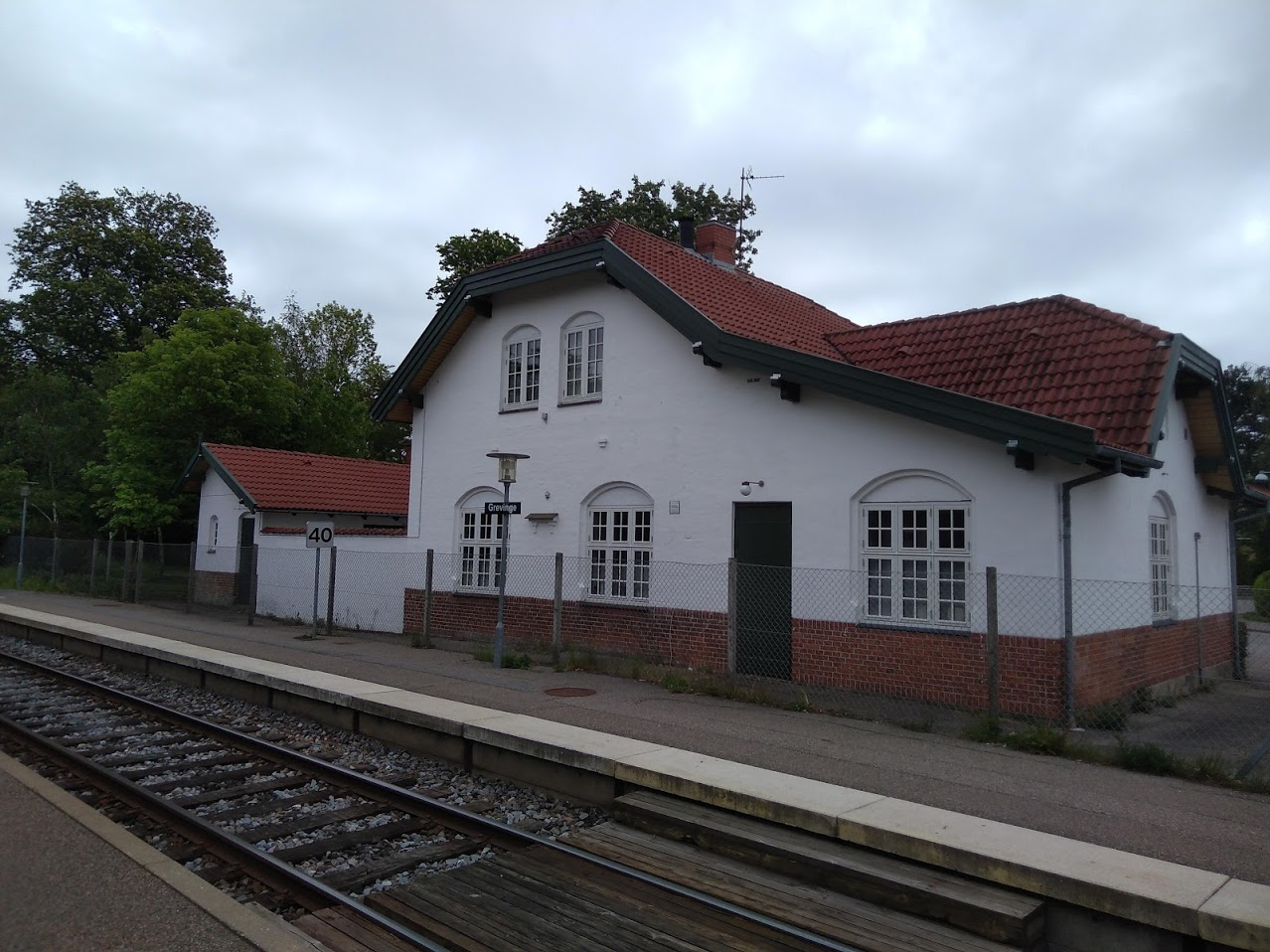
Grevinge railway station in 2019.

Grevinge is served by Grevinge railway station on the Odsherred railway line.
