= Højby =

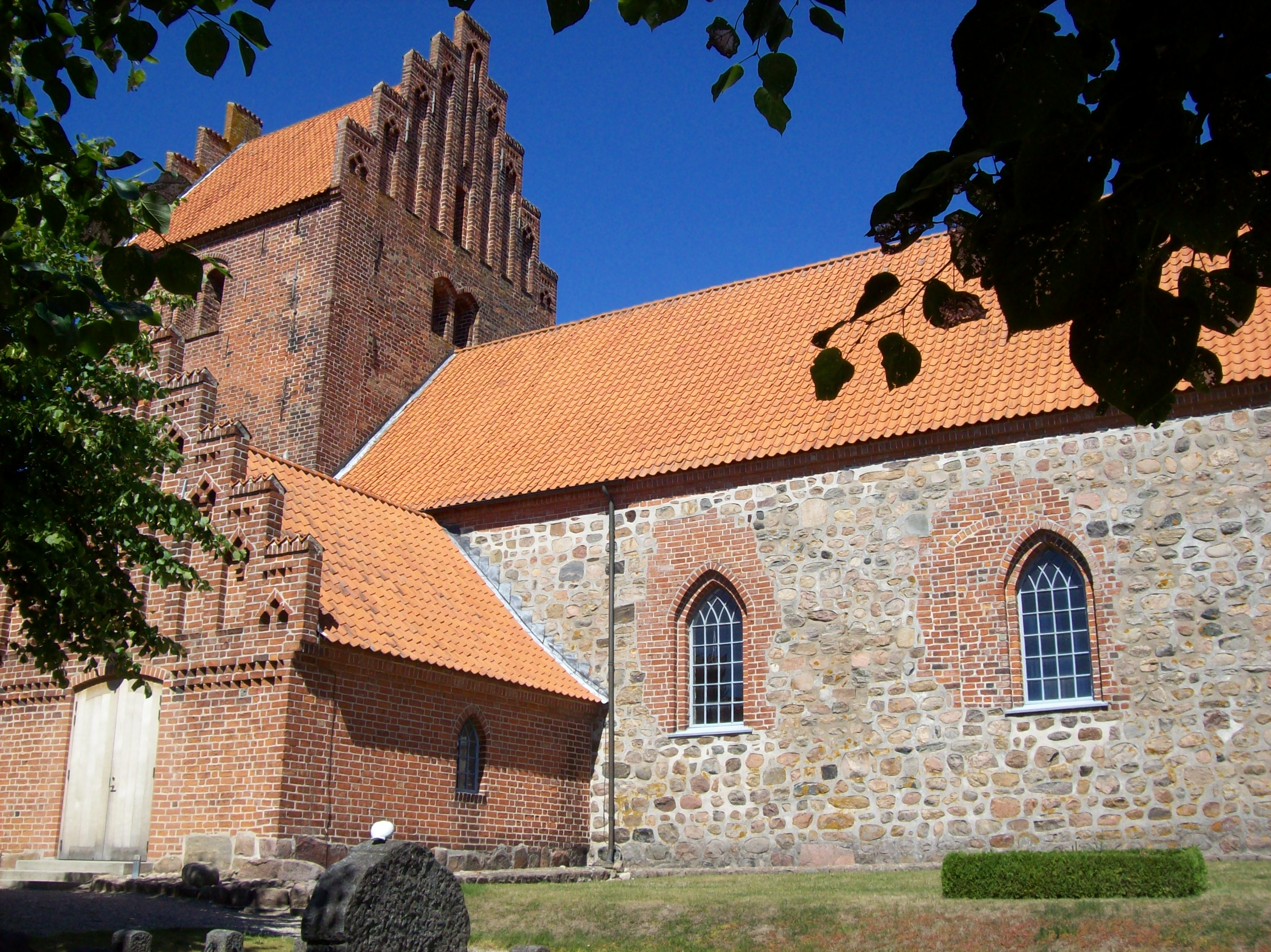
- Højby Church

- Location in Denmark Højby (Denmark Region Zealand)
- Coordinates: 55.91121°N 11.59603°E
- Country: Denmark
- Region: Zealand (Sjælland)
- Municipality: Odsherred

Government
  - Mayor: Finn Madsen

Area
  - Urban: 1.14 km^{2} (0.44 sq mi)

Population (2026)
  - Urban: 1,400
  - Urban density: 1,200/km^{2} (3,200/sq mi)
- Time zone: UTC+1 (Central Europe Time)
  - Summer (DST): UTC+2

Højby is a Danish town, seat of the Odsherred Municipality, in the Region Sjælland. Its population on 1 January 2026 was 1,400.

== Geography ==
Højby is located in the north-central side of the Zealand island.

== Notable people ==
- Nielsine Petersen (1851 in Nyrup – 1916) a Danish sculptor
- Ib Nielsen (1919 in Højby – 1994) a Danish fencer, competed at the 1948 and 1952 Summer Olympics
- Gerhardt Sørensen (1921 in Højby – 2002), Olympic rower, competed at the London 1948 Summer Olympics
- Mark Haastrup (born 1984 in Højby) is a Danish professional golfer
- Stina Lykke Petersen (born 1986 in Højby) a Danish football goalkeeper who plays for Danish club Kolding Q and the Denmark women's national football team

== See also ==
- Højby Church
- Højby Sjælland railway station
