= Fårevejle Kirkeby =

Fårevejle
- Village
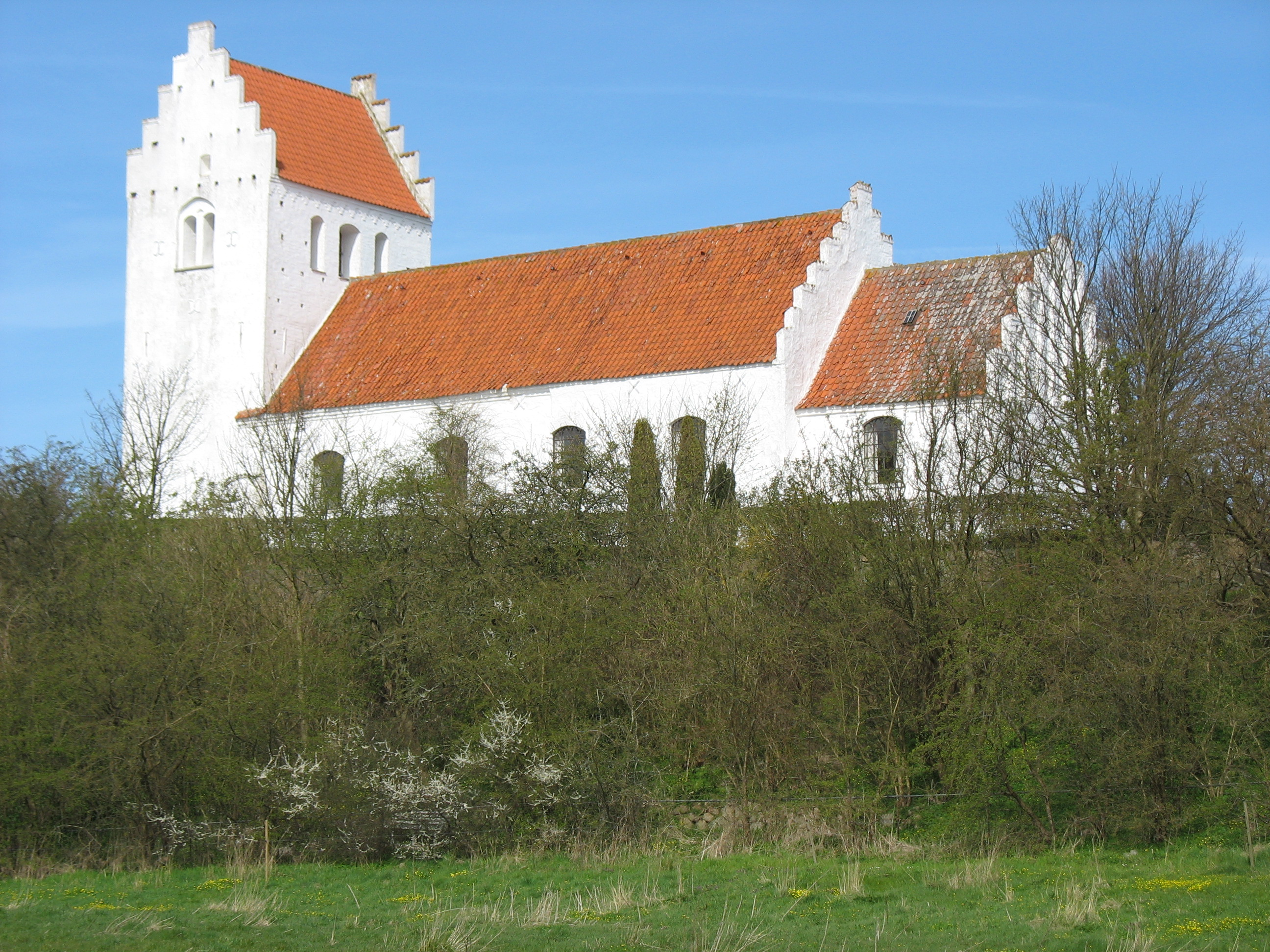
- Fårevejle Church

- Location in Region Zealand Fårevejle (Denmark)
- Coordinates: 55°48′10″N 11°26′29″E
- Country: Denmark
- Region: Region Zealand
- Municipality: Odsherred Municipality

Population (2026)
  - Urban: 700
- Time zone: UTC+1 (CET)
  - Summer (DST): UTC+2 (CEST)
- Postal code: DK-4540 Fårevejle

Fårevejle Kirkeby or just Fårevejle is a village in the Odsherred peninsula in the northwestern part of the island of Zealand, Denmark. As of 1 January 2026, Fårevejle has a population of 700. Fårevejle is located in Fårevejle Parish in Odsherred Municipality in Region Zealand.

Fårevejle Church is located in the village. James Hepburn, 4th Earl of Bothwell is buried in a vault at the church.

Fårevejle railway station is located in the neighbouring railway town of Fårevejle Stationsby, c. 3.5 km (2.2 mi) to the southeast of Fårevejle.

== Gallery ==
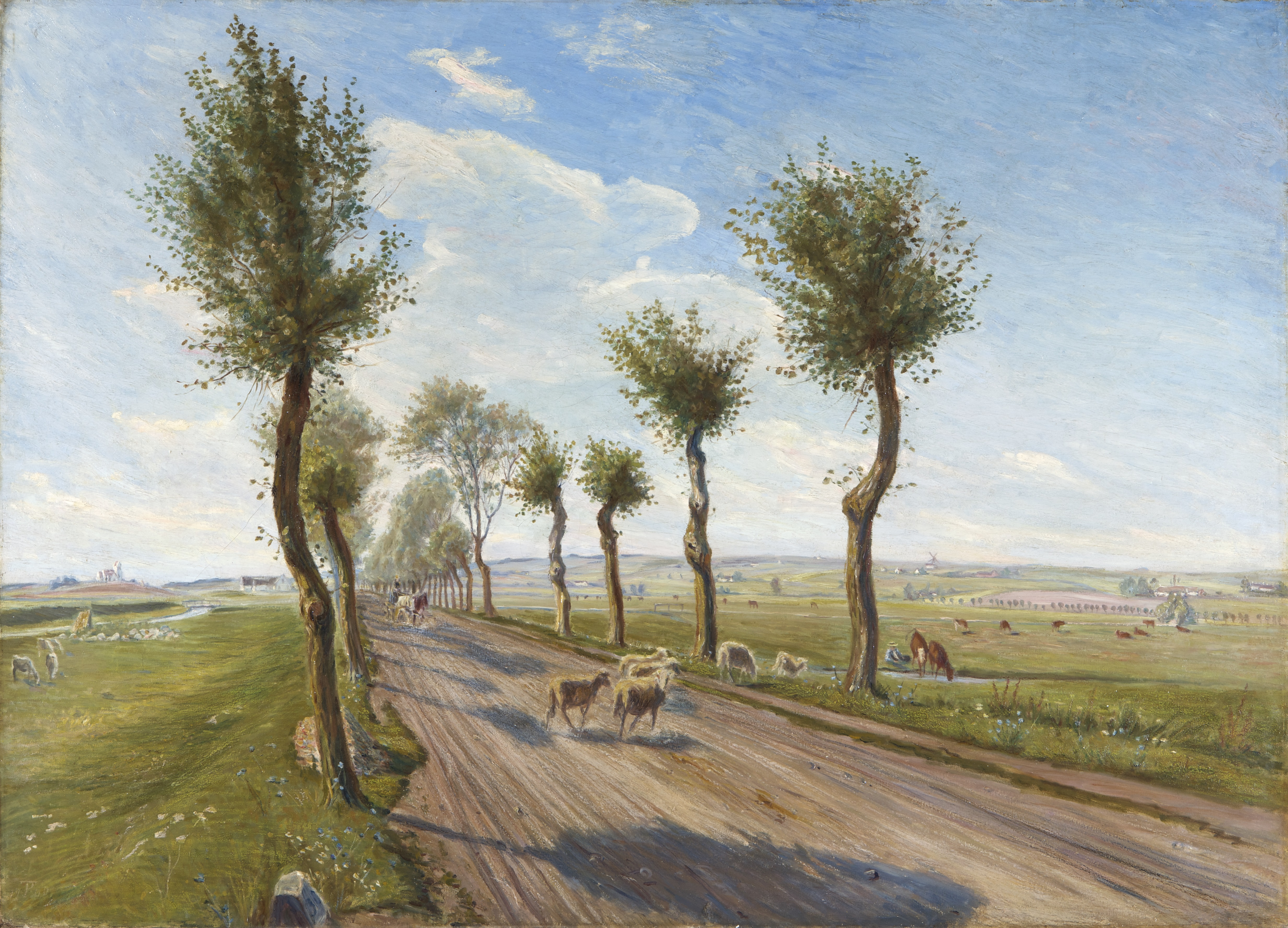
Road at Fårevejle. Painting by Theodor Philipsen, 1900
