= Odsherred Municipality =

Odsherred Municipality Odsherred Kommune (Danish)
- Municipality
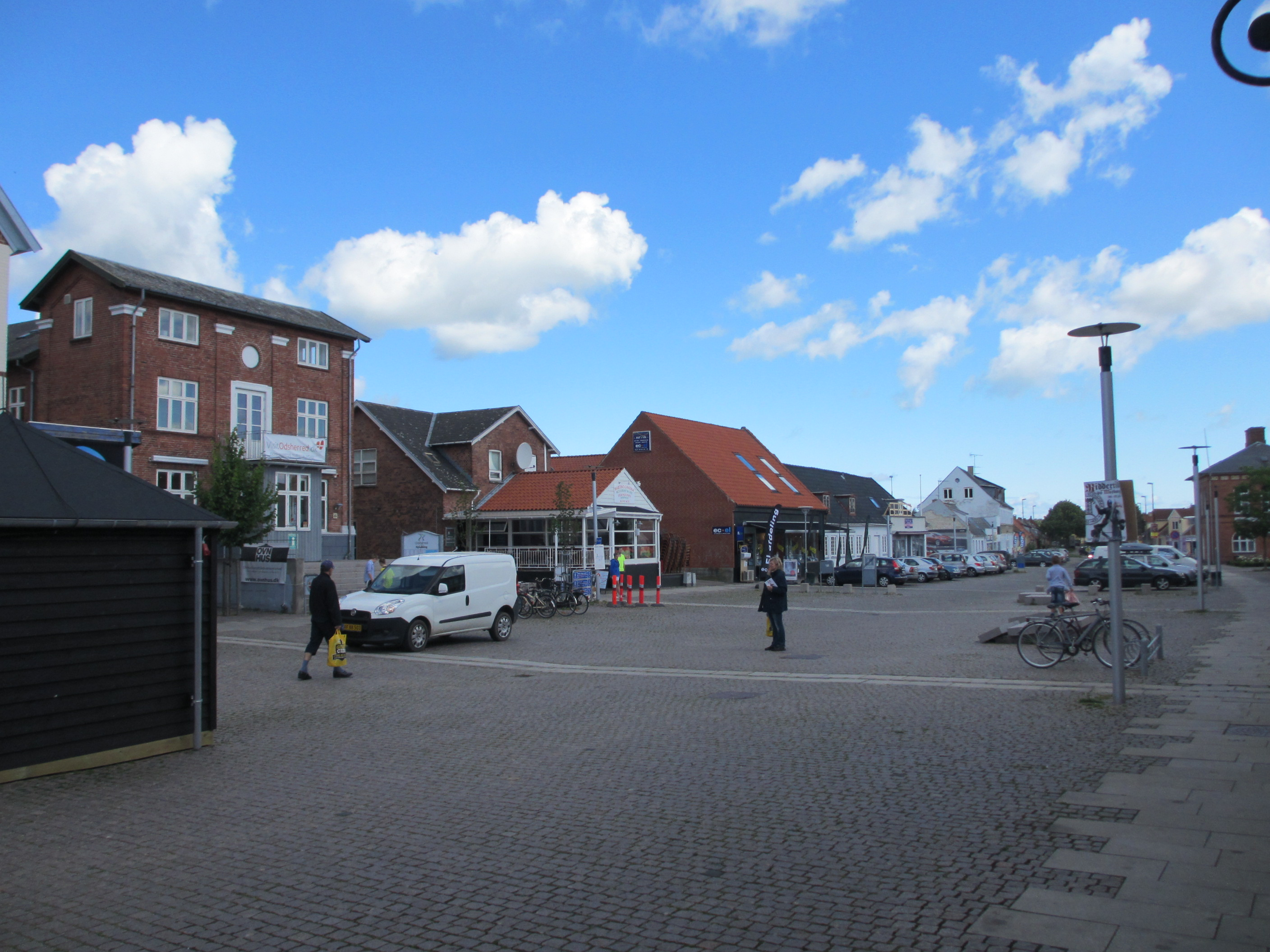

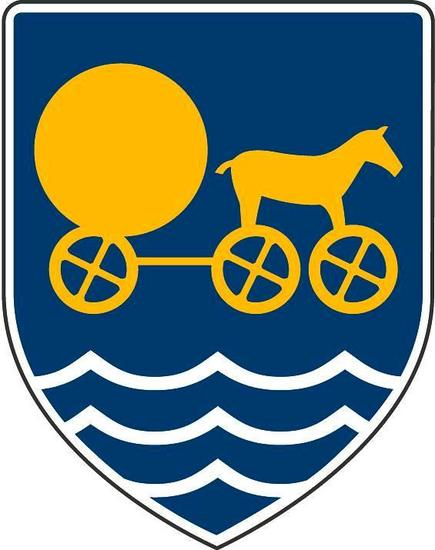
- Coat of arms

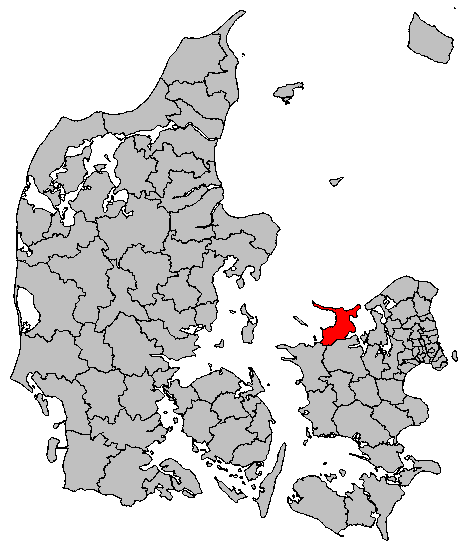
- Coordinates: 55°55′53″N 11°39′43″E
- Country: Denmark
- Region: Zealand
- Established: 1 January 2007
- Seat: Nykøbing Sjælland

Government
  - Mayor: Thomas Adelskov (S)

Area
  - Total: 355.3 km^{2} (137.2 sq mi)

Population (1 January 2026)
  - Total: 31,988
  - Density: 90.03/km^{2} (233.2/sq mi)
- Time zone: UTC+1 (CET)
  - Summer (DST): UTC+2 (CEST)
- Municipal code: 306
- Website: www.odsherred.dk

Odsherred Municipality (Danish: Odsherred Kommune) is a kommune in Odsherred, Region Sjælland in Denmark. It covers an area of 355 km^{2} with a total population of 31,988 (2026). Its seat is the town of Højby.

== History ==
On 1 January 2007 Odsherred municipality was created as the result of Kommunalreformen ("The Municipal Reform" of 2007), consisting of the former municipalities of Dragsholm, Nykøbing-Rørvig, and Trundholm

== Urban areas ==
The ten largest urban areas in the municipality are:

#	Locality	Population
1	Nykøbing Sjælland	5,212
2	Asnæs	2,914
3	Hørve	2,394
4	Fårevejle Stationsby	1,794
5	Vig	1,514
6	Højby	1,462
7	Rørvig	1.056
8	Fårevejle Kirkeby	717
9	Havnebyen	648
10	Grevinge	640

== Politics ==
=== Municipal council ===
Odsherred's municipal council consists of 25 members, elected every four years.

Below are the municipal councils elected since the Municipal Reform of 2007.

Election	Party								Total seats	Turnout	Elected mayor
Election	A	B	C	F	L	O	V	Ø	Total seats	Turnout	Elected mayor
2005	10	2	1	1		2	9		25	70.2%	Finn Madsen (A)
2009	9		1	3	1	3	8		25	68.6%	Thomas Adelskov (A)
2013	11			1	2	2	8	1	25	73.8%	Thomas Adelskov (A)
2017	12	1		1	1	2	7	1	25	72.9%	Thomas Adelskov (A)
Data from Kmdvalg.dk 2005, 2009, 2013 and 2017

== See also ==
- List of churches in Odsherred Municipality
