= Skram =

Skram may refer to:

== People ==
- Amalie Skram (1846–1905), Norwegian author
- Gustav Skram (1802–1865), Danish railroad director
- Hanne Skram (1937–2017), Norwegian dancer
- Henriette Skram (1841–1929), Danish school teacher
- Knut Skram (born 1937), Norwegian baritone
- Marius Skram-Jensen (1881–1975), Danish gymnast
- Peder Skram (died 1581), Danish Admiral

== Other uses ==
- HDMS Peder Skram, multiple ships
- Peder Skram-class frigate, class of frigates built for the Royal Danish Navy
