= List of companies listed on Nasdaq Copenhagen =

`

This is a list of companies that have (or had) their primary listing on Nasdaq Copenhagen, based in Copenhagen. Many of these companies have secondary listings on other stock exchanges.

== Companies ==
Company	Sector	Market cap	Nationality
AaB A/S	Consumer Discretionary	Small Cap	Danish
AGF	Consumer Discretionary	Small Cap	Danish
Agat Ejendomme	Real Estate	Small cap	Danish
ALK-Abelló	Healthcare	Large cap	Danish
Alm. Brand	Finance	Large cap	Danish
Ambu	Healthcare	Large cap	Danish
Asetek	Technology	Small cap	Danish
Atlantic Petroleum	Energy	Small cap	Danish
A. P. Møller-Mærsk	Industrials	Large cap	Danish
Aquaporin	Industrials	Small cap	Danish
Bang & Olufsen	Consumer Discretionary	Mid cap	Danish
Bank Nordik	Finance	Mid cap	Danish
Bavarian Nordic	Healthcare	Large cap	Danish
Better Collective	Technology	Large cap	Danish
BioPorto	Healthcare	Small cap	Danish
Boozt	Consumer Discretionary	Mid cap	Danish
Brd. Klee	Industrials	Small cap	Danish
Brdr. A & O Johansen	Industrials	Mid cap	Danish
Brøndby IF	Consumer Discretionary	Small cap	Danish
Carlsberg Group	Consumer Staples	Large cap	Danish
CBRAIN	Technology	Mid cap	Danish
Cemat	Technology	Small cap	Danish
ChemoMetec	Healthcare	Large cap	Danish
Chr. Hansen	Healthcare	Large cap	Danish
Coloplast	Healthcare	Large cap	Danish
Columbus A/S	Technology	Small cap	Danish
Copenhagen Capital	Real Estate	Small cap	Danish
D/S Norden	Industrials	Large cap	Danish
Danske Andelskassers Bank	Finance	Mid cap	Danish
Danske Bank	Finance	Large cap	Danish
Dantax	Consumer Discretionary	Small cap	Danish
Demant	Healthcare	Large cap	Danish
DFDS	Industrials	Large cap	Danish
Djurlands Bank	Finance	Small cap	Danish
DSV	Industrials	Large cap	Danish
EAC Invest	Industrials	Small cap	Danish
Ennogie Solar Group	Finance	Small cap	Danish
Fast Ejendom Danmark	Real Estate	Small cap	Danish
FirstFarms	Consumer Staples	Small cap	Danish
FLSmidth & Co.	Industrials	Large cap	Danish
Flügger Group	Industrials	Mid cap	Danish
Fynske Bank	Finance	Small cap	Danish
Gabriel Holding	Consumer Discretionary	Small cap	Danish
Genmab	Healthcare	Large cap	Danish
German High Street Properties	Real Estate	Small cap	Danish
Glunz & Jensen	Industrials	Small cap	Danish
GN Store Nord	Healthcare	Large cap	Danish
Green Hydrogen Systems	Energy	Mid cap	Danish
GreenMobility	Industrials	Small cap	Danish
Grønlandsbanken	Finance	Small cap	Danish
Gubra	Healthcare	Mid cap	Danish
Gyldendal	Consumer Discretionary	Mid cap	Danish
H. Lundbeck	Healthcare	Large cap	Danish
H+H International	Industrials	Mid cap	Danish
Harboes Bryggeri	Consumer Staples	Small cap	Danish
HusCompagniet	Consumer Discretionary	Small cap	Danish
Hvidbjerg Bank	Finance	Small cap	Danish
InterMail	Industrials	Small cap	Danish
ISS	Industrials	Large cap	Danish
Jeudan	Real Estate	Large cap	Danish
Jyske Bank	Finance	Large cap	Danish
Kreditbanken	Finance	Small cap	Danish
Københavns Lufthavne	Industrials	Large cap	Danish
Lollands Bank	Finance	Small cap	Danish
Luxor	Finance	Small cap	Danish
Lån og Spar Bank	Finance	Mid cap	Danish
Matas	Consumer Discretionary	Mid cap	Danish
MT Højgaard	Industrials	Mid cap	Danish
Møns Bank	Finance	Small cap	Danish
Netcompany	Technology	Large cap	Danish
Newcap	Finance	Small cap	Danish
Nilfisk	Industrials	Mid cap	Danish
NKT A/S	Industrials	Large cap	Danish
NNIT	Technology	Mid cap	Danish
Noble Corporation	Energy	Large cap	Danish
Nordea Bank	Finance	Large cap	Nordic
Nordfyns Bank	Finance	Small cap	Danish
North Media	Consumer Discretionary	Mid cap	Danish
Novo Nordisk	Healthcare	Large cap	Danish
Novozymes	Healthcare	Large cap	Danish
NTG Nordic Transport Group	Industrials	Mid cap	Danish
NTR	Industrials	Small cap	Danish
Orphazyme	Healthcare	Small cap	Danish
Pandora	Consumer Discretionary	Large cap	Danish
Parken Sport & Entertainment	Consumer Discretionary	Small cap	Danish
Park Street	Real Estate	Small cap	Danish
Penneo	Technology	Small cap	Danish
Per Aarsleff	Industrials	Mid cap	Danish
Pharma Equity Group	Healthcare	Small cap	Danish
Prime Office	Real Estate	Small cap	Danish
Rias	Industrials	Small cap	Danish
Ringkjøbing Landbobank	Finance	Large cap	Danish
Roblon	Industrials	Small cap	Danish
Rockwool	Industrials	Large cap	Danish
Rovsing	Industrials	Small cap	Danish
Royal Unibrew	Consumer Staples	Large cap	Danish
RTX	Telecommunications	Large cap	Danish
SAS	Consumer Discretionary	Small cap	Danish
Scandinavian Brake Systems	Consumer Discretionary	Small cap	Danish
Scandinavian Investment Group	Industrials	Small cap	Danish
Scandinavian Tobacco Group	Consumer Staples	Large cap	Danish
Schouw & Co.	Industrials	Large cap	Danish
Shape Robotics	Technology	Small cap	Danish
Silkeborg IF Invest	Consumer Discretionary	Small cap	Danish
SKAKO	Industrials	Small cap	Danish
Skjern Bank	Finance	Small cap	Danish
Solar A/S	Industrials	Mid cap	Danish
SP Group A/S	Industrials	Mid cap	Danish
Spar Nord Bank	Finance	Large cap	Danish
Sparekassen Sjælland-Fyn	Finance	Mid cap	Danish
Strategic Investments	Finance	Small cap	Danish
TCM Group	Consumer Discretionary	Small cap	Danish
Tivoli	Consumer Discretionary	Mid cap	Danish
Topdanmark	Finance	Large cap	Danish
TORM	Industrials	Large cap	Danish
Trifork	Technology	Mid cap	Danish
Tryg	Finance	Large cap	Danish
UIE Plc	Consumer Staples	Mid cap	Danish
Vestas Wind Systems	Energy	Large cap	Danish
Vestjysk Bank	Finance	Mid cap	Danish
Zealand Pharma	Healthcare	Large cap	Danish
Ørsted	Utilities	Large cap	Danish
Össur	Healthcare	Large cap	Icelandic
