= Holbæk =

Town in northern Zealand, Denmark

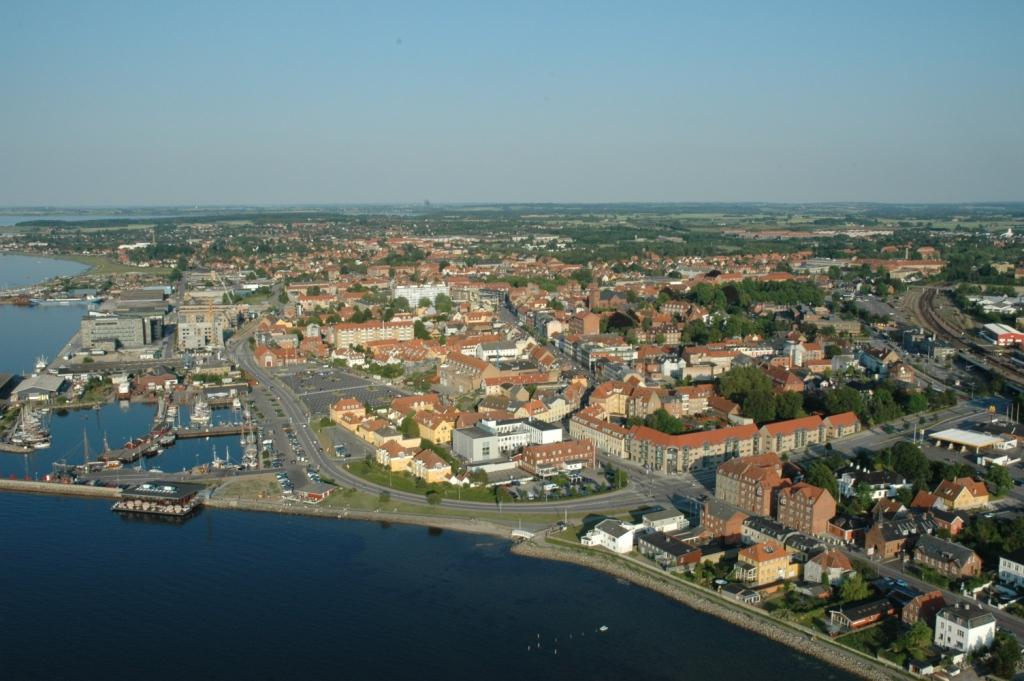
- June 2007 aerial photograph

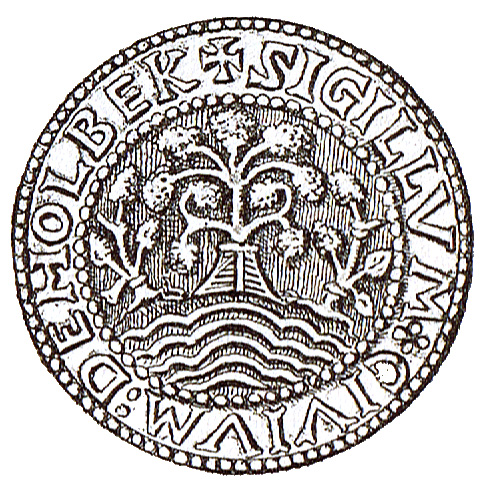
- Seal Coat of arms

- Location within Denmark Location within Denmark Region Zealand
- Coordinates: 55°42′56″N 11°43′21″E
- Country: Denmark
- Region: Zealand (Sjælland)
- Municipality: Holbæk
- Founded: 1236

Area
  - Urban: 14 km^{2} (5.4 sq mi)
- Elevation: 11 m (36 ft)

Population (2026)
  - Urban: 31,112
  - Urban density: 2,200/km^{2} (5,800/sq mi)
  - Gender: 14,841 males and 16,271 females
  - Municipality: 75,009
- Demonym: Holbækker
- Time zone: UTC+1 (CET)
  - Summer (DST): UTC+2 (CEST)
- Postal code: 4300
- Area code: (+45) 00
- Website: holbaek.dk

Holbæk (Danish pronunciation: [ˈhʌlˀpek]) is a town in Denmark and the seat of Holbæk municipality with a population of 31,112 (1 January 2026). It is located in the northwestern part of Region Sjælland, Denmark.

Holbæk is located on Zealand, on the banks of Holbæk Fjord, an inlet of the larger Isefjord. Holbæk is a commercial and industrial center for the surrounding area. By rail, Holbæk is served by Danske Statsbaner's line from Roskilde to Kalundborg, which runs through the city. Vestsjællands Lokalbaner connects Holbæk by rail to Nykøbing Sjælland. The city is a major hub for the Movia bus routes. Holbæk has an active commercial seaport that serves as the harbor for the ferry to Orø (island). Near the harbor there is a substantial marina.

== History ==
City Seal ca. 1400

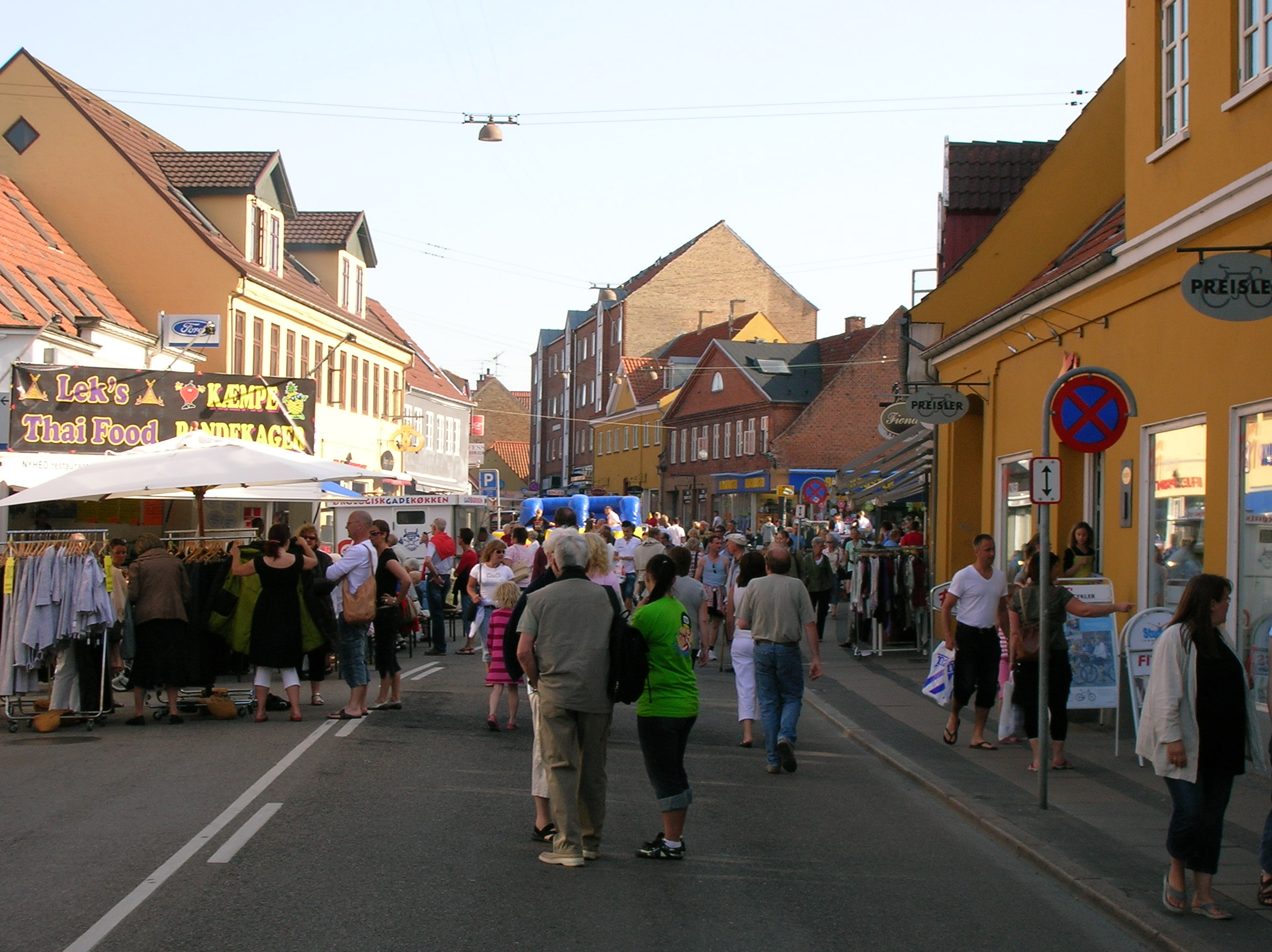
A street market

Holbæk is first mentioned in official documents in Absalon's letter of 8 June 1199, in which he granted the majority of his estates to Sorø Klosterkirke in Sorø. It was called Holbækgaard, a larger farm belonging to a nobleman, around which the city eventually developed.

Next it appears in Valdemar the Victorious's book of properties (see Kong Valdemars Jordebog on the Danish Wikipedia) in 1231. Valdmar broke ground for Holbæk Slot (Holbæk Castle) in 1236.

Holbæk grew from then on but is not mentioned again until around 1400 when Margaret I came for a court proceeding that granted her territories in Jutland. The event may have triggered the creation of the first city seal, which shows the three trees by the water that are the prominent features of the current seal.

In early 20th century, the town became the testing-ground for Bedre Byggeskik architecture.

== Economy ==
Companies headquartered in Holbæk include Sparekassen Sjælland-Fyn and Pharmacosmos

== Culture ==
Culturally, Holbæk can be noted for Musikhus Elværket, a converted power station that serves as a concert venue for modern music.

For more than 40 years, Bogart was a traditional antiquarian in Holbæk. In 2021 new owners transformed the place into a book café and live performance venue with a mix of concerts, lectures and open mic.

== Media ==
The local newspaper is Nordvestnyt, which is published Monday to Saturday and is published by Sjællandske Medier. In 2022, the newspaper had 39,000 weekly readers.

Holbaekonline.dk is a local news website that brings news, sports, and entertainment from Holbæk and Holbæk Municipality.

Holbæk Radio is a local radio station run by volunteers. It started in 2015. In addition to music, the radio station also provides local news, and citizens have the opportunity to create their own segments on the radio. Holbæk Radio can be heard on the FM band 104.7 as well as through online streaming.

== Sport ==
The city is home to the Holbæk B&I football club, who as of 2023 played in the fourth tier in the Danish football league system. They have played at the Holbæk Sportsby (Sports City) football stadium since its construction in 2019.

The Holbæk Sportsby (Sports City) was constructed in 2019 and has 23,000 square metres of space indoors over two floors and 47 hectares outdoors. It includes the new Sports City football stadium, athletics stadium, swimming pool, badminton hall, synthetic football pitches, tennis courts and the Padel Klub.

The Holbæk Stadium was, which existed from 1948 to 2019, when it was demolished for housing, was the former home of Holbæk B&I. It was also an athletics stadium and hosted motorcycle speedway between 1950 and 1954. It held the final of the Danish Individual Speedway Championship in 1954.

== Transportation ==
=== Rail ===
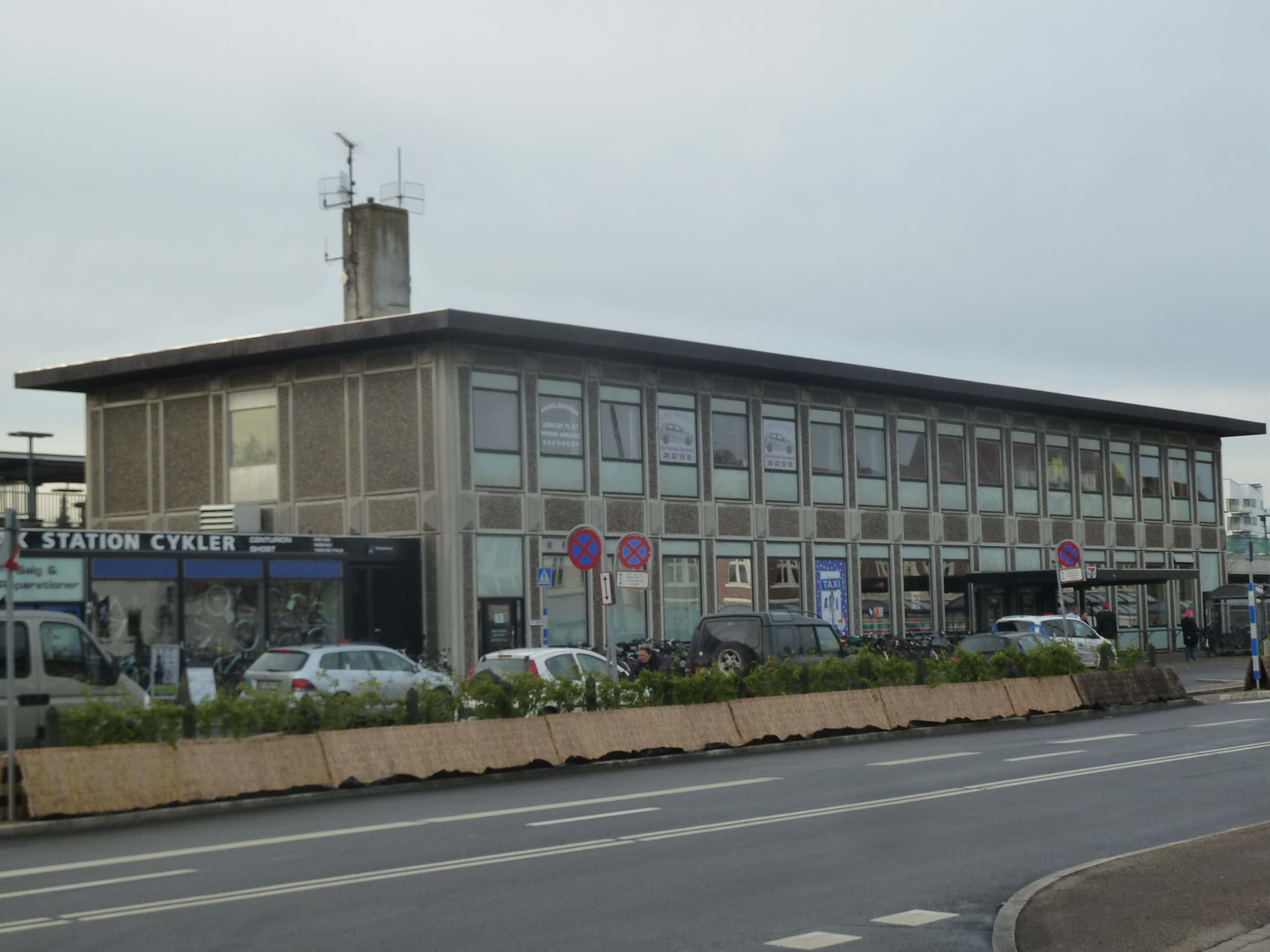
Holbæk railway station.

The Northwest Line connects Holbæk with Kalundborg and Roskilde and the rest of the Danish rail network, and the Odsherred Line connects Holbæk with Nykøbing Sjælland. Holbæk railway station is the principal railway station of the town, and offers direct regional train services to Copenhagen, Roskilde and Kalundborg operated by the national railway company DSB and local train services to Nykøbing Sjælland operated by the regional railway company Lokaltog. The western part of the town is also served by the railway halt Stenhus.

== Notable people ==
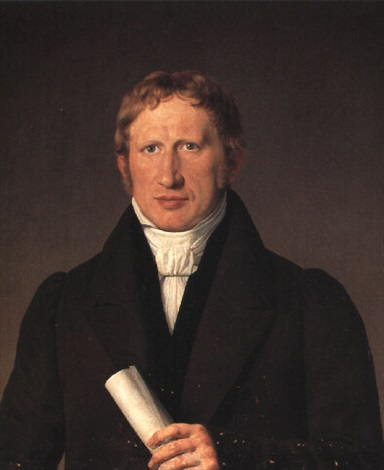
Ludvig Christian de Brinck Seidelin, 1832

=== Public Service & public thinking ===
- Søren Nielsen May (died 1679 in Holbæk) parish priest and provost in Holbæk
- Albert Borgard (1659–1751) a Danish artillery and engineer officer.
- Michael Bille (1680–1756 in Holbæk) a Danish Admiral
- Christen Friis Rottbøll (1727 at Hørbygård–1797) a Danish physician and botanist
- Ole Johansen Winstrup (1782 in Winstrup–1867) a self-taught Danish engineer and inventor
- Ludvig Christian Brinck-Seidelin (1787 in Eriksholm–1865) a Danish civil servant, landowner, and politician
- Ludwig A. Colding (1815–1888) a Danish civil engineer and physicist
- Edvard Jünger (1823–1899) precision mechanic and instrument maker
- Ellen Nielsen (1871–1960) a Danish-born teacher and missionary in Manchuria
- Mads Tofte (born 1959) a Danish computer scientist, brought up in Holbæk
- Claus Bjørn Larsen (born 1963) award-winning Danish press photographer

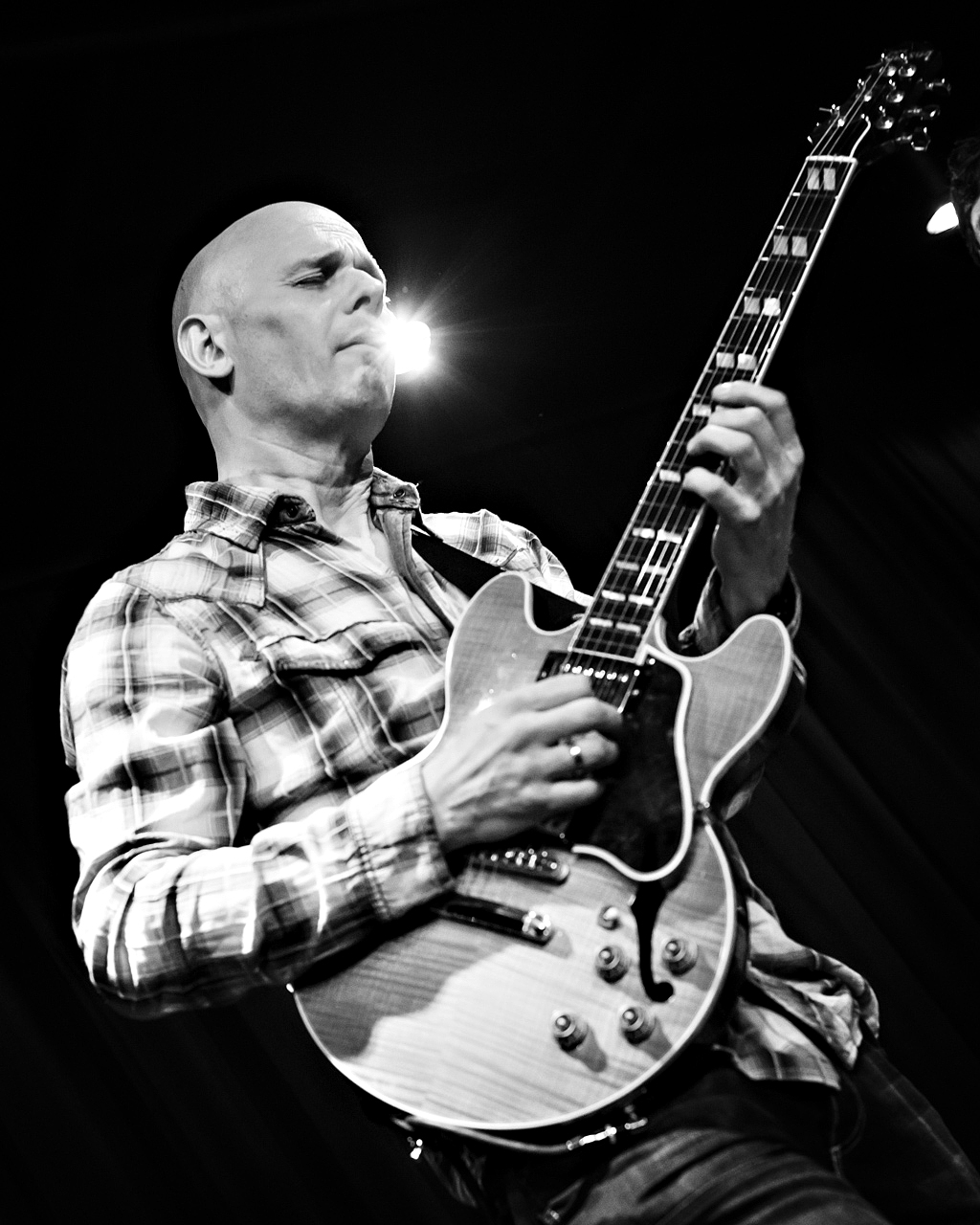
Søren Reiff, 2015

=== The Arts ===
- Paula Trock (1889–1979) a Danish weaver of curtains in distinguished places
- Agnete Hoy (1914–2000) British/Danish potter; expertise in glazing and firing
- Aage Stentoft (1914–1990) composer, film score composer and theatre director
- Dan Sterup-Hansen (1918–1995) painter and illustrator
- Niels Bernhart (1946–2008) a Danish pianist, composer and lecturer
- Inga Nielsen (1946–2008) soprano opera singer
- Søren Reiff (born 1962) guitarist, producer, composer and author
- Cutfather (born 1968) stage name of Mich Hedin Hansen, a Danish music producer
- Jim Lyngvild (born 1978) a Danish designer, writer, fashion columnist and TV personality
- Mikael Brandrup (born 1984) a Danish visual artist and graphic designer in the USA

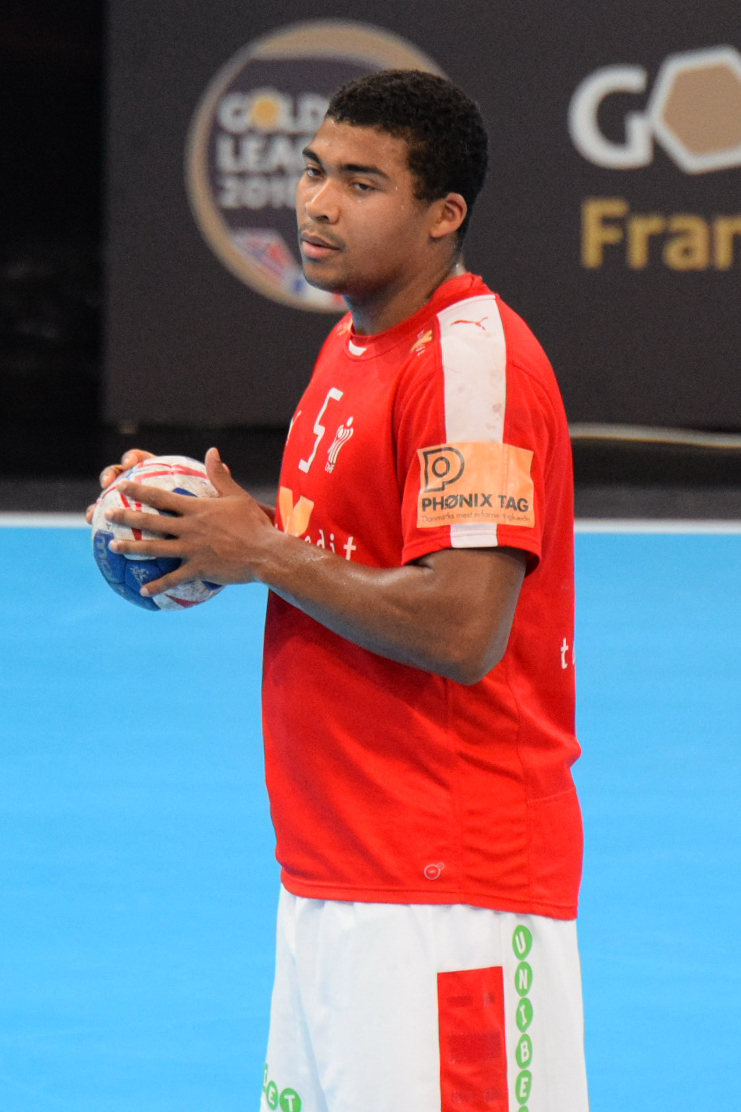
Mads Mensah Larsen 2016

=== Sport ===
- Niels Tune-Hansen (born 1953) footballer, 220 club caps and 15 for Denmark
- Susanne Augustesen (born 1956) a Danish former international footballer
- Christian Poulsen (born 1981) footballer, over 452 club caps and 92 for Denmark
- Mads Pieler Kolding (born 1988) male badminton player who specializes in doubles
- Mads Mensah Larsen (born 1991) handball player
- Simone Boye Sørensen (born 1992) a Danish footballer, plays for Bayern Munich
- Frederik Colberg (born 1993) a Danish badminton player
- Nick Sörensen (born 1994) a Danish-born Swedish professional ice hockey player
- John Axelsen (born 1998) a Danish amateur golfer
- Torben Winther, (born 1949), Danish handball coach who coached the Denmark men's national handball team from 2000 to 2005

=== Others ===
- Stefan G. Rasmussen (born 1947), airline pilot (Scandinavian Airlines System Flight 751) and politician

== International relations ==
=== Twin towns – Sister cities ===
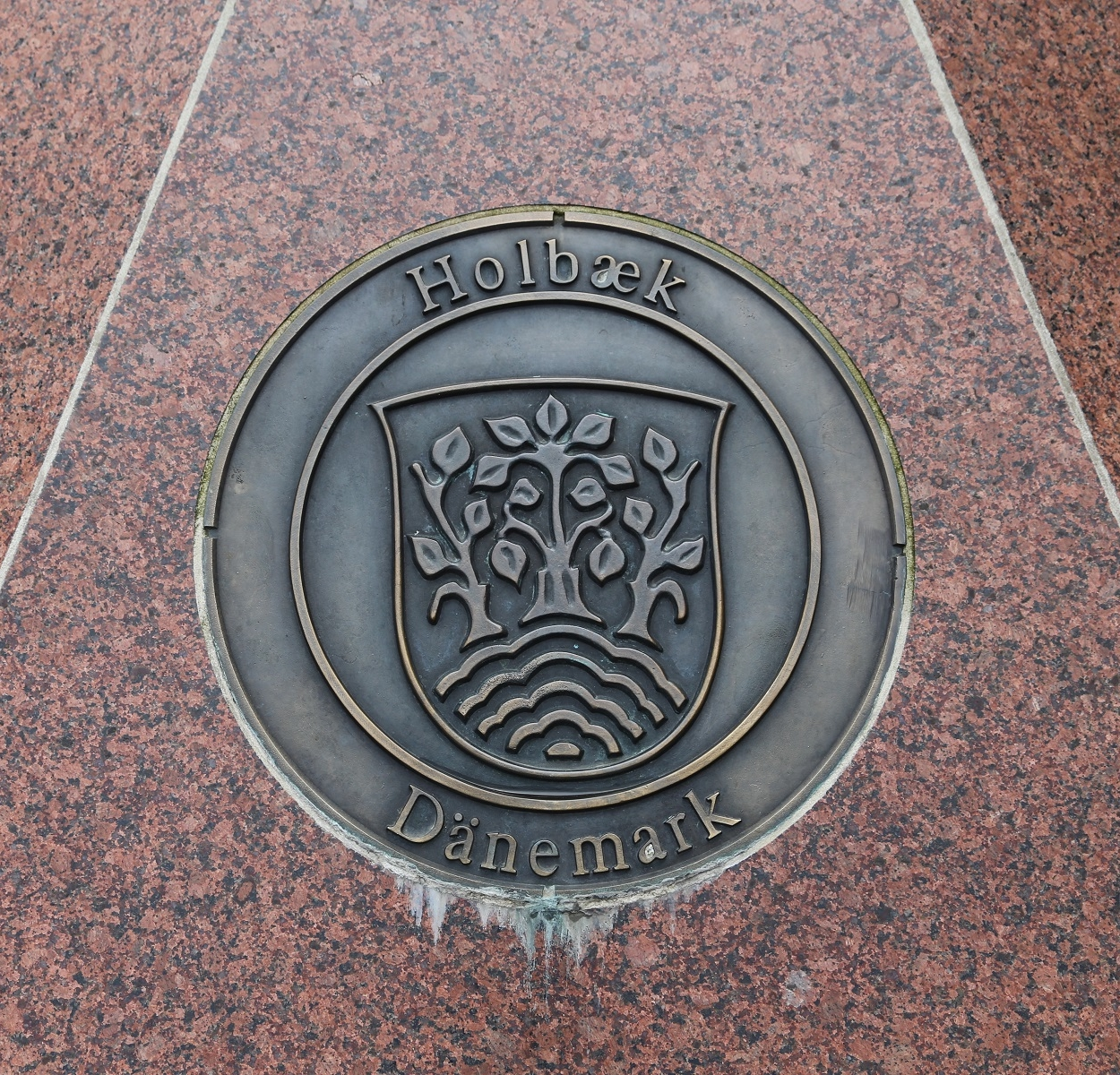
Coat of arms at twin town Celle (Germany), granite artwork below signpost

Holbæk is twinned with:

- Celle, Germany
- Dorchester, Dorset, United Kingdom. resulted from a shared interest in community plays. Groups of actors from the two towns each took part in the other's community play in the early 1990s and this resulted in the formal twinning in 1992.
- Botevgrad, Bulgaria

== Sources ==
- City History (in Danish)
- NetBorger.dk Statistics (in Danish)
- Statistikbanken Statistics (in Danish)
