= The Crystal, Copenhagen =

Coordinates: 55.6705°N 12.5754°E

The Crystal
- Krystallen
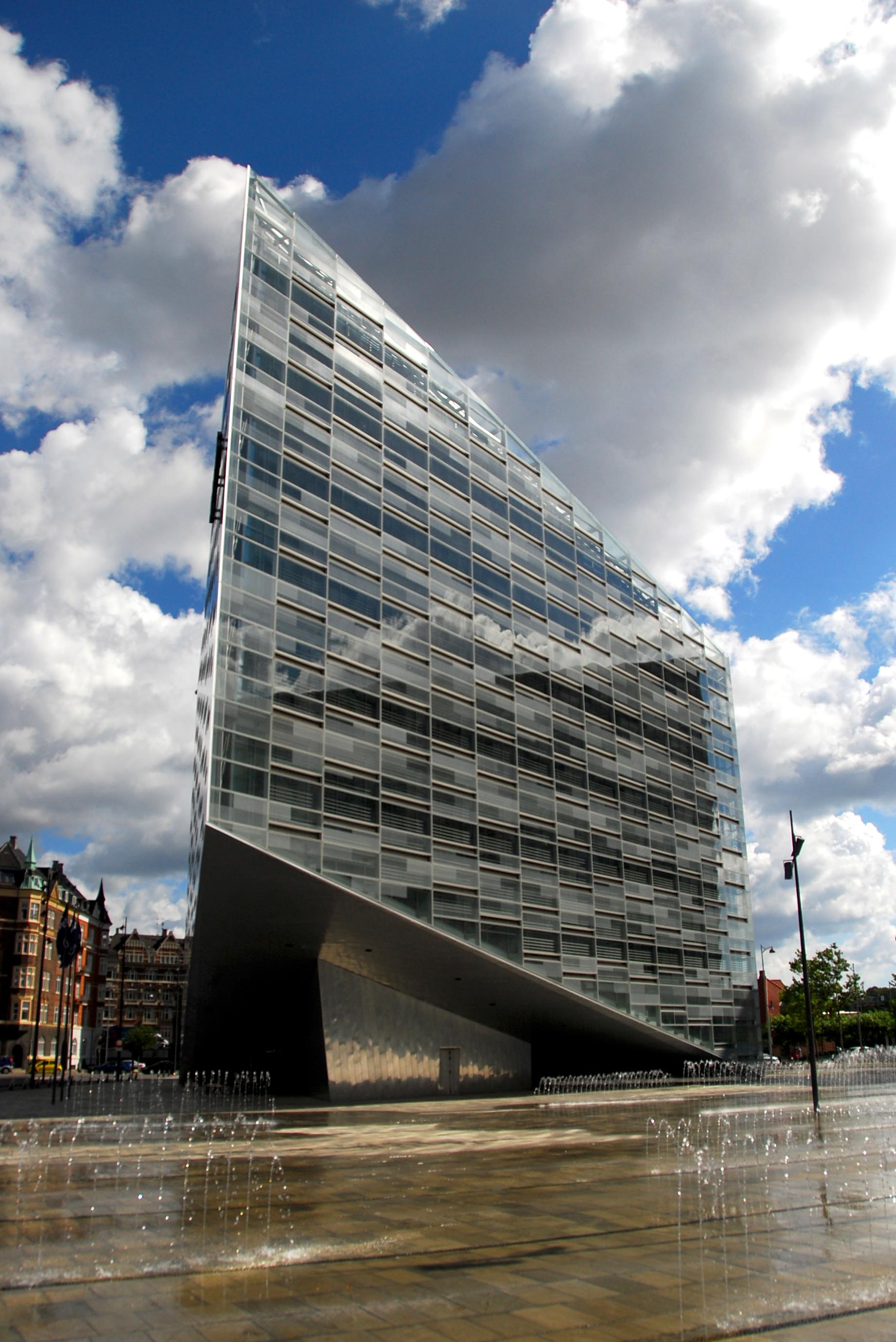
- Interactive map of the The Crystal area

General information
- Location: Copenhagen, Denmark
- Inaugurated: 11 March 2011
- Client: Boozt

Technical details
- Floor count: 6

Design and construction
- Architecture firm: Schmidt Hammer Lassen
- Awards: LEAF Award (structural system)

The Crystal (Danish: Krystallen) is a free-standing, environmentally friendly, Boozt headquarter at the Kalvebod Brygge waterfront in Copenhagen, Denmark. Designed by Schmidt Hammer Lassen, it takes its name from its light, crystalline form which rests on only a single point and a single line, allowing for unhindered views as well as passage underneath the building.

== Sustainability ==
The building has a low energy-consumption of only 70 kWh per sqm, or 25 per cent less than the requirements of the existing energy legislation in Denmark. This is obtained with the highly effective insulating triple-layered inner glass façade which has a U-value of only 0.7 Wh per sqm. The roof is covered with photovoltaic panels generating 80,000 kWh per year.

== Plaza ==
The plaza next to the building is designed by Stig L. Andersson in collaboration with Schmidt Hammer Lassen. Its light-coloured slate paving continues into the ground floor of the building, integrating the exterior and interior spaces. The plaza is dominated by a waterfeature, Denmark's largest fountain, consisting of a circular water basin and 2,000 valves arranged in long straight lines which spray water in varying heights of up to 2.5 metres. The water feature is illuminated at night. There are benches and a single row of trees along one side of the space.

== Awards ==
- 2011 LEAF Award ('structural design' category)

== Gallery ==
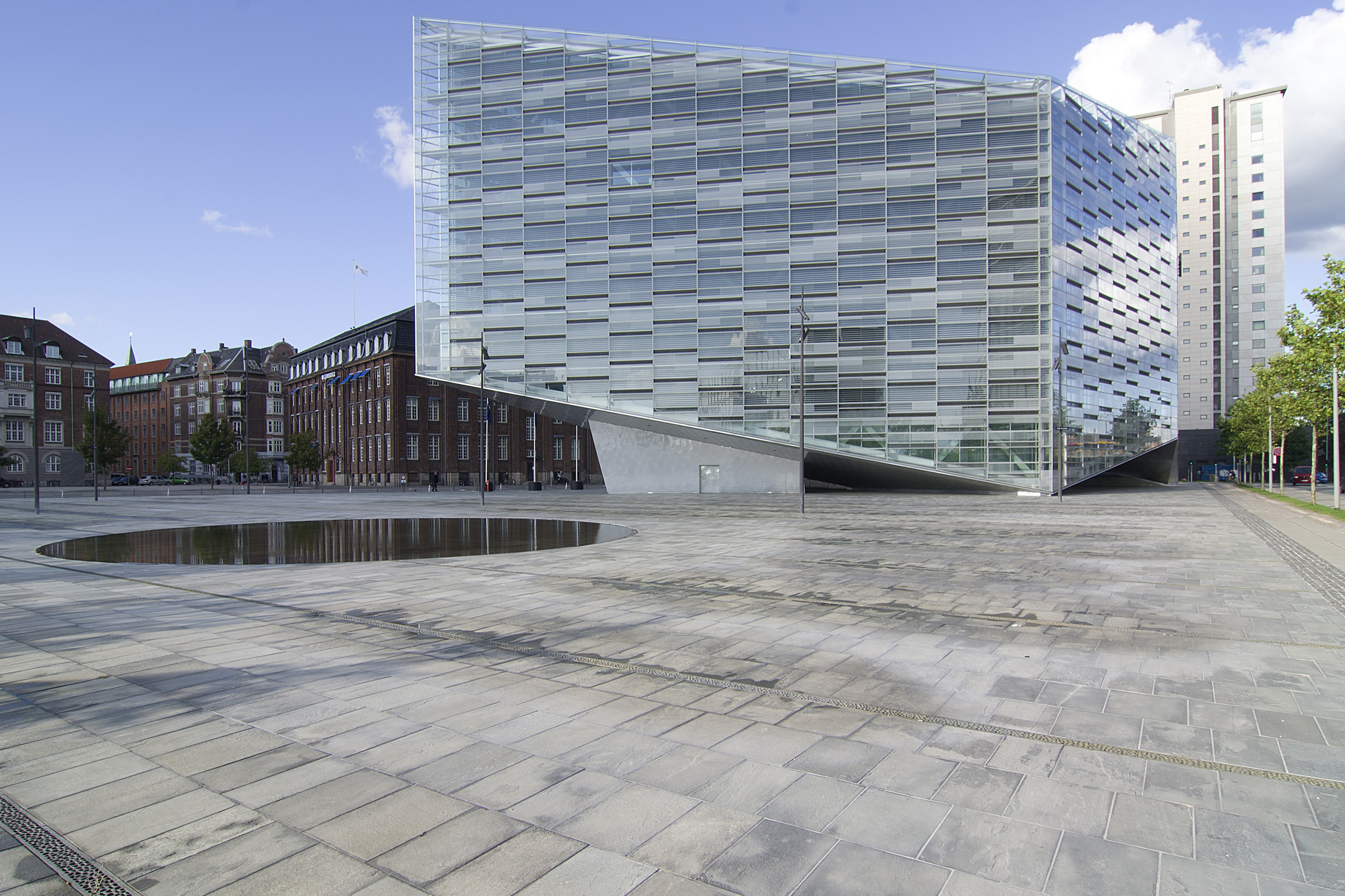

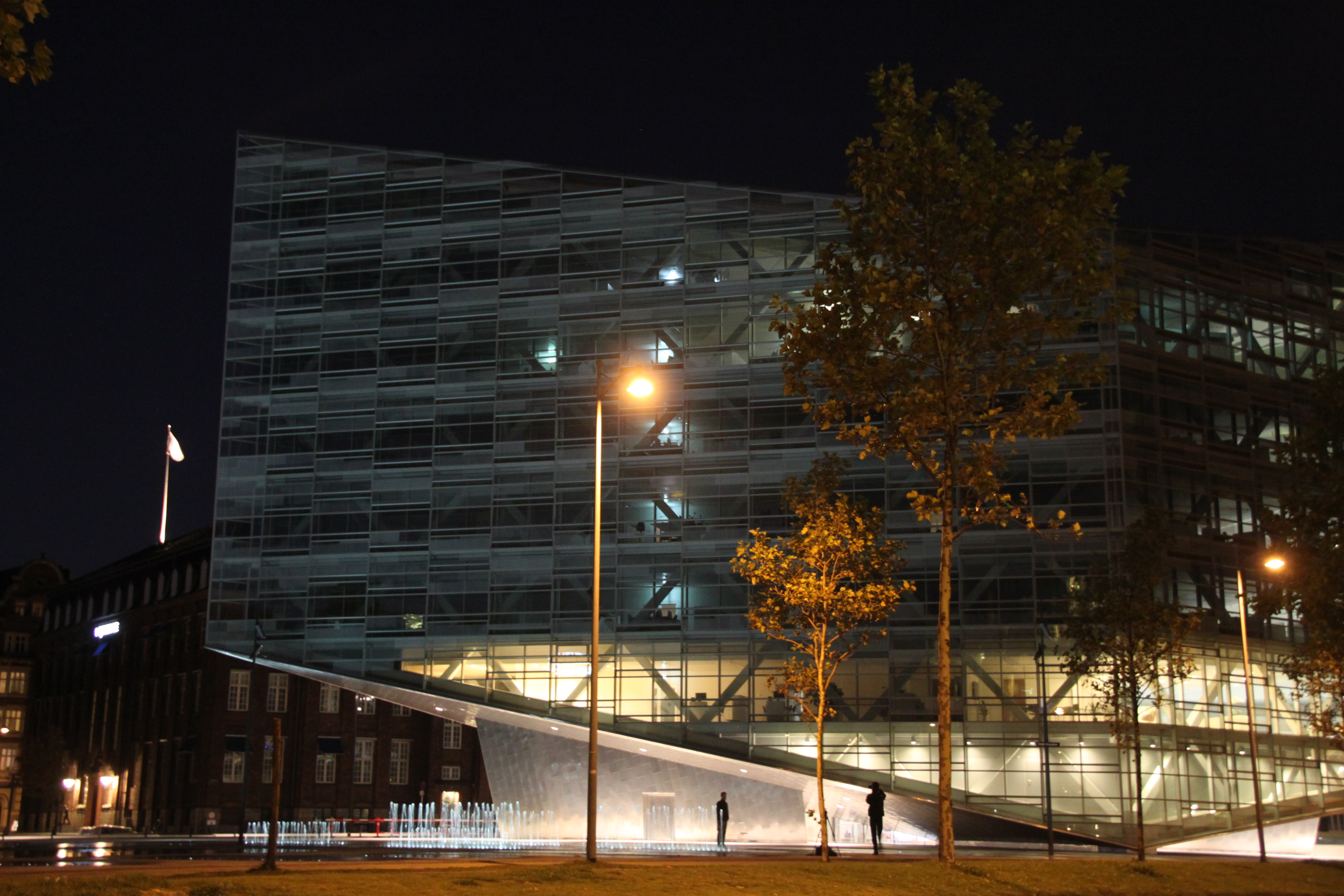
