= Søren Reiff =

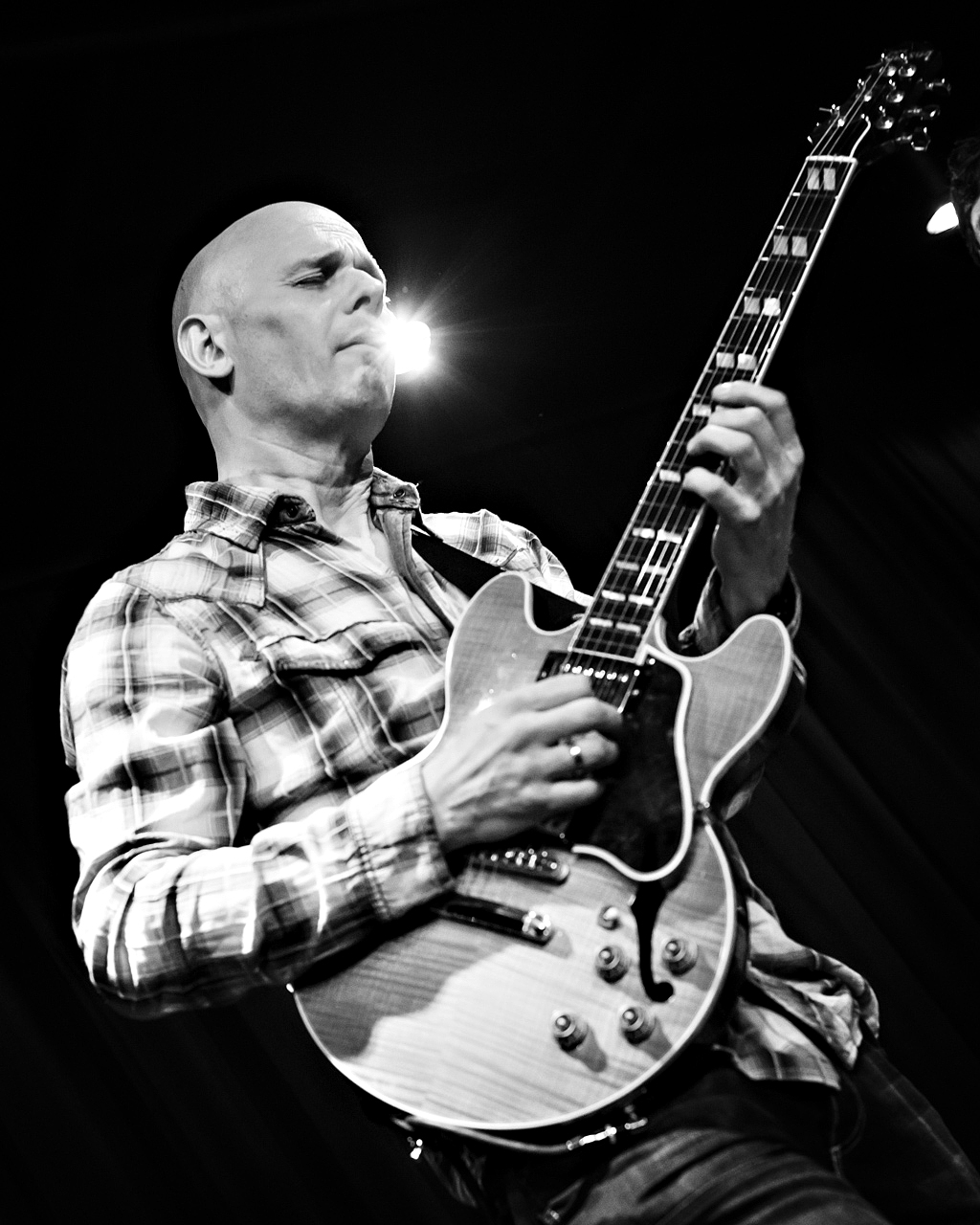
- Performing at Café Smedjen in Hillerød

Background information
- Born: October 22, 1962 (age 63); Holbæk, Denmark
- Genres: Jazz, jazz fusion, funk
- Occupations: Musician, composer, music producer, musical director, author
- Instrument: Guitar
- Years active: 1986–present
- Labels: DaRoof, Gateway Music
- Website: sorenreiff.com

Søren Reiff (born October 22, 1962) is a Danish guitarist, producer, composer and author. He was born, in Holbæk, Denmark, the son of painter Tove Reiff and potter Erik Reiff.

== Career ==
Reiff has since the mid-eighties been guitarist in house bands on Danish National television, which has led him to play with artists like Randy Crawford, Robert Palmer, Bonnie Tyler, Toots Thielemans and others.

During the nineties Reiff started working as musical director on Danish National TV. He has worked as musical director for Chaka Khan, David Sanborn, Mark King, and many others on these shows.

As an author Reiff has published five books: Reiffs riffs (2004), Reiffs rytmer (2005), Reiffs riffs II (2008), Reiffs rytmer II (2011) and Gode Råd ... er guld værd (2008).

Reiff has released three albums as a recording artist. In 2003 the first album: Reiff jr Funky Flavas – this album also features Mike Stern, Michael Ruff, and Nabiha Bensouda. In 2010 the second album was released: Soren Reiff – Miss you – which features David Garfield (keyboards), Will Lee (bass), Steve Ferrone (drums), Ricky Lawson (drums), John Peña (bass) Veronica Mortensen (vocals) and Michito Sanchez (percussion). In 2015 his third album was released: Soren Reiff – Gratitude – which features Jimmy Haslip (bass), Gary Novak (drums), David Garfield (keyboards), Alexx Daye (Vocals), Kim S. Hansen (keyboards), Michito Sanchez (percussion), Christina Boelskifte (vocals)

Reiff has played on several shows of the American television program Studiojams, among others with violinist Tracy Silverman. Reiff has also been co-host on the show The Color of Jazz.

Reiff plays all guitar samples, and was a part of the team developing the sample library: "Scarbee Funk guitarist" which was released in 2011.

Founder of Den Rytmiske Højskole's course for Songwriters and Producers.

In 1998, Reiff was included in International Who's Who in Music, Volume Two, Popular Music.

== Discography ==
- Who would you be (EP) (1999) (with Christina Boelskifte)
- Funky Flavas (album) (2003)
- Miss you (album) (2010)
- Gratitude (album) (2015)

== Books ==
- Reiffs riffs (2004, Dansk Sang)
- Reiffs rytmer (2005, Dansk Sang)
- Reiffs riffs II (2008, Dansk Sang)
- Gode råd ... er guld værd (2008, DaRoof)
- Reiffs rytmer II (2011, Dansk Sang)

== Awards and honors ==
- Most Inspiring Guitarist 2017 Studio Jams International Inspiration Award, 2018

== Memberships ==
- Danish Musicians Union
- Danish Songwriters Guild
- KODA
