= Roskilde Avis =

Danish newspaper

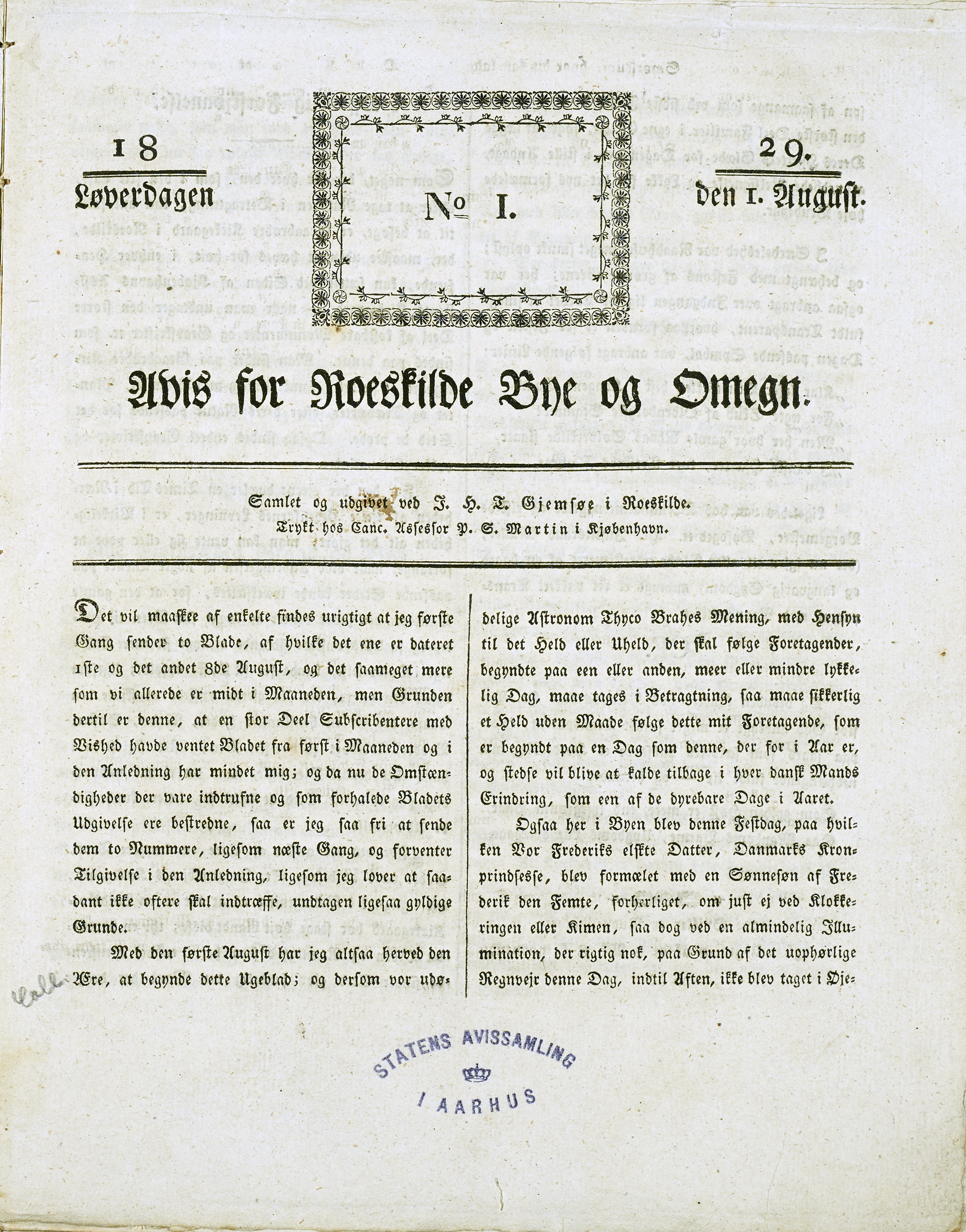
- Roskilde Avis in 1829
- Founded: 1829
- Language: Danish

Roskilde Avis is a weekly newspaper published in Roskilde, Denmark. It is currently owned by Sjællandske Medier.

== History ==
Roskilde Avis was founded in 1829 by merchant J. H. T. Gemzøe. The newspaper was in 1950 owned and published by Svend Jacobsen (born 1894). He was also the owner of Roskilde Avis Bogtrykkeri.

== Today ==
Roskilde Mediecenter was from 1897 owned by Sjællandske Medier (50 %) and Politikens Lokalaviser (50 %). The company published Roskilde Avis Midtuge (Roskilde Newspaper Mid-Week) and Roskilde Avis Weekend (Roskilde Newspaper Weekend), both with a circulation of 50,000 in the Roskilde area. On 1 December 2016, Sjællandske Medier acquired Politikens Lokalaviser's share of the company.
