= Sjællandske Medier =

- Type: Limited company
- Industry: Media
- Founded: 1990
- Headquarters: Ringsted, Denmark
- Key people: Jens Nicolaisen (CEO), Niels Jørgen Hansen (chairman)
- Revenue: DKK 468 million (2015)
- Number of employees: 517 (2015)
- Website: www.sn.dk

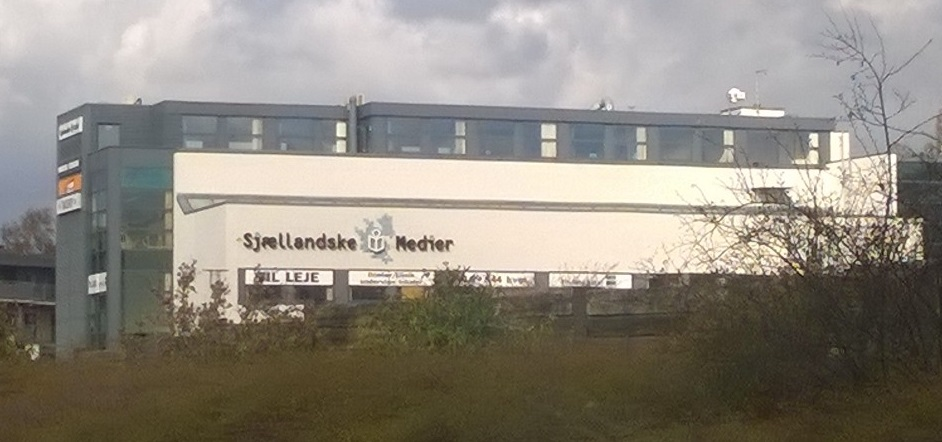
A photo showing the building of Sjællandske Medier (Zealand Media). Taken in Næstved, Denmark.

Sjællandske Medier is a regional Danish media company with activities on the island of Zealand (outside Copenhagen) and headquarters in Ringsted, Denmark. It publishes the newspapers Dagbladet, Frederiksborg amtsavis and Sjællandkse as well as a number of local weekly publications and has also activities in local radio and television, advertisement and book publishing.

== History ==
The modern company originates from the merger of Næstved Tidende and Sjællandske Tidende in 1986. The company A/S Sjællandske Dagblade was established in 1990. Today Sjællandske Medier A/S houses Dagbladet, Sjællandske, Frederiksborg Amts Avis and Nordvestnyt.

== Operations ==
Sjællandske Medier is headquartered in Ringsted. The company has editorial offices in 28 cities on Zealand with the ones in Hillerød, Roskilde, Greve, Køge, Ringsted, Holbæk, Kalundborg, Slagelse, Næstved and Vordingborg as the largest .

== Websites ==
- sn.dk witch covers Zeeland with local news except the capital city of Copenhagen
- vdonline.dk a local website covering Slagelse, Korsør and Skælskør
- Byportalerne.dk - local news and stories

=== Newspapers ===
- Dagbladet
- Nordvestnyt
- Frederiksborg Amtsavis
- Sjællandske

=== Weekly publications ===
Sjællandske Medier publishes 34 free weeklies with a combined weekly circulation of 785,000 and another 245,000 every fortnight on Zealand and Møn.

They are published in Hillerød, Roskilde, Greve, Køge, Store Heddinge, Fakse, Haslev, Ringsted, Borup, Tølløse, Holbæk, Jyderup, Nykøbing Sjælland, Asnæs, Kalundborg, Høng, Slagelse, Næstved, Vordingborg, Stege and Nykøbing Falster.

=== Radio and TV ===
Sjællanske Medier operates the local radio stations Radio SLR and Radio Køge and produces local television in 24 Produktion.

=== Advertisement ===
Sjællandske Medier operates the advertisement agencies Sjællandske Medier/Holst Reklamebureau in Næstved and RA Reklame in Roskilde.

=== Printing ===
The company has Rotary printing press activities in Ringsted, Holbæk and Vordingborg/Ørslev as well as a book printing house in Tølløse.

== Websites ==
sn.dk witch covers Zeeland with local news except the capital city of Copenhagen vdonline.dk a local website covering Slagelse, Korsør and Skælskør Byportalerne.dk - local news and stories

=== Newspapers ===
- Dagbladet
- Nordvestnyt
- Frederiksborg Amtsavis
- Sjællandske

=== Weekly publications ===
Sjællandske Medier publishes 34 free weeklies with a combined weekly circulation of 785,000 and another 245,000 every fortnight on Zealand and Møn.

They are published in Hillerød, Roskilde, Greve, Køge, Store Heddinge, Fakse, Haslev, Ringsted, Borup, Tølløse, Holbæk, Jyderup, Nykøbing Sjælland, Asnæs, Kalundborg, Høng, Slagelse, Næstved, Vordingborg, Stege and Nykøbing Falster.

=== Radio and TV ===
Sjællanske Medier operates the local radio stations Radio SLR and Radio Køge and produces local television in 24 Produktion.

=== Advertisement ===
Sjællandske Medier operates the advertisement agencies Sjællandske Medier/Holst Reklamebureau in Næstved and RA Reklame in Roskilde.

=== Printing ===
The company has Rotary printing press activities in Ringsted, Holbæk and Vordingborg/Ørslev as well as a book printing house in Tølløse.

== See also ==
- Roskilde Avis
