= Agnete Hoy =

British potter (1914–2000)

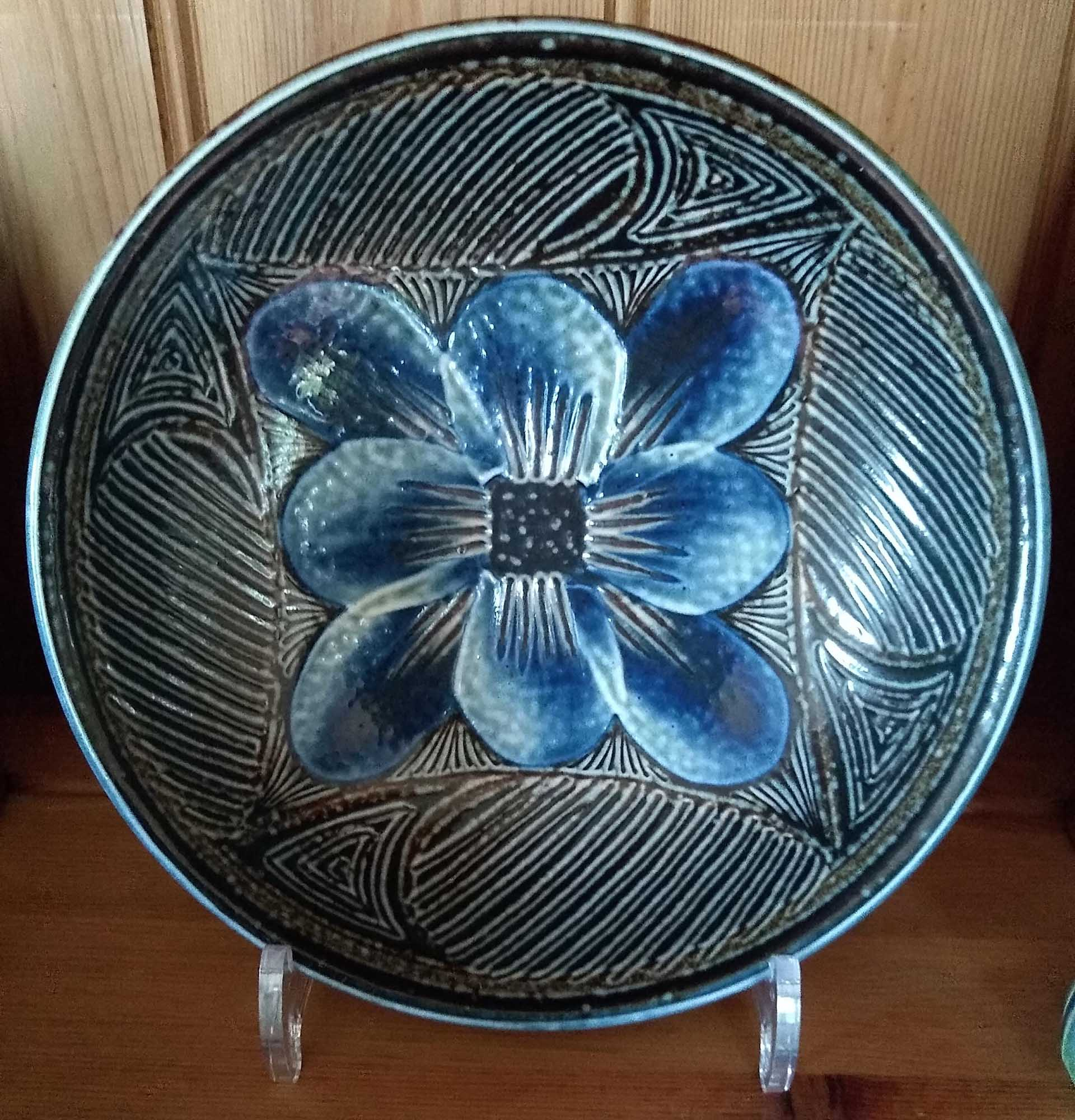
Doulton Lambeth bowl by Agnete Hoy circa 1956

Agnete Hoy (2 November 1914 – 1 April 2000), also known as Anita Hoy, was an English artist potter who managed successfully to create a bridge between industrial ceramics and work of the studio potters. Having studied in Copenhagen she went on to work for the Holbæk and Saxbo potteries in the late 1930s before returning to England. Agnete's Danish experience helped her creativity within the English ceramic industry during the war years and the following period.

Her technical expertise related to glazes and firing was gained on the factory floor and used to produce her distinctive designs for production at both the art studio of Buller's in Milton, Staffordshire and Royal Doulton in Lambeth, London.

== Early life ==
Agnete Hoy was born in Southall, England, on 3 November 1914 to her Danish parents, Soren and Anna Blichfeldt, who had been living in England since 1906. Soren, a research bacteriologist from Copenhagen, had been invited to set up a new scientific laboratory for the Maypole Margarine Works in Southall.

Being born into a reasonably well-off, middle-class family, Agnete had a peaceful childhood. In common with other families of the same social standing she and her two elder brothers, Svend and Eric, were looked after by a nanny and the household also supported a cook and maid. This happy childhood was to end abruptly with the early death of her father in 1921 when Agnete was only 7 years old. This had a profound effect on her for the whole of her life. The family's income was now drastically reduced and her mother took the young family back to Denmark, where she knew the boys would receive an excellent free state education.

The family had strong artistic traditions both in the visual arts and music and she was encouraged to take up her interest in painting on pre-formed ceramics. At age 19, she applied to the Copenhagen College of Art and Crafts and was accepted, studying there for 3 years. After this, she worked with Gerhard Nielsen at the Holbaek Pottery for a year and then moved on to working at Saxbo for Natalie Krebs. In 1938, Agnete married Askel Hoy, an architect, 7 years her senior, and it was this surname she would use for the rest of her career. Within a few months, the marriage failed, Agnete applied for a formal separation and left Denmark, accompanied by her mother in 1939. She planned to visit her two brothers who had returned to England to work, a few years earlier. It was during this visit that war broke out and they were unable to return to Denmark.

Needing work, Agnete went to stay with her brother Svend, who lived in the centre of the pottery manufacturing industry at Stoke-on-Trent and secured work with Bullers Ltd, who produced electrical insulators. Later she became head of their small art studio and continued in this position until the studio was closed in 1952. After this, she moved down to London to be with her second husband, Harry Bohrer, whom she married in 1943. Once in London, Agnete applied to the Doulton Lambeth studio, and was appointed head of the studio until its closure in 1956.

The next year, Agnete set up her own studio in her home at Acton, West London, and in the early 1960s began lecturing and teaching at various art colleges, including Hammersmith, Farnham and Richmond. Her husband Harry died in 1986. From the early 1990s onwards Agnete suffered from a disabling illness; she died at West Middlesex Hospital, Isleworth on 1 April 2000.

== Work ==
In 1939, Agnete and her mother left Denmark on holiday to visit her brothers who had returned to England a few years earlier to work. With the onset of war, they were unexpectedly exiled in England and Agnete went to Liverpool to be near her younger brother, Eric, who was working in the food canning industry. Unable to find suitable employment there, she decided to join her other brother Svend, who lived and worked in the heart of the pottery manufacturing area of Stoke-on-Trent and look for a pottery-based job there. She gained a job with Bullers Ltd. in Milton as head of the art studio. This factory produced porcelain insulators for the electricity industry, and had for a few years also operated a small art studio. Agnete set about consolidating and expanding this studio and began by producing ideas for 'oven to tableware', something that was virtually unheard of at that time.

Many of her pots were experimental in nature and with no specific brief or restraint on her ideas, some one-off ceramics were produced, as well as designs for mass production. It was Bullers' intention to sell these wares to Heals in London and so when there were enough prototypes ready, Agnete herself went to see the Heals buyers. They liked the pots but immediately asked her to produce a range of porcelain animal models in similar colours, explaining that there was a market for such items in the US.

As the confidence of the directors at Bullers increased she was allowed to choose assistants for the studio. The first one to arrive on the recommendation of Gordon Forsyth in 1943 was James Rushton, 15 years old, who was employed in the first place to be a modeller and caster. Later they were joined by Elsie Forrester and Hilda Hind, both described as decorators. The team grew to 10 and included Harold Thomas whom Agnete considered to be the best 'thrower' in Stoke-on-Trent. As soon as the workers had 'proved' their ability, she encouraged them to develop their own styles. Over the years Agnete invited influential studio potters such as Bernard Leach and his son, Michael and Rosemary Wren to visit. The input of visitors added to the general artistic and intellectual atmosphere within the studio.

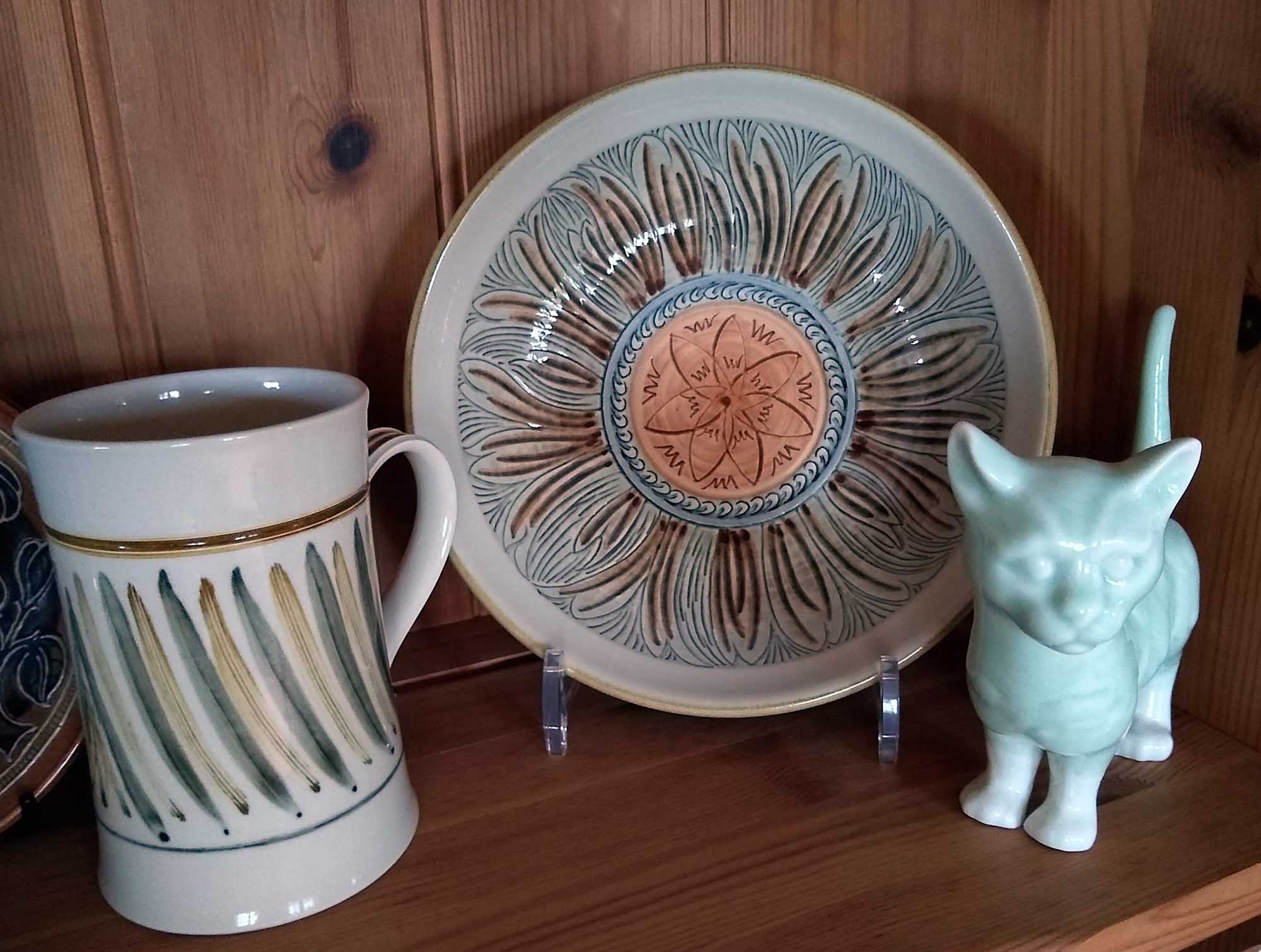
A trio of pots designed by Agnete Hoy for Doulton's of Lambeth

In 1952, Agnete returned to London to be with her husband Harry Bohrer where she took a job with the Royal Doulton Lambeth Studio. The Lambeth Studio had been in existence for over 80 years, though output had been minimal since the advent of WW2. In the aftermath of the 1951 Festival of Britain, managers at Doulton's had decided to revive the production of decorative wares, and under Hoy's direction, the studio would be run along similar lines to Bullers, although little of the work was ever mass-produced, except for the Coronation pieces outlined below. Indeed, many of Hoy's pots were probably unique, a throwback to the earliest days of the Lambeth studio (i.e. the early 1870s) where again, virtually all the output was on a one-off basis, largely produced at the artist's whims. Agnete brought her own style to Lambeth, principally by developing a cream stoneware base and glossy translucent glazes that resembled earthenware more than stoneware. Her decorative techniques varied from painted flower, bird and fruit motifs, to more geometrically decorated pieces, with incised or (rarely) slip-trailed designs. Pieces produced in this period either have her full signature on the base or her monogram in the form of conjoined initials AH. Identical, but unsigned pieces were the work of Helen Walters (later Helen Swain), who marked her own pieces with a 'kiss and dots' mark. There were also two assistants, Doris M. Johnston (b.1906) and Jane Gregory (the latter born in Trowbridge c.1931), who probably used stamped / impressed cyphers or pictograms to identify their work. According to Helen Swain, it was common for Hoy and her assistants to work in a kind of ‘pottery bee’, with Hoy showing the decoration required, and the others copying this on pre-thrown pots. In this way, Swain estimated that perhaps a hundred or so of each given design was produced. (Helen Swain died in 2019, aged 90).

In 1953, Agnete was asked to produce a range of decorative ware to commemorate the Coronation of Queen Elizabeth II. Among the items she produced were a 3-handled loving cup and a tankard, produced in editions of 100 and 500 respectively; just 25 of a smaller variant of the loving cup were also produced. Perhaps one of her best-known pieces from this period is the cat, Pushkin, which was modelled after her own cat; Alexander Pushkin. Only 12 models were made, each with subtly differing decoration. A 'recreation' of the Pushkin model was produced by Doulton's in 2015 to celebrate the company's 200th anniversary. Finished in an allover celadon glaze, and somewhat smaller than the originals, no credit to its original designer was given.

In June 1956, Doulton consolidated their business in Stoke-on-Trent and closed the Lambeth Studio, prompted in part by the passage of the Clean Air Act of the same year. This led Agnete to set up a workshop in her home in Acton. She bought a reasonable size electric kiln and acquired an industrial wheel, similar to the kind she had used at Bullers and Doulton.

Teaching at art colleges in and around London meant that she could use their firing facilities as well as her own. During the late 1950s Agnete, along with many fellow potters, was involved in the establishment of the Craftsmen's Potters Association (CPA). It was here and at many other exhibitions and venues around Britain that her work was shown.
