= Mikael Brandrup =

Danish visual artist

Mikael Brandrup (Mikael B)
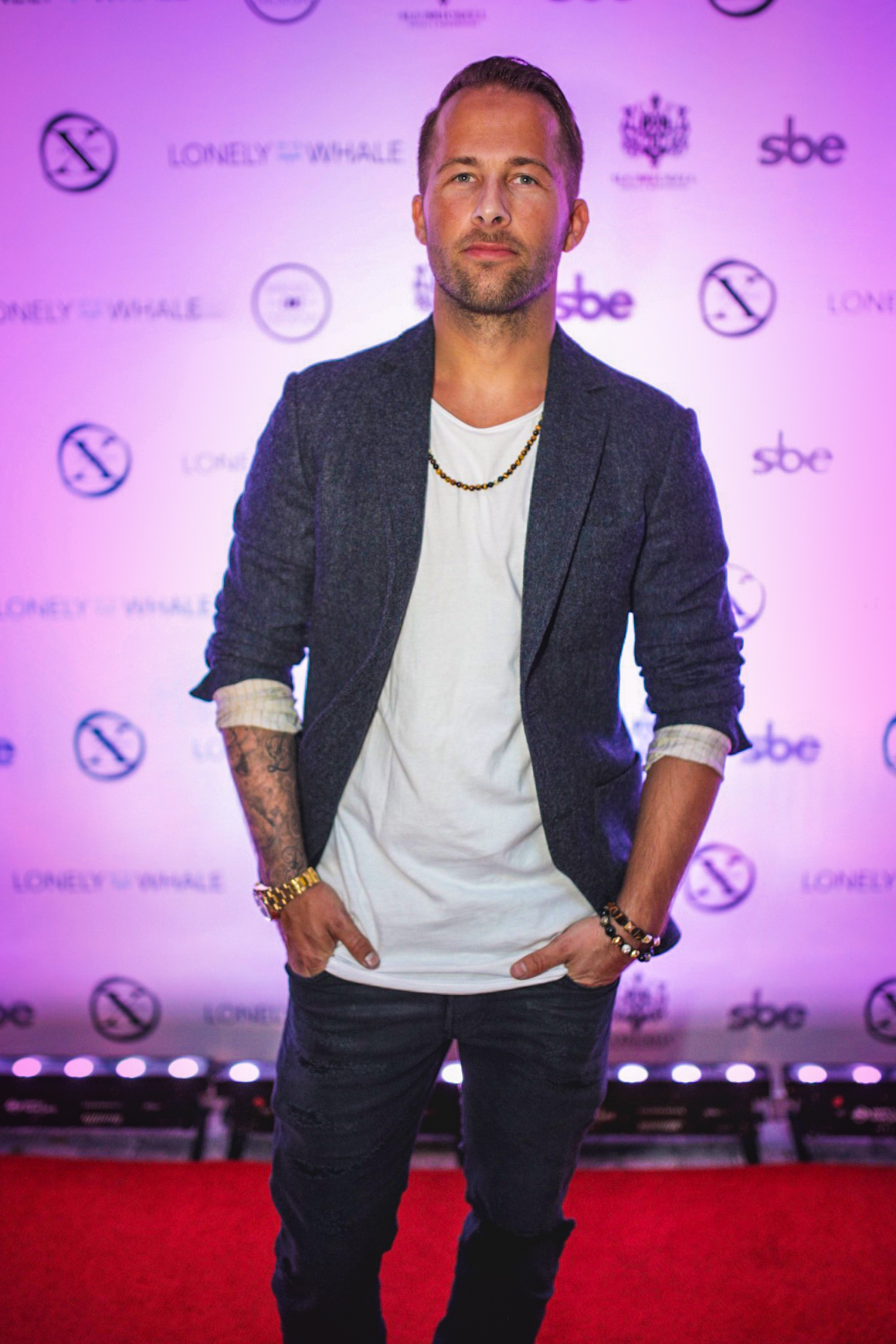
- Mikael Brandrup at SLS Brickwell AWAKE
- Born: June 5, 1984 (age 41); Holbæk, Denmark
- Occupations: Artist, Designer
- Notable work: Vibrant World, Floating Worlds, Dynamic World, Safe Haven (Phillippe Starck sculpture)
- Style: Abstract art
- Movement: Abstract expressionism, graffiti, urban contemporary
- Website: www.mikael-b.com

Mikael Brandrup, also known as Mikael B or "KETS", is a Danish visual artist, graphic designer, and entrepreneur who lives in Los Angeles. Mikael B has exhibited at galleries in Europe and the United States such as Taglialatella Galleries, Gregorio Escalante Gallery, Corey Helford Gallery, CASS Contemporary, WYN317 and Gabba Gallery. He works in both the fine art world and in the urban contemporary genres.

== Early history and graffiti ==
Brandrup grew up in Holbæk, Denmark and went to Københavns Tekniske Skole to study graphic and web design. Although he was always attracted to traditional painting, Brandrup started to work in graffiti lettering when he was 15 years old, installing wood panels in his parents' backyard and covering them with his graffiti name KETS.

== Design ==
In 2008, Brandrup, his twin brother Morten Brandrup and Mickie Storm founded a design agency called Identity Provided, specializing in visual communication, branding, web design and corporate campaigns. Over the course of six years, they created the visual identity for several major companies, including Steen & Strøm Department Store and Chiquita Brands International. In 2014, Identity Provided merged with a large parent design agency in Copenhagen called MeyerBukdahl so Brandrup could devote more time to his fine art.

== Murals and commercial installations ==
In his murals and commercial installations, Brandrup combines the wild style lettering and shapes from graffiti with the graphic sensibility of design, making compositions that are "vibrant and playful yet structured in form." Brandrup attempts to find order and structure within the abstract universe in his work and has attracted the attention of major corporations in the process. He has worked on projects with American Express, LinkedIn, Heineken, Google and Nike, who hired him to paint a 10 x 10 canvas on the Santa Monica Pier surrounding their launch of NBA player Chris Paul's line of sneakers. Brandrup has exhibited his canvas work worldwide and in 2016 had a solo show at Ren Gallery entitled "Dream State" that coincided with World Art Day.

== Collaborations ==
=== Thomas Fryd ===
Mikael Brandrup has collaborated with other artists, including Danish photographer and director Thomas Fryd. For their multimedia show titled "Emerging Alchemy," Mikael B and Fryd worked together on 15 paintings and two sculptures. Fryd took surreal photographs of dynamic human activity, which Mikael B transformed by printing on canvas and adding layers of spray paint and acrylics in his signature style.

=== Bumblebee ===
Los Angeles-based contemporary artist Bumblebee and Mikael B met at an art show at Corey Helford Gallery. As a street artist, Bumblebee is associated with figurative designs, razor-sharp stencils, and a controlled color palette, whereas Mikael B, more aligned with graffiti, is known for his unformed shapes, vibrant colors, and wild-style lettering. The artists decided to collaborate on a series of murals, blending their disparate aesthetics in unexpected ways. The first of these three murals was on an 80 ft wall in South Central LA; the second, a private commission at Google's headquarters in Santa Monica; and the third, an outdoor wall at The Container Yard in the Downtown Arts District, was photographed for the Los Angeles Times.

=== Lonely Whale ===
Mikael B teamed up with the non-profit organization Lonely Whale, founded by Entourage actor Adrian Grenier to raise funds for ocean conservation. The exhibition "Awake" opened at SLS Brickell hotel in tandem with Art Basel Miami on December 7, 2017, and was dedicated to raising awareness of plastic pollution's impact on aquatic life. Lonely Whale benefited from 100 percent of sales, as well as from the online sale of a limited edition print conducted through the artist's website. At the opening reception, Mikael B and Adrian Grenier unveiled Mikael B's custom-painted Philippe Starck duck sculpture on the SLS hotel rooftop.
