= Gustav Skram =

Danish railroad director

Johan Christian Gustav Skram (13 July 1802 – 7 April 1865) was a Danish railroad director. He was the father of Danish writer Erik Skram, the second husband of Norwegian writer Amalie Skram.

== Career ==
Skram was the first managing director of the Railway Company of Zealand, from 1844 to 1856, which ran the first railway in Denmark.

== Personal life ==
Skram was born Johan Christian Gustav Schram in Copenhagen, the son of Gerhard Christopher Schram and Anne Johanne Christiane Jørgensen. He was married twice, first to silk trader's daughter Johanne Margaretha Klein from 1826 to her death in 1835. In 1837 he married Justice Counsellor's daughter Ida Johanne Hoë (1814–1886). With his second wife he had the son, writer and journalist Asbjørn Oluf Erik Skram (1847–1923), who, from 1884 to 1900, was married to noted Norwegian writer Amalie Skram. His daughter Henriette Skram, a schoolteacher, became principal of N. Zahle's School.
