= HDMS Peder Skram =

At least three ships of the Royal Danish Navy have been named Peder Skram:

- HDMS Peder Skram (1864), an ironclad built in the 1860s
- HDMS Peder Skram (1908), a coastal defense ship built in the early 1900s
- HDMS Peder Skram (F352), a frigate built in the 1960s
