= Niels Bernhart =

Danish pianist, composer and lecturer

Niels Bernhart (9 May 1946 – 22 April 2008) was a Danish pianist, composer and lecturer.

Born in Holbæk, he was involved in the local entertainment industry for over 40 years and toured for many years around his home country solo or with his own orchestras.

Back in the 1980s he began a collaboration with Jørn Hjorting – first with the radio broadcast "Prøv Lykken" (Try your luck) and in the latest years of the TV channel DK4 where he once a week accompanied and entertained in the program chatting with Jørn Hjorting.

Niels Bernhart owned his own record company, Stardust Musikproduction, primarily released his own material as well as other artists of his genre.

Nephew of Charles W. Thomas.
