= Henriette Skram =

Danish teacher and girls' school principal

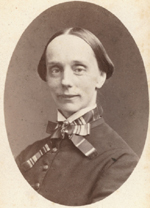
Henriette Skram

Henriette Skram (28 September 1841, Copenhagen — 10 November 1929) was a Danish school teacher. After joining N. Zahle's School as a pupil in 1853, from 1866 she taught there, developing a special interest in English and history. Over the years she took on additional administrative responsibilities until in 1900, after Natalie Zahle's retirement, she became the institution's principal. Recognized as a highly competent teacher and leader, she preserved the school's traditions and constantly upheld the need for special arrangements for girls' schools.

== Early life ==
Born on 28 September 1841 in Copenhagen, Ida Johanne Henriette Skram was the daughter of the railway director Johan Christian Gustav Skram (1802–65) and his wife Ida Johanne Hoë (1814–86). She was one of the family's five children. Her younger sister Emma also became a teacher at N. Zahle's School while her younger brother Erik (1847–1923) was a successful novelist. Raised in a prosperous but unhappy upper-class family, she first spent a year in a small German school before attending Susette Mariboe's Dannekvindeskolen from 1848 until it closed in 1853. She then moved with most of the girls from Dannekvindeskole to N. Zahle's School where she soon started teaching the younger pupils. In 1859 she passed the private teachers' examination and the following year left her mother and siblings to move into Zahle's home as her third foster child. In 1866, she passed the head of school examination.

== Career ==
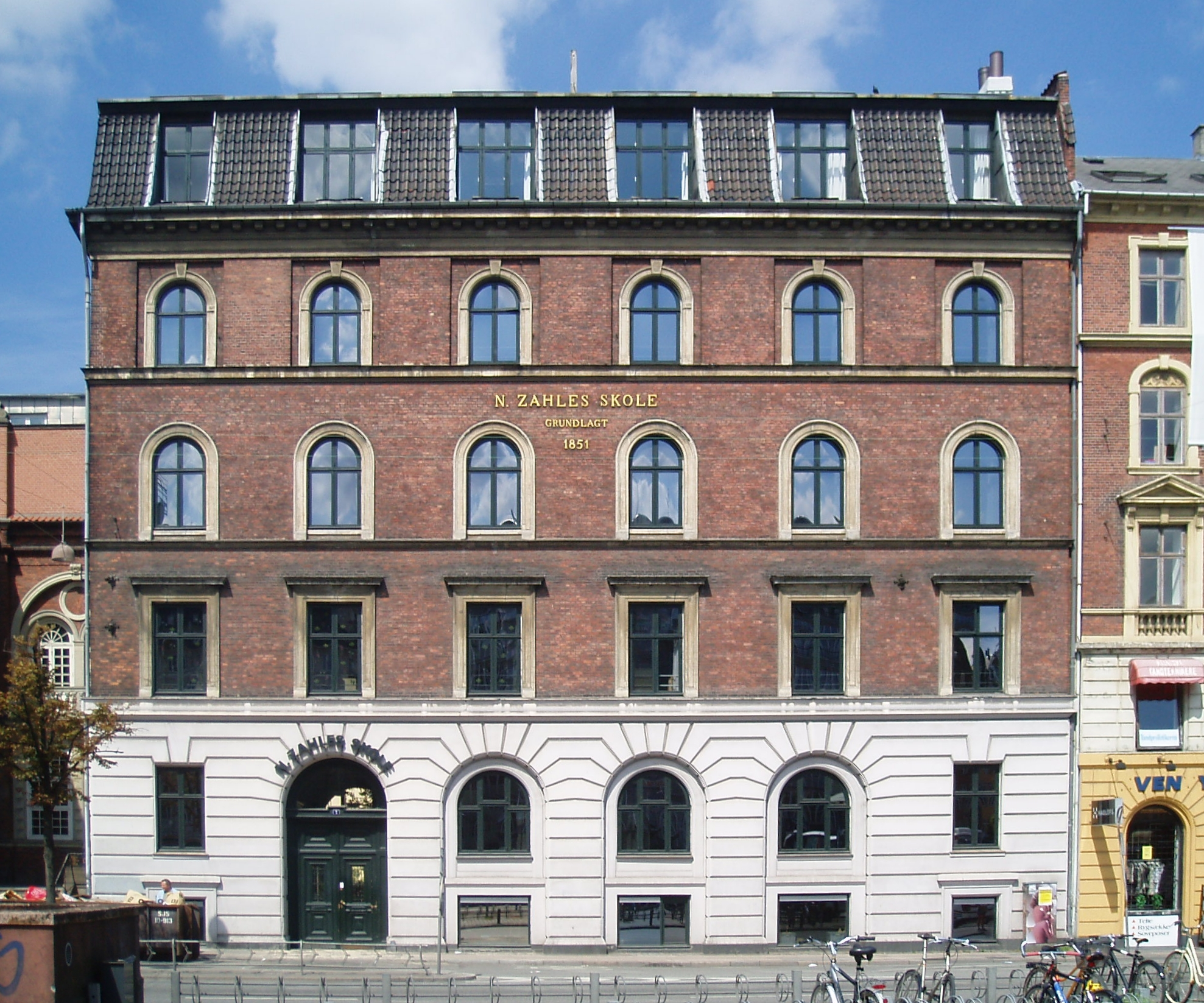
N. Zahle's School

From the early 1860s. Skram took on an increasing number of teaching assignments at N. Zahle's School. Initially she taught a wide range of subjects but soon specialized in English and history. After making a study trip to England, in 1871 she published the textbook Engelsk Læsebog, udgiven med særligt Hensyn til Undervisningen i Pigeskoler (English Reader with Special Attention to Teaching in Girls' Schools). With history as her main interest, she became known as the school's "jewel" (smykke) and was widely regarded as one of the outstanding communicators of the day. In 1877, she published Forsøg paa en verdenshistorisk Oversigt (Attempt at an Overview of World History).

Convinced that teaching in girls' schools required a special approach, in 1882 she was behind a proposal that girls should not take the general preparatory examination until they were 17 while the minimum age for boys was 15. In 1905, she created a special examination for teachers in girls' schools while in 1907, thanks to her efforts, a special examination for girls was adopted. In 1903 she wrote, "We are something other than an imitation of a boys' school, we are a girls' school, we wish to remain a girls' school, we wish to be treated as a girls' school."

Over the years, Skram took on additional administrative responsibilities with considerable success until in 1900, after Natalie Zahle's retirement, she became the school's headmistress. Although her approach differed from Zahle's, she became a respected leader and managed to preserve the school's special status and its tradition of inclusiveness. In 1913, aged 72, she retired from the school to concentrate on writing and lecturing. In 1921, she was honoured with the Gold Medal of Merit.

Henriette Skram died in Copenhagen on 10 November 1929 and was buried in the Garrison Cemetery.
