= HDMS Peder Skram (1864) =

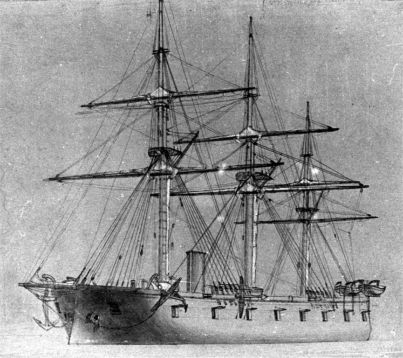

History

Denmark
- Name: Peder Skram
- Namesake: Admiral Peder Skram
- Builder: Naval Dockyard, Copenhagen
- Laid down: 19 May 1859
- Launched: 18 October 1864
- Completed: 15 August 1866
- Out of service: 7 December 1885
- Reclassified: Accommodation ship
- Fate: Scrapped, 1897

General characteristics
- Type: Armored frigate
- Displacement: 3,373 long tons (3,427 t)
- Length: 226 ft 3 in (69.0 m) (p/p)
- Beam: 49 ft 6 in (15.1 m)
- Draft: 21 ft 8 in (6.6 m)
- Installed power: 1,680 ihp (1,250 kW); 4 boilers
- Propulsion: 1 shaft, 1 steam engine
- Sail plan: Ship rigged
- Speed: 11 knots (20 km/h; 13 mph)
- Range: 1,500 nmi (2,800 km; 1,700 mi) at 10 knots (19 km/h; 12 mph)
- Complement: 450
- Armament: 6 × 8-inch (203 mm) rifled muzzle-loading (RML) guns; 8 × 24- or 26-pounder (RML) guns
- Armour: Belt: 127 mm (5.0 in); Battery: 114 mm (4.5 in)

The Danish ironclad Peder Skram was originally laid down as a wooden steam frigate for the Royal Danish Navy, but was converted to an armored frigate while under construction in the early 1860s. She had an uneventful career before she was stricken from the Navy List on 7 December 1885. The ship was converted into an accommodation ship that year and was broken up in 1897.

== Description ==
Peder Skram was 226 feet 3 inches (69.0 m) long between perpendiculars, had a beam of 49 feet 6 inches (15.1 m) and a draft of 21 feet 8 inches (6.6 m). The ship displaced 3,373 long tons (3,427 t). She had a single steam engine that drove her propeller using steam provided by four boilers that exhausted through a single funnel. The engine, built by Baumgarten & Burmeister, produced a total of 1,680 indicated horsepower (1,250 kW) which gave the ship a speed of 11.7 knots (21.7 km/h; 13.5 mph). The ship had a range of 1,500 nautical miles (2,800 km; 1,700 mi) at a speed of 10 knots (19 km/h; 12 mph). For long-distance travel, Peder Skram was fitted with three masts and ship rigged. Her crew numbered between 450 and 530 officers and crewmen.

The ship was armed with six 8-inch (203 mm) and twelve 24- or 26-pounder rifled muzzle-loading (RML) guns. She was later rearmed with eight 8-inch and eight 6-inch (152 mm) RML guns. Peder Skram had a wrought-iron waterline armor belt 4.5 inches (110 mm) thick. Her battery was protected by 5-inch (127 mm) armor plates.

== Construction and career ==
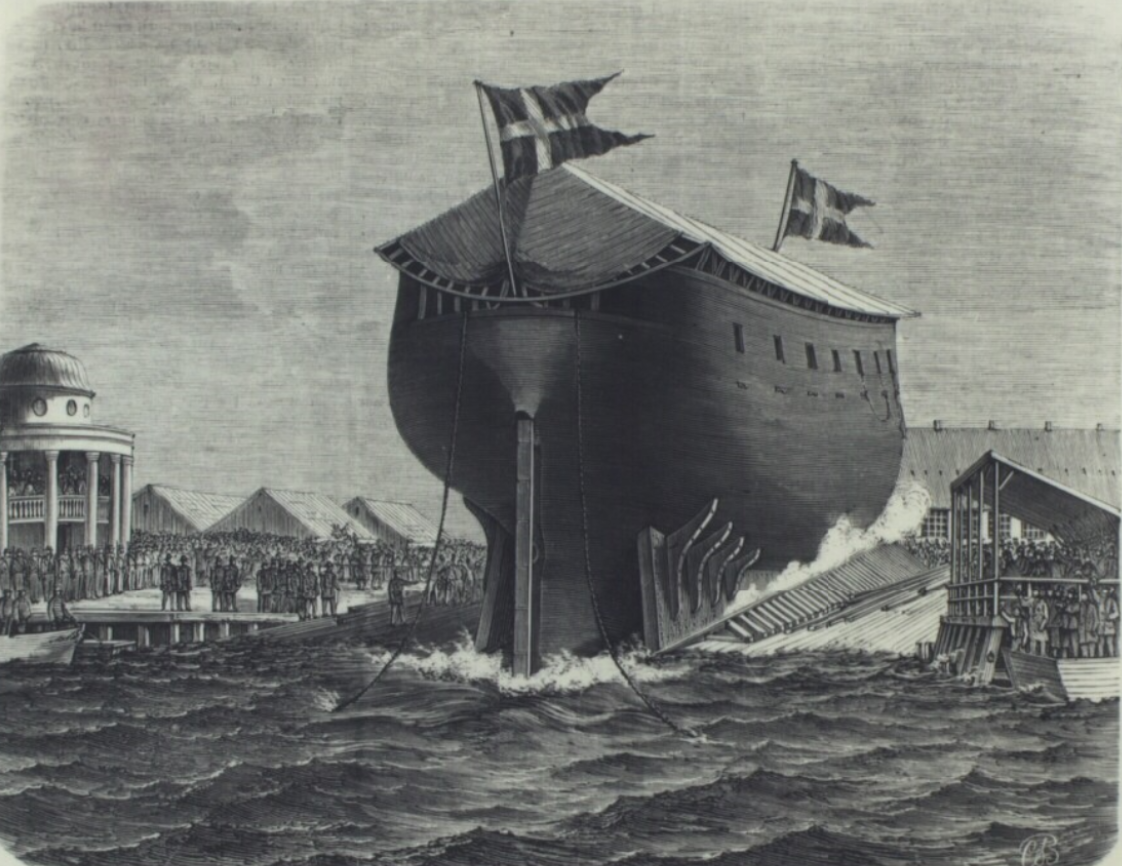
der Skram is launched on 28 October 1864.

Peder Skram was built by the Royal shipyard in Copenhagen. She was laid down as a wooden steam frigate on 19 May 1859 and was converted into armored frigate in 1862 while still under construction. She was launched on 18 October 1864 and commissioned on 15 August 1866. The ship was refitted in 1876–78 and stricken on 7 December 1885. Peder Skram was hulked and converted into an accommodation ship until she was broken up for scrap in 1897.
