= Sparekassen Sjælland =

Danish bank

- Company type: Publicly traded Aktieselskab
- Traded as: Nasdaq Copenhagen: SPKSJF
- Industry: Financial services
- Founded: 1825
- Defunct: 24 November 2015
- Headquarters: Holbæk, Denmark
- Key people: Lars Petersson (CEO), Thomas Kullegaard (Chairman)
- Products: Retail, commercial and private banking
- Number of employees: +600
- Website: www.spks.dk

Sparekassen Sjælland-Fyn (Nasdaq Copenhagen: SPKSJF) is a bank headquartered in Holbæk, Denmark.

== History ==
Sparekassen Sjælland-Fyn traces its history back to the foundation of Holbæk Amts Sparekassen on 23 December 1825 at Frydendal Manor. The estate's owner, Jacob Frederik van Deurs, was the first chairman of the board. He was succeeded by Chr. v. Barner from Kalundborg Slots Ladegård in 1829.

The current bank is the result of a series of mergers between local saving banks on Zealand and the bank has formerly operated under names such as Sparekassen Holbæk, Sparekassen for Holbæk og Omegn, Sparekassen Nordvestsjælland and Sparekassen Vestsjælland. The name Sparekassen Sjælland was introduced in 2001. In 2010, Sparekassen Sjælland merged with Næstved-based Max Bank. Sparekassen Sjælland-Fyn was listed on the Copenhagen Stock Exchange on 4 December 2015.

== Company ==
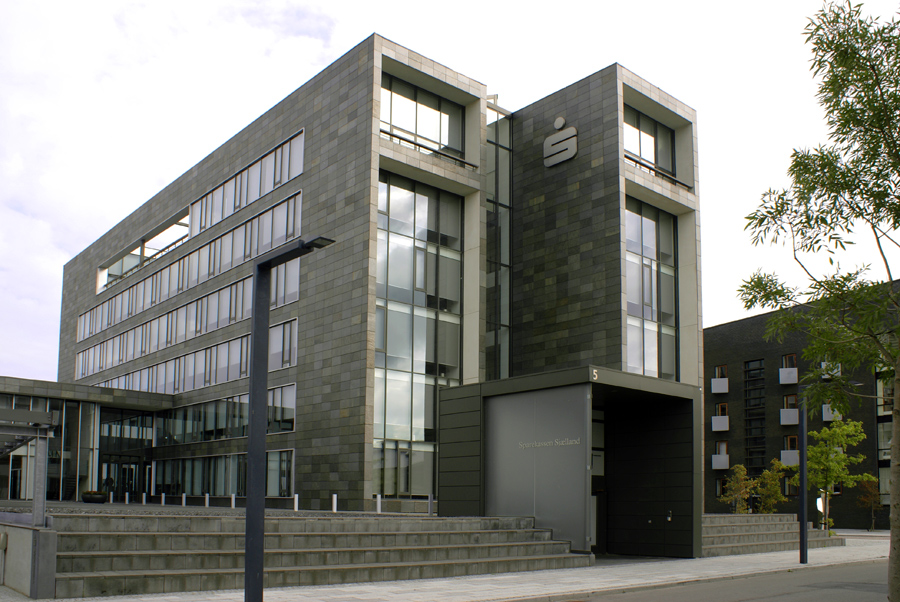
Main office in Holbæk, Denmark

The current headquarters was built in 2003 (according to BBR) and are located on the harbourfront in Holbæk. It houses approximately 150 employees. The bank has 45 branches (2020) across Zealand and Funen.

Sparekassen Sjælland had a subsidiary, Sparekassen Fyn, which operated under its own name on the island of Funen (Danish: Fyn). It was created when Sparekassen Sjælland acquired Faaborg Sparekasse in 2013. Following an IT merger in 2016, the two banks operate under the same name: Sparekassen Sjælland-Fyn.
