= N. Zahle's School =

N. Zahles Skole
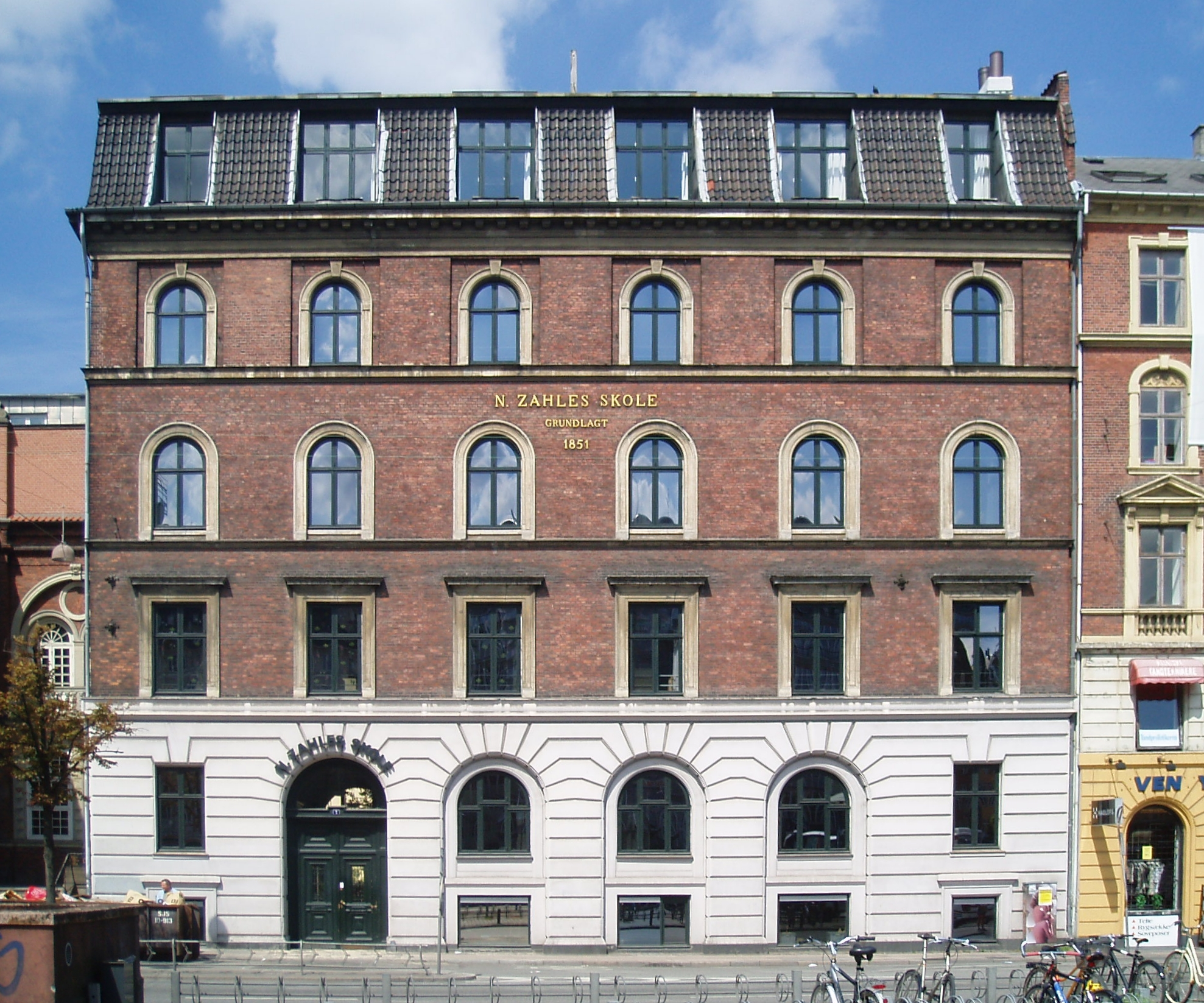

Location
- Copenhagen, Denmark
- Coordinates: 55.6825°N 12.5698°E

Information
- Type: Private primary school and gymnasium
- Founded: 1851; 175 years ago
- Website: www.zahles.dk

N. Zahle's School (Danish: N. Zahles Skole) is a private school located on Nørre Voldgade in Copenhagen, Denmark. Named after its founder, Natalie Zahle (1827–1913), it now consists of two independently run primary schools and a Gymnasium.

== History ==
On 1 May 1851, Natalie Zahle launched a programme for the training of female private teachers. In 1844, Zahle took over Sofie Foersom's school at Gammel Strand 38 (then No. 14, Strand Quarter). She resided in the rear wing of Gammel Strand 46.

It developed into a proper School of education in 1861 after women had been given access to teach at Danish public schools in 1859. The gymnasium traces its history back to a programme that was introduced in 1877. The school now known as N. Zahles Seminarieskole was founded in 1895 as a preparatory school for the teachers college. The schools were opened to boys in the 1950s. The teachers' college was disjoined from the institution in 2002 and is now part of University College of Copenhagen.

The school's first home was a small apartment in the no longer existing street Hummergade. It later moved to larger premises on Gammel Strand and finally to a new building on Nørre Voldgade in 1877. The school later took over several of the neighbouring buildings.

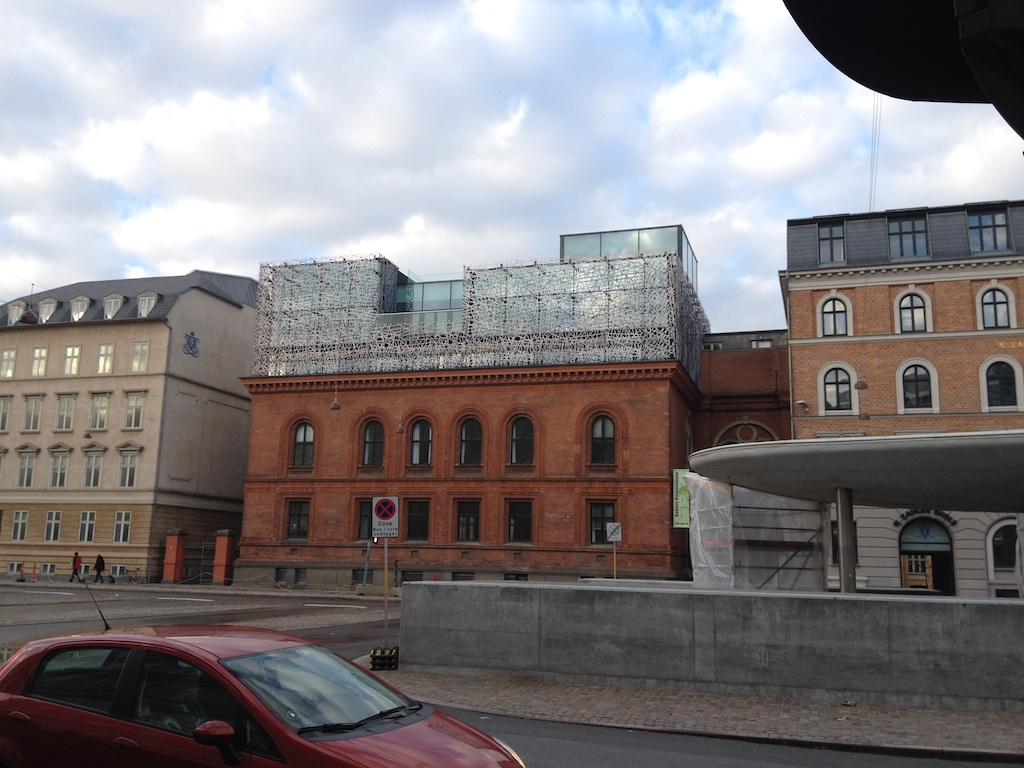
N. Zahles Gymnasium with the glazed extension

== Buildings ==
Nørre Voldgade 7 was designed by Frederik Bøttger (1838–1920) and completed in 1877.

The adjoining building at No. 5 originally housed Østifternes Kreditforening and later the insurance company Forsikringsselskabet National. This building was designed by Valdemar Ingemann (1840–1911) and is from 1875. The building which houses N. Zahles Seminarieskole faces the square Israels Plads on the other side of the block. The building was expanded with an extra floor by Rørbæk & Møller Arkitekter in 2012.

== Alumni ==
Notable alumni have included:

- Henriette Skram (1841–1929), from 1900 the school's principal
- Anna Hude (1858–1934)
- Kristine Marie Jensen (1858-1923)
- Karen Ankersted (1859–1921)
- Ingrid Jespersen (1867–1938)
- Ellen Hørup (1871-1953)
- Ellen Nielsen (1871-1960)
- Marie Krogh (1874-1943)
- Lis Jacobsen (1882-1961)
- Margrethe II of Denmark (born 1940)
- Princess Benedikte of Denmark (born 1944)
- Queen Anne-Marie of Greece (born 1946)
- Sigrid Friis Proschowsky (born 1994)
