= Ellen Nielsen =

Chinese missionary and educator

- Born: Ellen Kirstine Marie Nielsen; 17 July 1871; Bregninge, Holbæk Municipality, Region Sjælland, Denmark
- Died: 25 July 1960 (aged 89); Dagushan (Chinese: 大孤山镇), Qianshan District, China
- Other names: Nie Lexin, Nie Yuming
- Occupations: teacher, missionary
- Years active: 1893–1950

Ellen Nielsen (Chinese: 艾伦·聂乐信 or more commonly Chinese: 聂乐信, 17 July 1871 – 25 July 1960) was a Danish-born teacher and missionary who moved to Manchuria, took Chinese citizenship and worked to establish schools and provide social services in the Qianshan District. She founded the first kindergarten, a girls' elementary school, as well as a middle school, high school and normal school. Providing employment, she established a manufacturing center where women produced textile goods and men learned agricultural skills. Paying workers from her own salary, she created a collective village, where the Gushan Apricot was first cultivated by Nielsen. During the Communist Revolution she was arrested and her belongings and the communal lands were confiscated. When they were redistributed she was assisted by villagers to meet the production requirements. Her helpers were arrested and after her death were tried as counter-revolutionaries. She was rehabilitated in 1980 and is now recognized in China for her contributions to the Liaoning Province.

== Early life ==
Ellen Kirstine Marie Nielsen was born on 17 July 1871 in Bregninge, a village in the Holbæk Municipality of the Region Sjælland, Denmark, to Maren Kirstine (née Jensen) and Jørgen Nielsen. Her father was a chimney sweep, who often failed to provide for his family because of his drinking problem. Her mother raised the six children and worked on the farm raising cattle, horses and sheep. Nielsen, the youngest child, often helped her mother and developed a love of the outdoors at an early age. Because of the family's poverty, from the age eight, she worked to earn money to go to school. When her mother died in 1890, she moved to Copenhagen and began working with prostitutes for the Young Women's Christian Association (Danish: Kristelig Forening for Unge Kvinder. Wanting to work as a missionary, Nielsen was referred to the Danish Missionary Society (DMS) by the YWCA board. The DMS had never sent women to the mission field and initially refused to send Nielsen, requiring her to complete her education. With another woman, Kathrine Nielsen, she enrolled in the teacher's preparatory program of the N. Zahle's School. The training also included nursing courses and instruction in Chinese. Upon their graduation in 1897, both women were referred a second time by the YWCA to the DMS board, which agreed to send them to Manchuria as the first missionary women from Denmark.

== Career ==
In 1898, Nielsen arrived in China and was assigned to work at the Missionary Church in Dandong, Liaoning Province providing nursing care at the West Street Clinic. Because of an epidemic at that time, she was sent to Dagushan (Chinese: 大孤山镇), a town lying to the southwest of Dandong, where she saw up to 100 patients per day. There were conflicts with the local residents over the missionaries' refusal to accept Chinese medicine and their religious beliefs. In 1902, Nielsen established an industrial boarding school and began teaching the following year, with three students. She established an admittance policy which rejected any student with bound feet. The school taught girls embroidery skills and then sold the handicrafts produced abroad to fund the institution, as well as providing them with classes in reading, hygiene and religion. Two of her first three students were orphans, whom she had adopted.

Nielsen founded the Chongzheng Girls' Primary School (Chinese: 崇正女子小学) in 1908 and four years later she opened a center for homeless women. The Chongzheng Poverty Relief Center (Chinese: 崇正贫民救济所) trained women in textile and embroidery manufacture. It expanded to include unemployed fathers, teaching them farming skills. Recognizing that many of the women had children, which impacted their ability to work, in 1913 she established the first kindergartens in Manchuria. In the spring of 1920, she built eight homes on the north side of Gushan Mountain, in the Qianshan Mountain Range, to provide for the care of elderly and disabled villagers. Over the next several years, acting as principal of the school, she expanded the curricula to include a middle school, high school and normal school. Deciding that she would live permanently in China, Nielsen gave up her Danish citizenship and applied for Chinese citizenship in 1929, becoming nationalized in 1931 and adopting the Chinese characters 聂乐信 for her name.

Along with her citizenship, Nielsen was allowed to purchase land, and she used funds received from Denmark to create a collective known as Nielsen's Family Village. By 1939, the collective housed more than 300 people; there were 417 students and 18 teachers working in the girls' school from all over Manchuria and North Korea; the poverty center had 370 people enrolled in assistance programs, and there were 175 houses built as part of the collective. Using her salary, she paid each worker seven dollars a month in addition to sharing with them the crop yields and livestock, as well as providing free schooling for their children. She also purchased property on Ludao Island to give the workers a place where they could take holidays.

In 1942, during the Japanese invasion of Manchuria, they overtook the school, changing the name to Dagushan National University of Higher Education. At the end of the Second Sino-Japanese War, the Communist Revolution began and several missionaries left the area in 1946. In 1947, the Communists arrived in Dagushan and seized Nielsen's personal belongings, as well as the land and properties. She was placed under house arrest and at her trial was convicted of being a landlord. Her two Danish employees, Nanny Brostrøm and Astrid Poulsen were jailed, and her Chinese employees were sent to work camps, leaving the elderly tenants to fend for themselves. After fourteen days, the Danish women were released and returned to Denmark. Most of the Chinese employees died in the camps. Nielsen refused to leave, because she was a Chinese citizen and had a responsibility to care for the villagers. When the communist administrators took over the village, they seized the church school, closed the factory and poor relief agency, and allocated the land and houses to other workers.

In 1949, the new regime promised religious freedom and the church building, four cows, an orchard and a pond were returned to Nielsen. She tried to reorganize the community and revive the church, but her hopes were short-lived when another wave of denunciations was prompted by the government and she was branded as an imperialist. By 1950, Nielsen was the only Danish missionary remaining in China and was forced to live in a small basement room. A faithful helper, Wang Chengren, assisted her in selling milk to meet her production quotas. Neighbors assisted her as she aged and lost her sight, Wang was arrested in 1959 and charged with assisting Nielsen, and then in February 1960, she fell, breaking her arms.

== Death and legacy ==
Nielsen died on 25 July 1960 at her home in Dagushan. Church members buried her at the foot of Gushan Mountain. Five days after her death, Wang was convicted of being a counter-revolutionary and was sentenced to 15 years in prison. In 1980, she, along with other missionaries, were rehabilitated and a decade later, she was recognized by the authorities in Dagushan for her contributions to the area. The Gushan Apricot, which is now a regional delicacy, was grafted from the yellow apricots Nielsen imported from Denmark and grew at the collective.
