= Boozt =

Nordic multi-brand online department store

Boozt Fashion AB
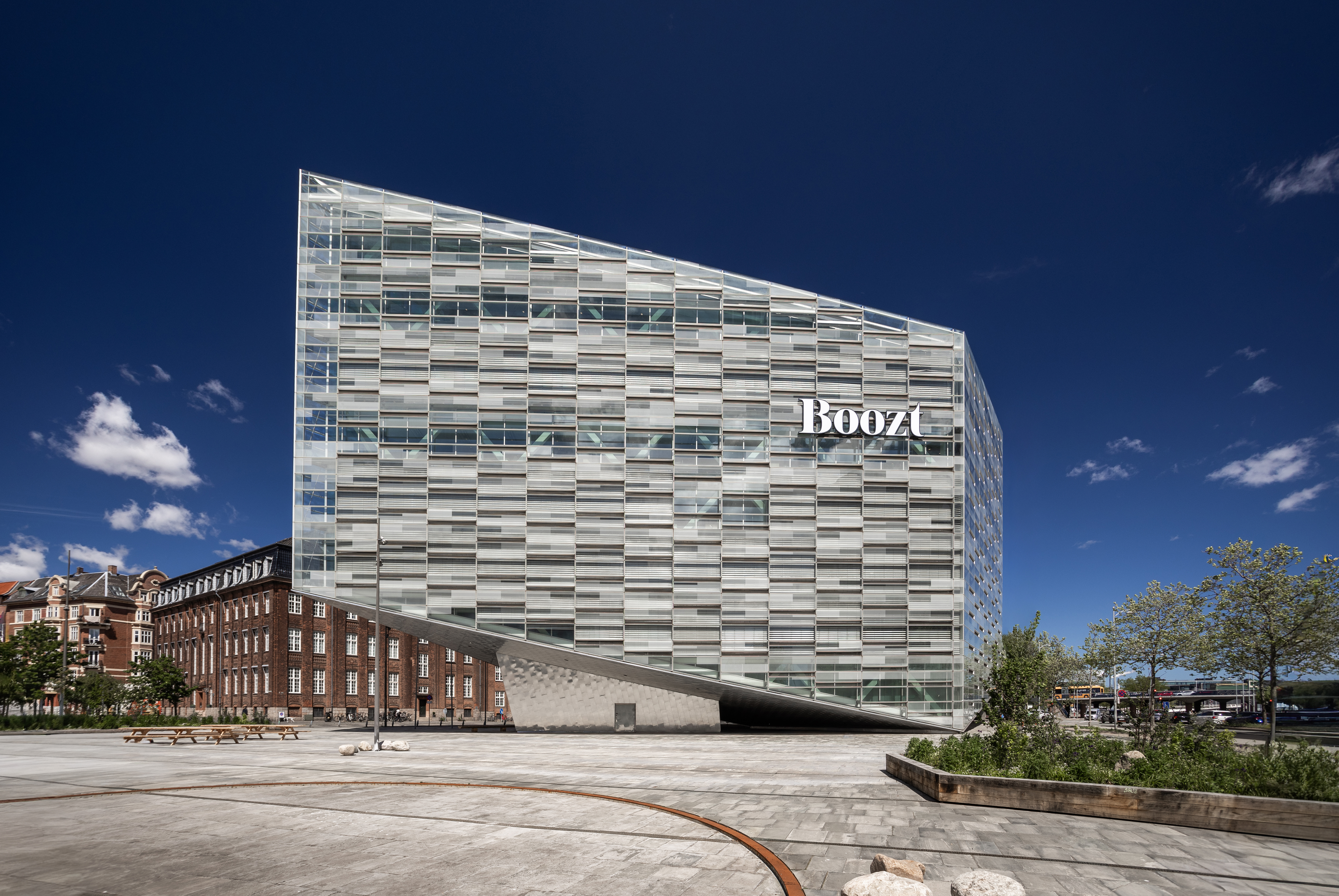
- Trade name: Boozt
- Type: Public
- ISIN: SE0009888738
- Industry: Retail
- Founded: 2007; 19 years ago
- Headquarters: Copenhagen, Denmark
- Area served: Nordic countries and parts of Western Europe
- Key people: Hermann Haraldsson (CEO)
- Owner: Boozt AB
- Number of employees: 1,200 (2023)
- Website: www.boozt.com

Boozt (Boozt Fashion AB) is a Nordic multi-brand online department store founded in 2007 and headquartered in Copenhagen, Denmark. The company sells its products across several European countries. It is publicly traded on the Nasdaq Stockholm and Nasdaq Copenhagen stock exchanges.

== History ==
Boozt was founded in 2007. The company assumed its current form in 2011 with the launch of the Boozt.com website and the establishment of a multi-brand online clothing store.

Its main initial shareholders included the shoe manufacturer Ecco, the private equity firm Sunstone Capital, and the Norwegian fund Verdane.

The company experienced significant growth during its early years, leading to its initial public offering on the Nasdaq Stockholm en 2017 and subsequent public offering on the Nasdaq Copenhagen stock exchanges in 2020. In the same year, it expanded its product range to include cosmetics alongside clothing. Initially focused on fashion, Boozt gradually developed into a multi-brand online department store.

In 2023, Boozt blocked around 42,000 customers due to excessive returns, stating that such practices are harmful both to the business and the environment. In 2024, the company reported having blocked nearly 60,000 customer accounts for the same reasons.

== Operations ==
Boozt operates as a multi-brand online department store in several European countries. As of 2022, it was the largest e-commerce company in Sweden, with a turnover of 6.7 billion Swedish kronor, approximately US$600 million at 2022 exchange rates and a net profit of SEK 186 million, approximately US$18 million at 2022 exchange rates.

Until 2026, the company's headquarters were located in Malmö, Sweden. Its warehouse is in Ängelholm, also in Sweden, and is an automated facility with 1,300 robots navigating 1.2 million storage compartments. The warehouse covers 88,000 square meters, employs 500 people, and handles over 10 million distinct items. In 2026, the company's headquarters moved to Copenhagen, Denmark.

Boozt has more than 1,200 employees. The Dane Hermann Haraldsson has served as CEO since 2011, and the Dane Michael Bjergby has been CFO since 2025. The typical Boozt customer is a woman aged 35–50 who shops for herself and other members of her family.

The company has been a partner of the Stockholm School of Economics since 2023.
