= Jyderup railway station =

Railway station in Northwest Zealand, Denmark

Jyderup
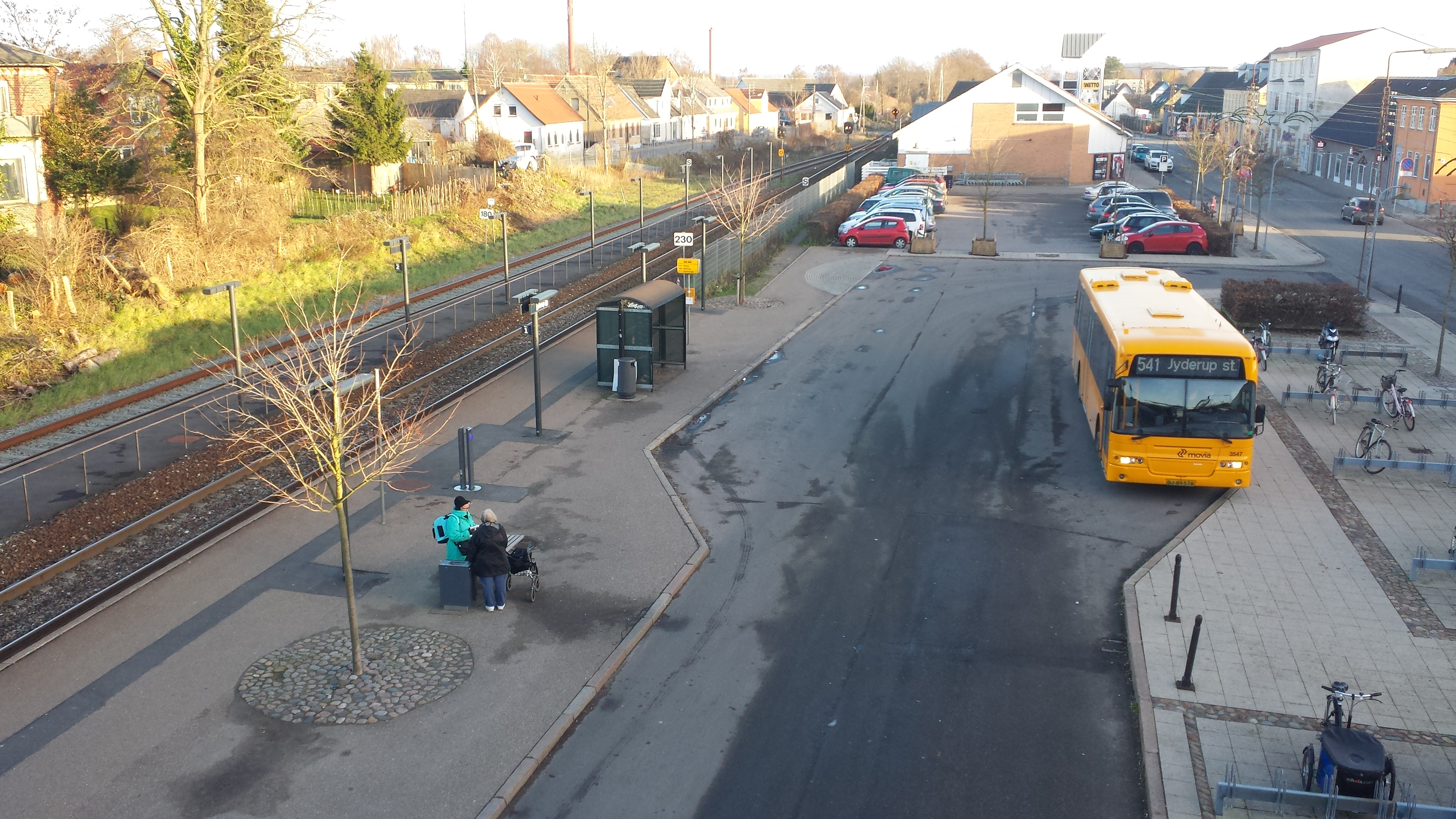
- Jyderup station in 2013

General information
- Location: Skarridsøgade 38; 4450 Jyderup; Holbæk Municipality; Denmark
- Coordinates: 55°39′37.00″N 11°23′52.76″E
- Elevation: 27.3 metres (90 ft)
- Owner: DSB (station infrastructure); Banedanmark (rail infrastructure)
- Line: Northwest Line
- Platforms: 2
- Tracks: 2
- Train operators: DSB

Construction
- Architect: Niels Peder Christian Holsøe

Other information
- Station code: Jy
- Website: Official website

History
- Opened: December 30, 1874; 151 years ago

Services
Preceding station	DSB	Following station
Mørkøv towards Østerport	Copenhagen–Kalundborg Regional train	Svebølle towards Kalundborg
Location

Jyderup railway station is a railway station serving the railway town of Jyderup between the cities of Holbæk and Kalundborg on the island of Zealand, Denmark. The station is located in the southwestern part of the town by its main artery Skarridsøgade, a short distance from the Skarresø lake.

Jyderup railway station is situated on the Northwest Line from Roskilde to Kalundborg. The station opened in 1874. It offers regional rail services to Kalundborg, Holbæk, Roskilde and Copenhagen operated by the national railway company DSB.

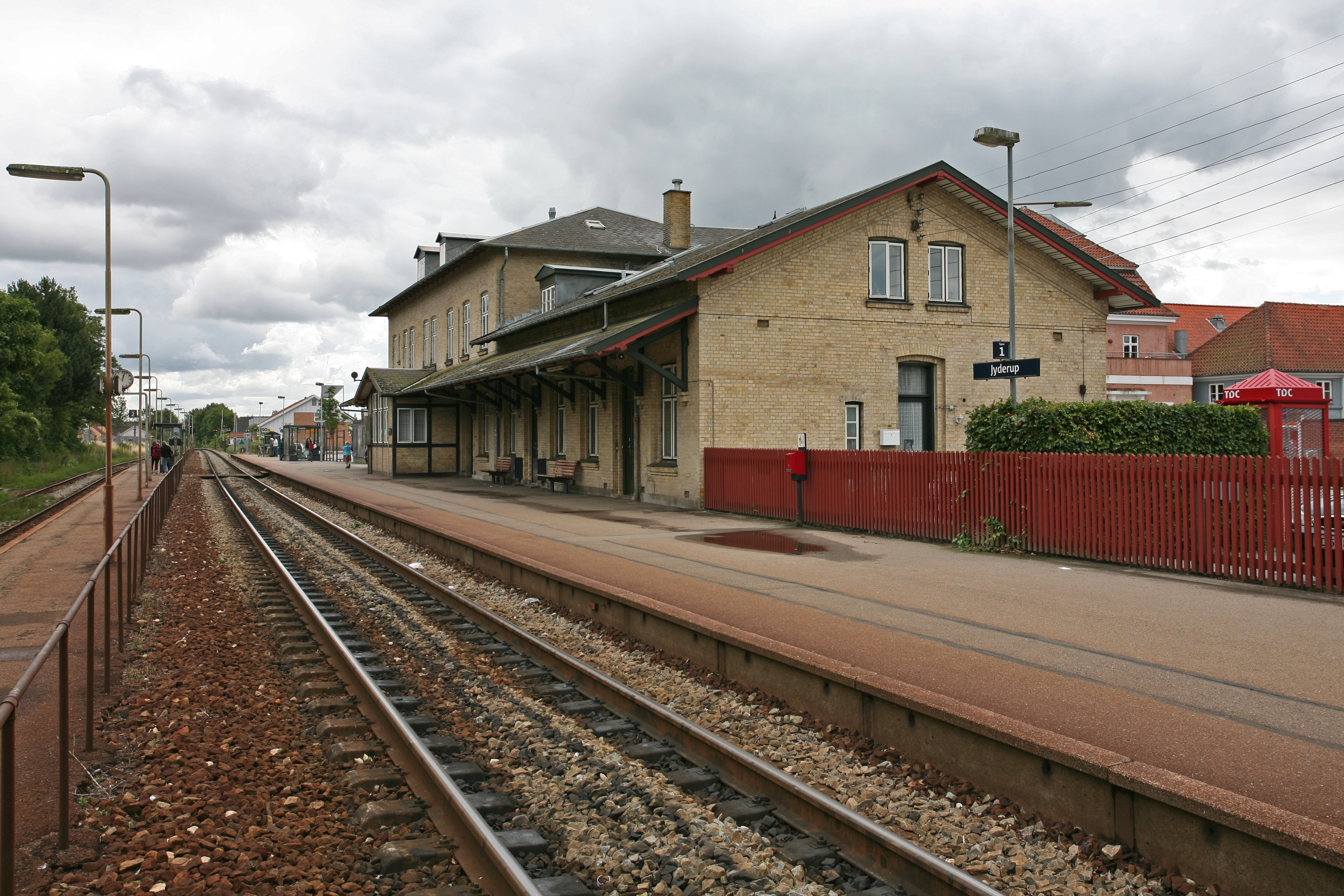
Jyderup station in 2008.

== History ==
Jyderup railway station opened as one of the original intermediate stations on the Northwest Line between Roskilde and Kalundborg which opened on 30 December 1874. The station opened in opened fields, approximately 2 km southwest of the original village of Jyderup, located by the church. After the opening of the railway line, a railway town developed around the station. For many years the village and the railway town were separated, but today the two parts have grown together, although still separated by the road Skovvejen, which creates a northern and a southern part of the town.

== Architecture ==
The original station building from 1874 was built to designs by the Danish architect Niels Peder Christian Holsøe (1826–1895), known for the numerous railway stations he designed across Denmark in his capacity of head architect of the Danish State Railways.

== Services ==
The station offers frequent regional rail services to Kalundborg, Holbæk, Roskilde and Copenhagen operated by the national railway company DSB.

== See also ==
- List of railway stations in Denmark
- Rail transport in Denmark
- History of rail transport in Denmark
- Transport in Denmark
