= Svebølle railway station =

Railway station in Northwest Zealand, Denmark

Svebølle
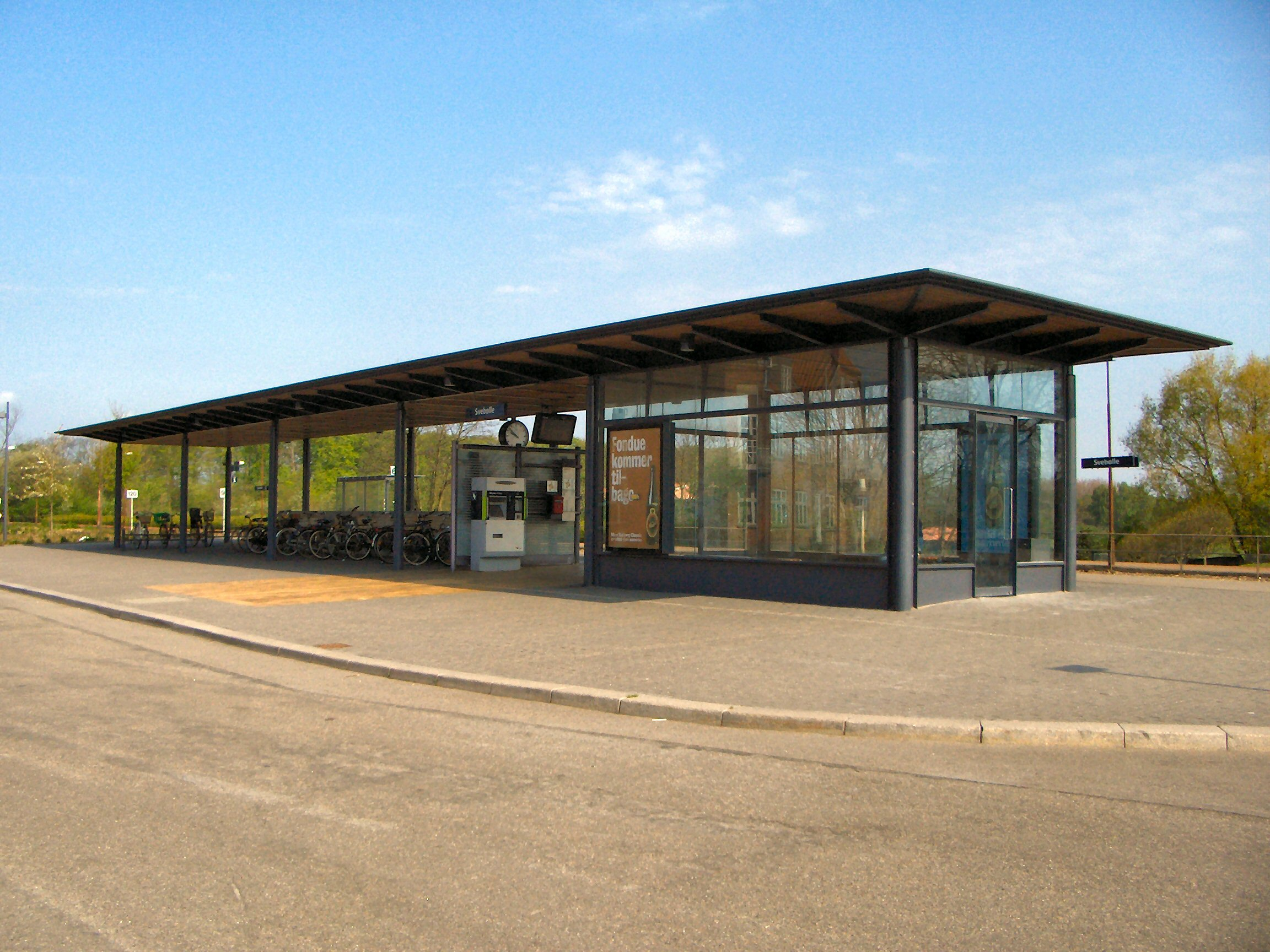
- Svebølle station in 2008

General information
- Location: Jernbanevej 13; 4470 Svebølle; Kalundborg Municipality; Denmark
- Coordinates: 55°39′8.40″N 11°17′30.23″E
- Elevation: 14.5 metres (48 ft)
- Owner: DSB (station infrastructure); Banedanmark (rail infrastructure)
- Line: Northwest Line
- Platforms: 2
- Tracks: 2
- Train operators: DSB

Construction
- Architect: Niels Peder Christian Holsøe

Other information
- Station code: Se
- Website: Official website

History
- Opened: December 30, 1874; 151 years ago

Services
Preceding station	DSB	Following station
Jyderup towards Østerport	Copenhagen–Kalundborg Regional train	Kalundborg East towards Kalundborg
Location

Svebølle railway station is a railway station serving the railway town of Svebølle east of the city of Kalundborg on the island of Zealand, Denmark.

Svebølle railway station is situated on the Northwest Line from Roskilde to Kalundborg. The station opened in 1874. It offers regional rail services to Kalundborg, Holbæk, Roskilde and Copenhagen operated by the national railway company DSB.

== History ==
Svebølle railway station opened as one of the original intermediate stations on the Northwest Line between Roskilde and Kalundborg which opened on 30 December 1874. The station has been unstaffed since 1974.

== Architecture ==
The original station building from 1874 was designed by the Danish architect Niels Peder Christian Holsøe (1826–1895), known for the numerous railway stations he designed across Denmark in his capacity of head architect of the Danish State Railways. The station building has later been torn down.

== Services ==
The station offers frequent regional rail services to Kalundborg, Holbæk, Roskilde and Copenhagen operated by the national railway company DSB.

== See also ==
- List of railway stations in Denmark
- Rail transport in Denmark
- History of rail transport in Denmark
