= Mørkøv railway station =

Railway station in Northwest Zealand, Denmark

Mørkøv
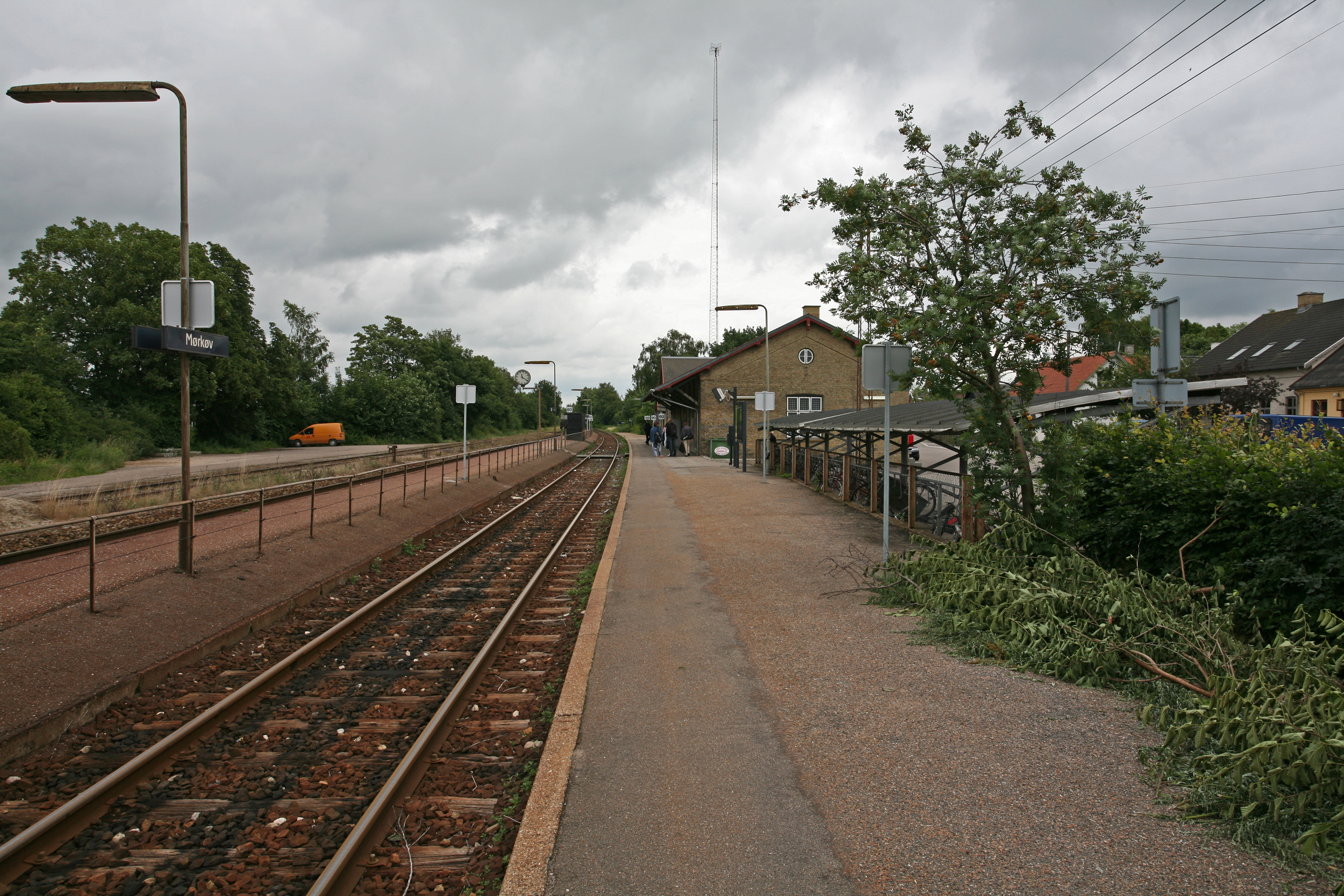
- Mørkøv station in 2007

General information
- Location: Jernbanevej 1; 4440 Mørkøv; Holbæk Municipality; Denmark
- Coordinates: 55°39′16.21″N 11°30′7.50″E
- Elevation: 15.6 metres (51 ft)
- Owner: DSB (station infrastructure); Banedanmark (rail infrastructure)
- Line: Northwest Line
- Platforms: 2
- Tracks: 2
- Train operators: DSB

Construction
- Architect: Niels Peder Christian Holsøe

Other information
- Station code: Mø
- Website: Official website

History
- Opened: December 30, 1874; 151 years ago

Services
| Preceding station | DSB | Following station |
|---|---|---|
| Knabstrup towards Østerport | Copenhagen–Kalundborg Regional train | Jyderup towards Kalundborg |
Location

Mørkøv railway station is a railway station serving the railway town of Mørkøv between the cities of Holbæk and Kalundborg on the island of Zealand, Denmark. The station is located on the northern edge of the town where the railway crosses its main artery Hovedgaden.

Mørkøv railway station is situated on the Northwest Line from Roskilde to Kalundborg. The station opened in 1874. It offers regional rail services to Kalundborg, Holbæk, Roskilde and Copenhagen operated by the national railway company DSB.

== History ==
Mørkøv railway station opened as one of the original intermediate stations on the Northwest Line between Roskilde and Kalundborg which opened on 30 December 1874.

== Architecture ==
The original and still existing station building from 1874 was built to designs by the Danish architect Niels Peder Christian Holsøe (1826–1895), known for the numerous railway stations he designed across Denmark in his capacity of head architect of the Danish State Railways.

== Services ==
The station offers frequent regional rail services to Kalundborg, Holbæk, Roskilde and Copenhagen operated by the national railway company DSB.

== See also ==
- List of railway stations in Denmark
- Rail transport in Denmark
- History of rail transport in Denmark
- Transport in Denmark
