= Vipperød railway station =

Railway station in Zealand, Denmark

Vipperød
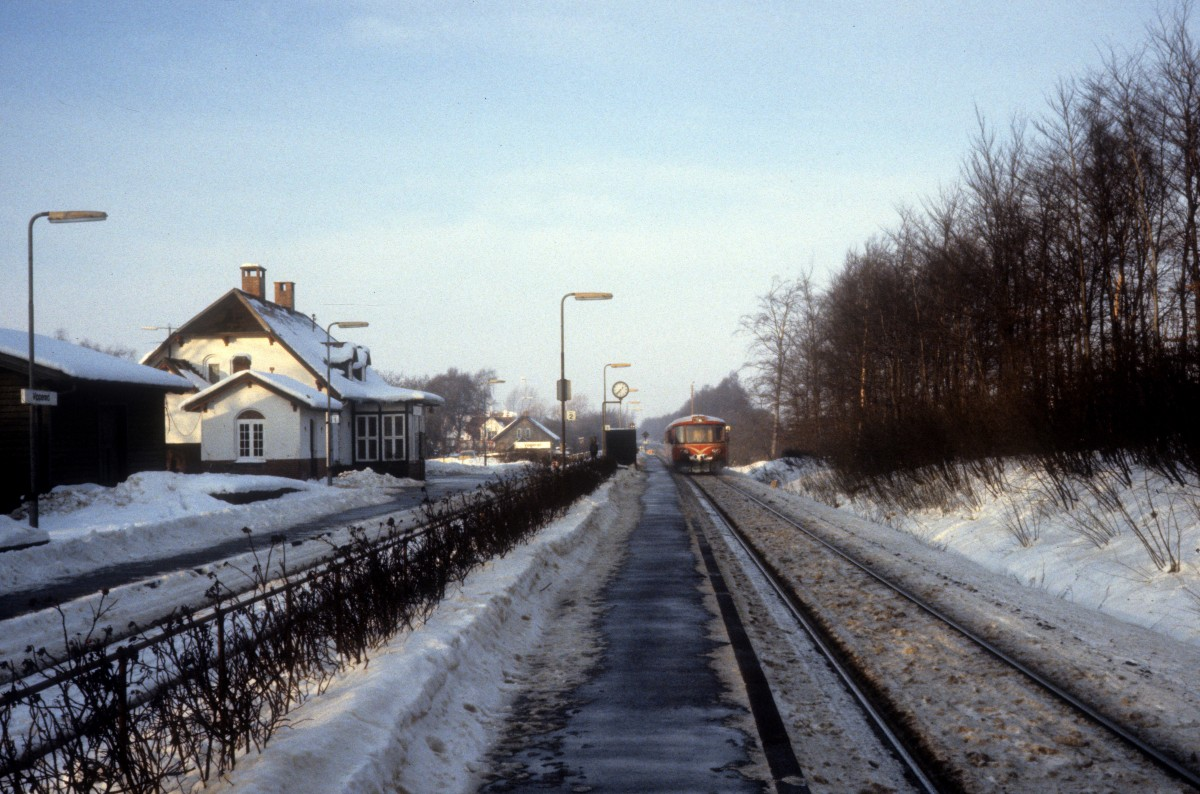
- Vipperød station in 1981

General information
- Location: Stationsvej 3; 4390 Vipperød; Holbæk Municipality; Denmark
- Coordinates: 55°40′0.83″N 11°44′18.61″E
- Elevation: 33.7 metres (111 ft)
- Owner: DSB (station infrastructure); Banedanmark (rail infrastructure)
- Line: Northwest Line
- Platforms: 2
- Tracks: 2
- Train operators: DSB

Construction
- Architect: Heinrich Wenck

Other information
- Station code: Pe
- Website: Official website

History
- Opened: July 1, 1906; 120 years ago

Services
Preceding station	DSB	Following station
Tølløse towards Helsingør	Elsinore–Copenhagen– Roskilde–Holbæk Regional train	Holbæk Terminus
Location

Vipperød railway station is a railway station serving the railway town of Vipperød south of the city of Holbæk on the island of Zealand, Denmark. The station is located in the centre of the town.

Vipperød railway station is situated on the Northwest Line from Roskilde to Kalundborg. The station opened in 1906. It offers regional rail services to Holbæk, Roskilde and Copenhagen operated by the national railway company DSB.

== History ==
Vipperød railway station was not one of the original intermediate stations on the Northwest Line which opened on 30 December 1874. The station opened for passengers on July 1, 1906; 120 years ago.

== Architecture ==
The original and still existing station building was built in 1906 to designs by the Danish architect Heinrich Wenck (1851–1936), known for the numerous railway stations he designed across Denmark in his capacity of head architect of the Danish State Railways.

== Services ==
The station offers frequent regional rail services to Holbæk, Roskilde and Copenhagen operated by the national railway company DSB.

== Gallery ==
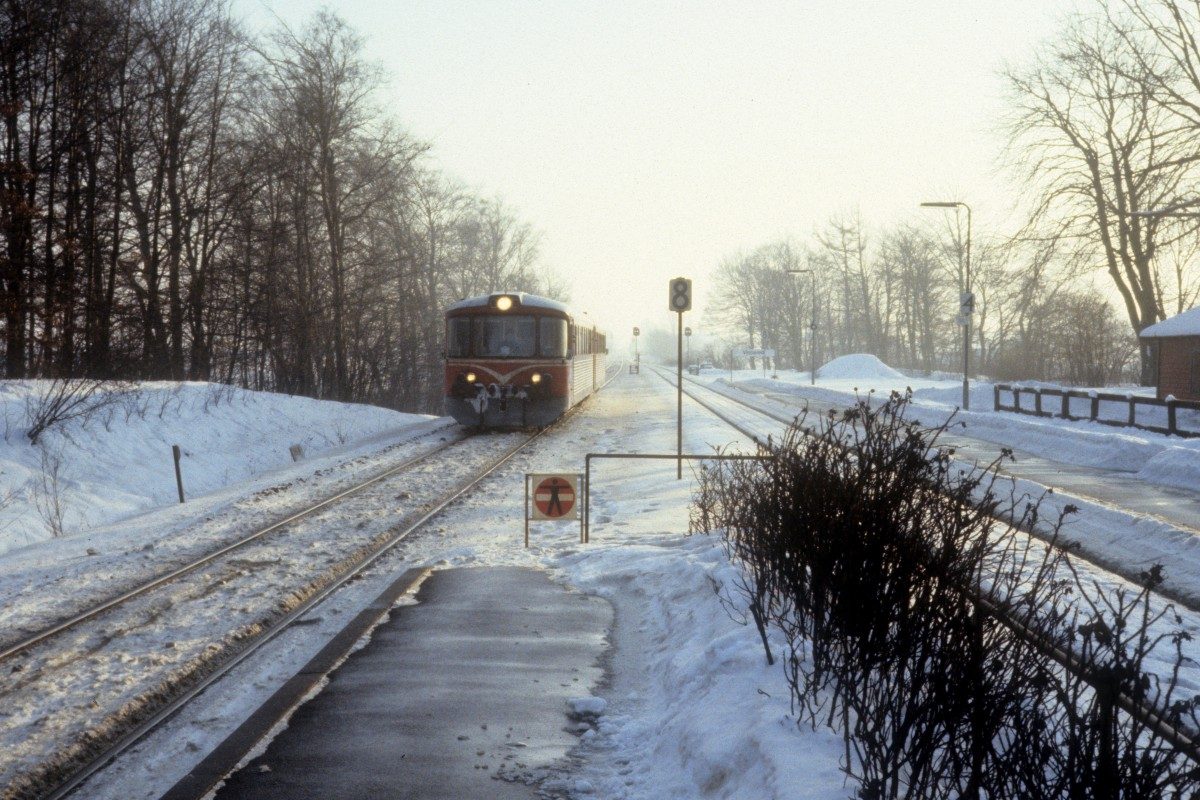
Vipperød station in 1981

== See also ==
- List of railway stations in Denmark
- Rail transport in Denmark
- History of rail transport in Denmark
