= Kalundborg East railway station =

Railway halt in Zealand, Denmark

Kalundborg Øst–Biotekbyen

General information
- Location: Stejlhøj 8A; 4400 Kalundborg; Kalundborg Municipality; Denmark
- Coordinates: 55°40′35″N 11°07′15″E
- Elevation: 8.1 metres (27 ft)
- Owner: Banedanmark
- Line: Northwest Line
- Platforms: 1
- Tracks: 1
- Train operators: DSB

Other information
- Website: Official website

History
- Opened: December 8, 2018; 7 years ago

Services
Preceding station	DSB	Following station
Svebølle towards Østerport	Copenhagen–Kalundborg Regional train	Kalundborg Terminus
Location

Kalundborg East – Biotekbyen railway halt is a railway halt serving the large industrial and urban development area in the eastern part of the city of Kalundborg in West Zealand, Denmark. The halt is situated about 1.5 km from the city centre, close to the Kalundborg town hall, the pharmaceutical company Novo Nordisk and the area's educational institutions.

Opened in 2018, Kalundborg East railway halt is located on the Northwest Line from Roskilde to Kalundborg. It offers direct regional rail services to Kalundborg, Holbæk, Roskilde and Copenhagen, operated by the national railway company DSB.

== History ==
Kalundborg East railway halt was constructed in 2018 on the Northwest Line, which opened in 1874. It was built to improve commuter access to train services when travelling to the area's many workplaces and educational institutions. Construction began in September and the railway halt opened on December 8, 2018; 7 years ago. It was built by the railway infrastructure company Banedanmark and financed by Banedanmark, Kalundborg Municipality and the pharmaceutical company Novo Nordisk.

== Services ==
The station offers direct regional rail services to Kalundborg, Holbæk, Roskilde and Copenhagen, operated by the national railway company DSB.

== See also ==
- List of railway stations in Denmark
- Rail transport in Denmark
