= Manniche =

Manniche is a surname. Notable people with the surname include:

- Arner Ludvig Valdemar Manniche (1867–1957), Danish zoologist
- Claus Manniche (born 1956), Danish rheumatologist
- Michael Manniche (born 1959), Danish footballer
