= Svebølle =

- Town
- Location in Denmark Svebølle (Denmark Region Zealand)
- Coordinates: 55°39′8″N 11°17′30″E
- Country: Denmark
- Region: Region Zealand
- Municipality: Kalundborg Municipality

Area
  - Urban: 1.8 km^{2} (0.69 sq mi)

Population (2026)
  - Urban: 2,243
  - Urban density: 1,200/km^{2} (3,200/sq mi)
- Time zone: UTC+1 (CET)
  - Summer (DST): UTC+2 (CEST)
- Postal code: DK-4470 Svebølle

Svebølle is a railway town, with a population of 2,243 (1 January 2026), in Kalundborg Municipality, Region Zealand in Denmark. It is located 10 km east of Kalundborg, at the North West Line between Holbæk and Kalundborg, and is served by Svebølle railway station.

Svebølle was the municipal seat of the former Bjergsted Municipality until 1 January 2007.

Svebølle BI 2016 is the local football (soccer) club in the town.
