= Northwest Line (Denmark) =

Railway line in northwest Zealand, Denmark

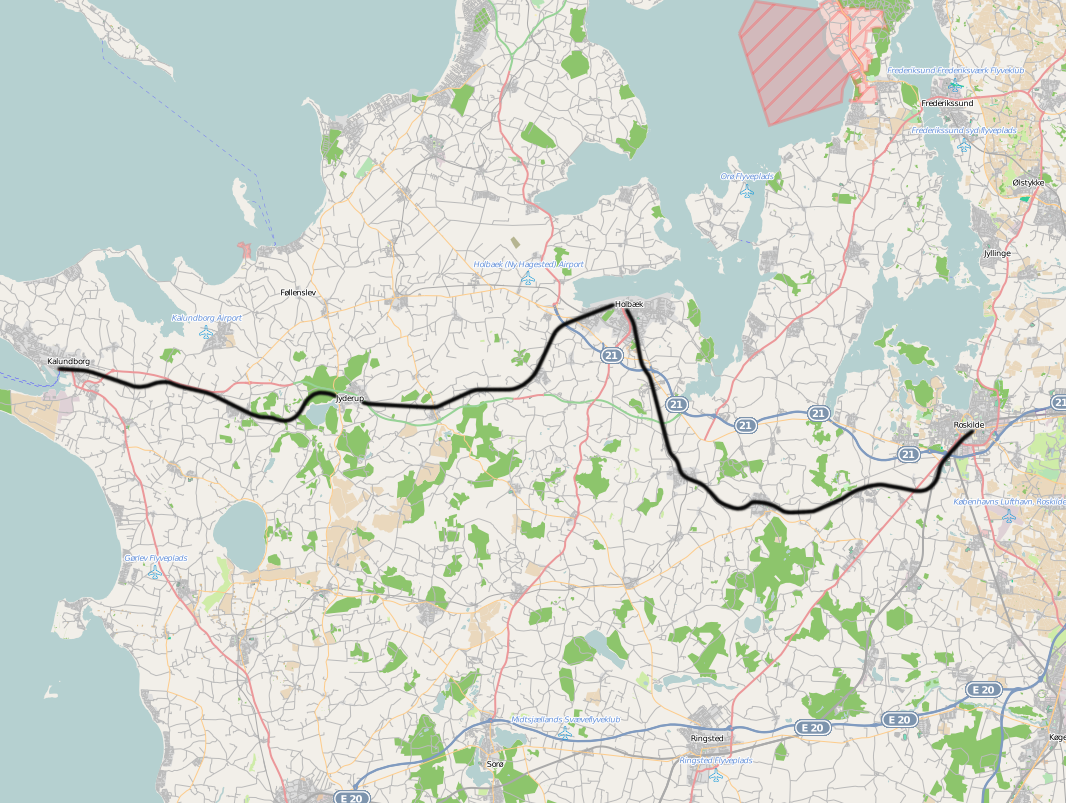

Overview
- Native name: Nordvestbanen
- Status: 13
- Owner: Banedanmark
- Termini: Roskilde 55.6386°N 12.0883°E; Kalundborg 55.6778°N 11.0890°E
- Stations: 13

Service
- Type: Railway
- System: Danish railways
- Operator: DSB

Technical
- Line length: 79.3 km
- Character: Regional railway

The Northwest Line (Danish: Nordvestbanen), also referred to as the Kalundborg Line (Danish: Kalundborgbanen), is a 79.3 km (49.3 mi) long, state-owned single track passenger railway line between Roskilde and Kalundborg in the western part of the island of Zealand. The railway is owned by Banedanmark and the service is operated by DSB between Copenhagen Central Station and Kalundborg.

The busiest station on the line is Holbaek, and the section from Roskilde to Holbaek was doubletracked in 2014 and electrified in 2021. The remainder is due for electrification and upgrading to ERMTS level 2 in the future.

== History ==
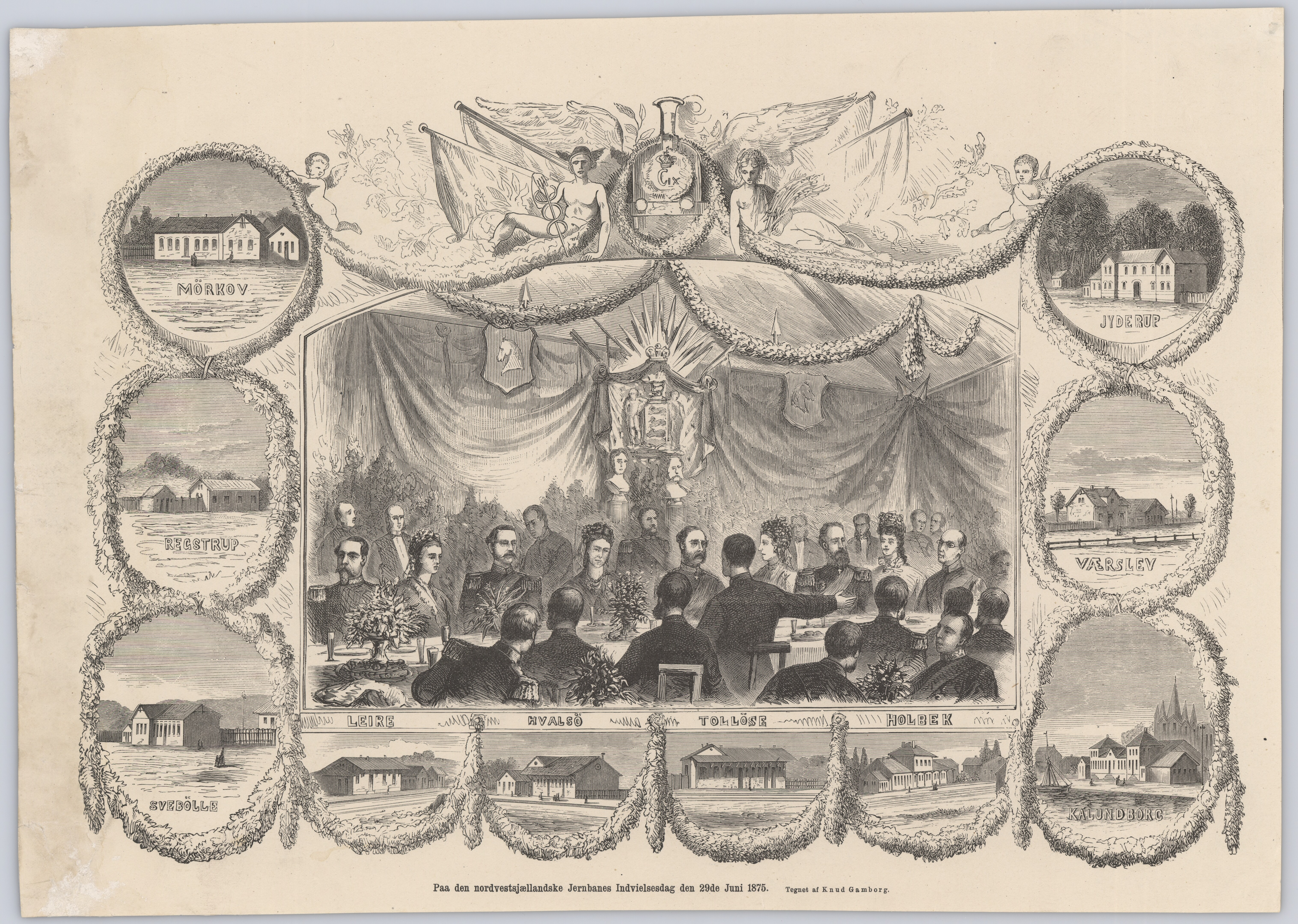
Print commemorating the inauguration of the Northwest Railway

The railway was established as a result of the Railway Act of 29. February 1869. The rail line opened on 30 December 1874.

== Stations ==
| Station | Location | Distance from Roskilde (km) | Distance from Kalundborg (km) | Comments |
|---|---|---|---|---|
| Roskilde station | Roskilde | 0.0 | 79.3 | |
| Lejre station (Lj) | Lejre | 9.0 | 70.3 | |
| Kisserup halt (former) | Kisserup | 15.0 | 64.2 | |
| Hvalsø station (Hv) | Kirke Hvalsø | 17.0 | 62.3 | |
| Tølløse station (Tø) | Tølløse | 23.0 | 56.3 | Transfer to the Høng-Tølløse Railway |
| Skimmede halt (former) | Skimmede | 26.0 | 53.3 | |
| Vipperød station (Pe) | Vipperød | 30.0 | 49.3 | |
| Holbæk station (Hk) | Holbæk | 36.0 | 43.3 | Transfer to the Odsherred Line |
| Regstrup station (Rt) | Regstrup | 44.0 | 35.3 | |
| Knabstrup halt (Ks) | Knabstrup | 48.0 | 31.3 | |
| Mørkøv station (Mø) | Mørkøv | 51.0 | 28.3 | |
| Tornved halt (former) | Tornved | 55.0 | 24.3 | |
| Jyderup station (Jy) | Jyderup | 58.0 | 21.4 | |
| Svebølle station (Se) | Svebølle | 66.0 | 13.3 | |
| Viskinge station | Viskinge | 68.0 | 11.3 | |
| Værslev station (Væ) (former stop) | Værslev | 71.0 | 8.3 | Technical station with passing track. Passenger service terminated in 1965. Formerly transfer to Hørve-Værslev Railway (1919-1956), Værslev-Slagelse line (1898-1971). |
| Ubberup halt (former) | Ubberup | 74.0 | 5.3 | |
| Kalundborg Øst halt (Kb) | Kalundborg | 77.1 | 2.2 | Opened 8 December 2018. |
| Kalundborg station (Kb) | Kalundborg | 79.3 | 0.0 | |
