= Roskilde railway station =

Railway station in Roskilde, Denmark

Roskilde Station Roskilde Banegård
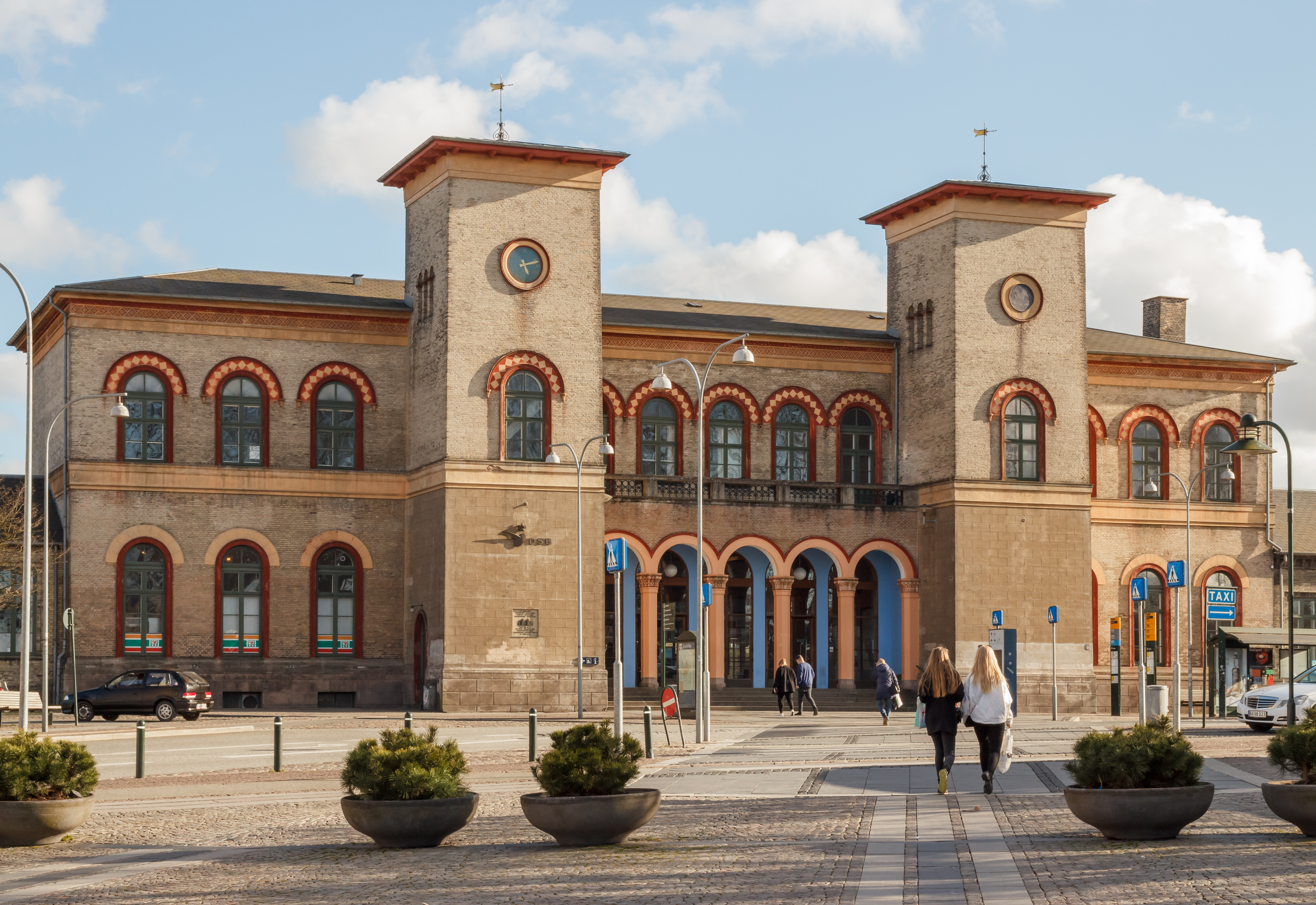
- Roskilde station in 2015

General information
- Location: Jernbanegade 1; 4000 Roskilde; Roskilde Municipality; Denmark
- Coordinates: 55°38′19″N 12°05′18″E
- Elevation: 44.6 metres (146 ft)
- System: railway junction
- Owner: DSB (station infrastructure); Banedanmark (rail infrastructure)
- Lines: West Line; Northwest Line; South Line; Little South Line
- Train operators: DSB; Lokaltog
- Connections: Bus: Movia

Other information
- Station code: Ro
- Website: Official website

History
- Opened: 26 June 1847

Services
Preceding station	DSB	Following station
Valby towards Copenhagen Central	Copenhagen-Aalborg InterCity	Ringsted towards Aalborg Airport
Trekroner towards Copenhagen Airport	Copenhagen–Slagelse Regional train	Ringsted towards Slagelse
Trekroner towards Helsingør	Elsinore–Copenhagen– Roskilde–Næstved Regional train	Viby Sjælland towards Næstved
Høje Taastrup towards Østerport	Copenhagen–Kalundborg Regional train	Holbæk towards Kalundborg
Trekroner towards Helsingør	Elsinore–Copenhagen– Roskilde–Holbæk Regional train	Lejre towards Holbæk
Preceding station	Lokaltog	Following station
Terminus	East Line Faxe branch Local train	Gadstrup towards Faxe Ladeplads
Terminus	East Line Rødvig branch Local train	Gadstrup towards Rødvig
Location
- Location within Denmark Location within Denmark Region Zealand

Roskilde Station (Danish: Roskilde Station or Roskilde Banegård) is the principal railway station serving the city of Roskilde on the island of Zealand, Denmark. It is located in central Roskilde, on the southeastern edge of the historic town centre, and lies immediately adjacent to the Roskilde bus station.

Roskilde station is situated on the Danish Main Line between Copenhagen and Jutland. The station is also a terminus for the Little South Line which connects Roskilde to Næstved in southern Zealand by way of Køge, and the Northwest Line which connects Roskilde to Kalundborg in northwestern Zealand.

Completed in 1847, it is the oldest railway station in Denmark still in use. It was listed in the Danish registry of protected buildings and places in 1964.

== History ==
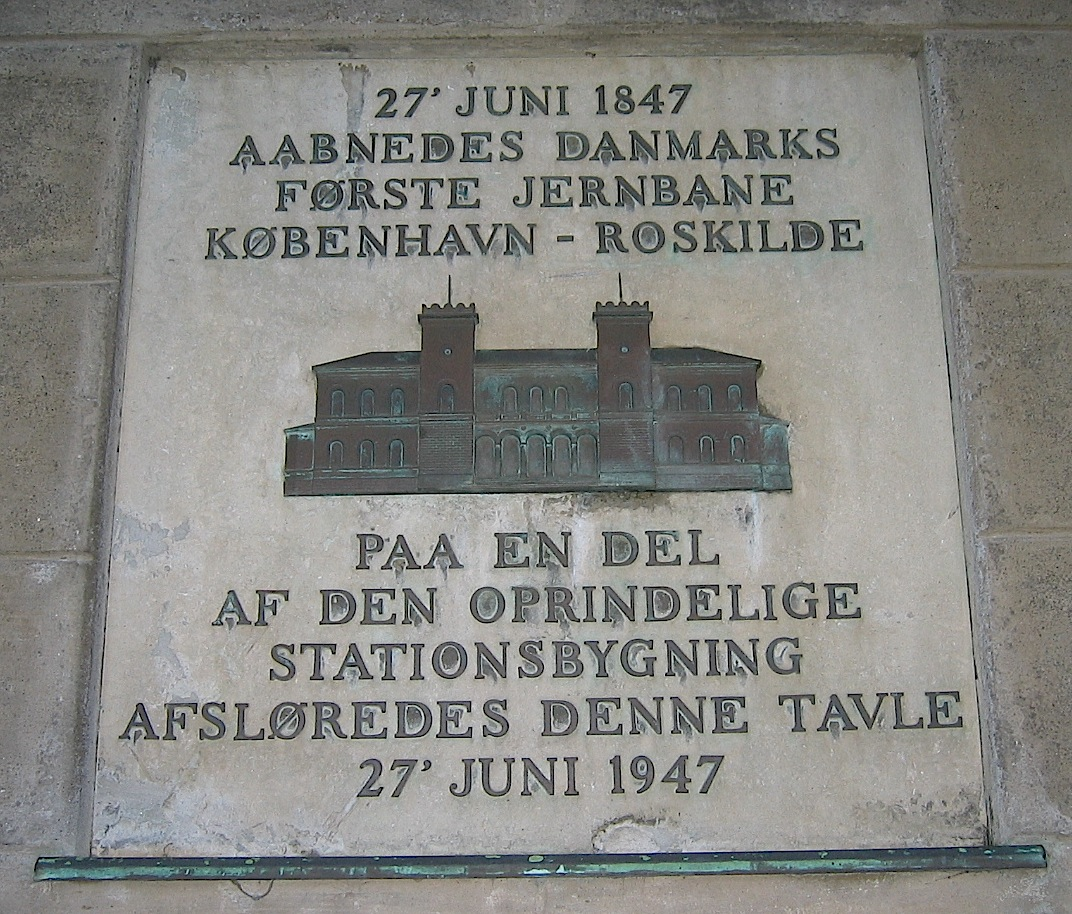
Commemorative plaque at Roskilde station marking the centenary of the Copenhagen–Roskilde railway line opened on 27 June 1847.

The railway station in Roskilde opened in 1847 to serve as the western terminal station of the new Copenhagen–Roskilde railway line from Copenhagen to Roskilde. This was the first railway line in the Kingdom of Denmark (Note: The first railway line in the then Danish Monarchy was the Kiel-Altona railway line in the Duchy of Holstein which had been completed three years earlier. However, the Duchy of Holstein was later lost to the Kingdom of Prussia after the Second Schleswig War in 1864, and that railway line is today part of the German rail network.), and was constructed on behalf of the privately owned Zealand Railway Company (Danish: Det Sjællandske Jernbaneselskab) by the British engineering company William Radford. The station was ceremonially opened on 26 June 1847 along with the railway line, and the following day the railway opened to regular traffic with three trains daily in each direction.

The Copenhagen–Roskilde railway line was prolonged from Roskilde to the port city of Korsør by the Great Belt in 1856. In 1870, Roskilde station also became the northern terminus of the original Zealand South Line which was completed for the Zealand Railway Company and connected Roskilde with Masnedsund on the south coast of Zealand via Køge and Næstved. In 1874, the Zealand Railway Company also opened the Northwest Line which connected Roskilde station with Holbæk and Kalundborg in northwestern Zealand. In 1880, the Zealand Railway Company was taken over by the Danish state, and in 1885 became part of the national railway company DSB.

== Architecture ==
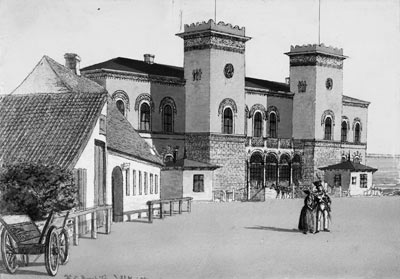
Roskilde station in 1849 with the loggia still intact

The station building was inaugurated in connection with the opening of the Copenhagen–Roskilde railway line on 26 June 1847. As Copenhagen Central Station has been moved twice since then, the current station building being from 1911, Roskilde's station building is the oldest station building in the country though both the building and platforms have been expanded several times over the years. It was long thought that the construction company William Radford also designed the station in Roskilde but it has later been established that the architect was J.F. Meyer, a Dane.

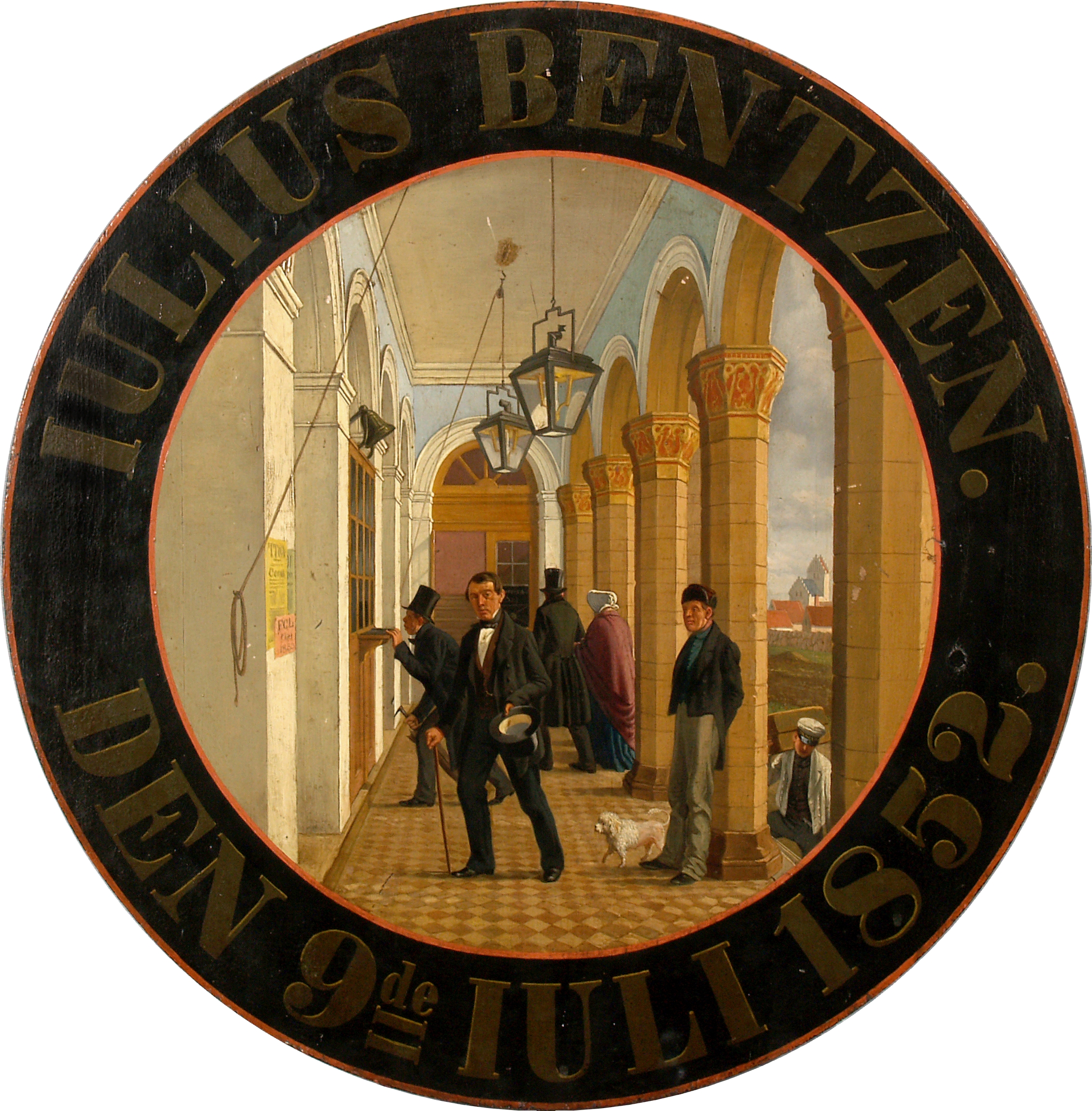
A target from Roskilde Shooting Society, depicting a scene from the loggia

The design of the station is believed to have been inspired by the Villa Borghese Pinciana in Rome. Facing the city centre, the front of the original station building is symmetrical with two short rectangular towers with flat roofs flanking the main entrance. A loggia in front of the main entrance, now removed, was topped by a balcony in front of a restaurant.

The station saw a major refurbishment from 1998 to 2002. The facade was brought back to its original colouring, the roof and tunnels were renovated, elevators and automatic doors were installed, and the arrival hall received new paving and furnishings.

The station building was listed in 1964. The adjacent carriage house complex from 1898/1920 was listed in 1991.

== Services ==
Roskilde station serves inter city, regional and international trains.

== Cultural references ==
=== In music ===
For the opening of the Copenhagen–Roskilde railway line in 1847, the Danish composer Hans Christian Lumbye composed the still popular Copenhagen Steam Railway Galop, a musical composition which faithfully recreates the sounds of a train chugging out of a station and grinding to a halt at the next stop and which traditionally ends with the cry "Next stop Roskilde - the train does not go any further". The Copenhagen Steam Railway Galop was included in the 2006 Danish Culture Canon as a masterpiece of Danish classical music.

== Facilities ==
Inside the station building there is a combined ticket office and convenience store operated by 7-Eleven, ticket machines, waiting room and toilets.

Adjacent to the station is the Roskilde bus station.

== See also ==
- Ro's Torv
- Transportation in Denmark
- Rail transport in Denmark
- History of rail transport in Denmark
- List of railway stations in Denmark
- Danish State Railways
- Banedanmark
