= Pronova BioPharma =

Norwegian company

Pronova BioPharma is a Norwegian company. In Denmark it is a bulk manufacturer of omega-3 products with a manufacturing plant in Kalundborg. It was acquired by BASF in 2014.

Pronova BioPharma ASA had its roots in Norway's codfish liver oil industry. The company was founded in 1991 as a spinout from the JC Martens company, which in turn was founded in 1838 in Bergen, Norway. Pronova developed the concentrated omega-3-acid ethyl esters formulation that is the active pharmaceutical ingredient of Lovaza.

== Lovaza ==
Pronova won approvals to market the drug, called Omacor in Europe (and initially in the US), in several European countries in 2001 after conducting a three-and-a-half-year trial in 11,000 subjects; The company partnered with other companies like Pierre Fabre in France. In 2004, Pronova licensed the US and Puerto Rican rights to Reliant Therapeutics, whose business model was in-licensing of cardiovascular drugs. In that same year, Reliant and Pronova won FDA approval for the drug, and it was launched in the US and Europe in 2005. Global sales in 2005 were $144M, and by 2008, they were $778M. By 17 November 2010, the constituent companies of the OSEAX included Pronova BioPharma.

In 2009, generic companies Teva Pharmaceuticals and Par Pharmaceutical made clear their intentions to file Abbreviated New Drug Applications (“ANDAs”) to bring generics to market, and in April 2009, Pronova sued them from infringing the key US patents covering Lovaza, US 5,656,667 (due to expire in April 2017), US 5,502,077 (exp March 2013). Subsequently, in May 2012, a district court ruled in Pronova's favor, saying that the patents were valid. The generic companies appealed, and in September 2013, the Federal Circuit reversed, saying that because more than one year before Pronova's predecessor company applied for a patent, it had sent samples of the fish oil used in Lovaza to a researcher for testing. This event thus constituted "public use" that invalidated the patent in question. Generic versions of Lovaza were introduced in America in April 2014.

Pronovo has continued to manufacture the ingredients in Lovaza, and in 2012, BASF announced it would acquire Pronova for $844 million. The deal closed in 2013.

== Research ==
Pronova BioPharma is a commercial partner in MabCent-SFI.

== Brand names ==
- Lovaz (US)/Omacor (Europe), sold by Woodward Pharma Services, LLC in the US; created and manufactured by Pronova. It was approved in the United States in 2004.
