= Vipperød =

- town
- Location in Region Zealand Vipperød (Denmark)
- Coordinates: 55.667778°N 11.741944°E
- Country: Denmark
- Region: Zealand (Sjælland)
- Municipality: Holbæk
- Parish: Vipperød Parish

Area
  - Urban: 1.6 km^{2} (0.62 sq mi)

Population (2026)
  - Urban: 2,803
  - Urban density: 1,800/km^{2} (4,500/sq mi)
- Time zone: UTC+1 (CET)
  - Summer (DST): UTC+2 (CEST)
- Postal code: DK-4390 Vipperød

Vipperød is a railway town located 4 km south of Holbæk on the northwestern part of the island of Zealand in Holbæk Municipality, Region Zealand in Denmark. It has a population of 2,803 (1 January 2026).

Vipperød is located at the Danish national road 21 and is served by Vipperød railway station located on the railway line between Roskilde and Holbæk.
