= Frida Schou =

Danish businesswoman

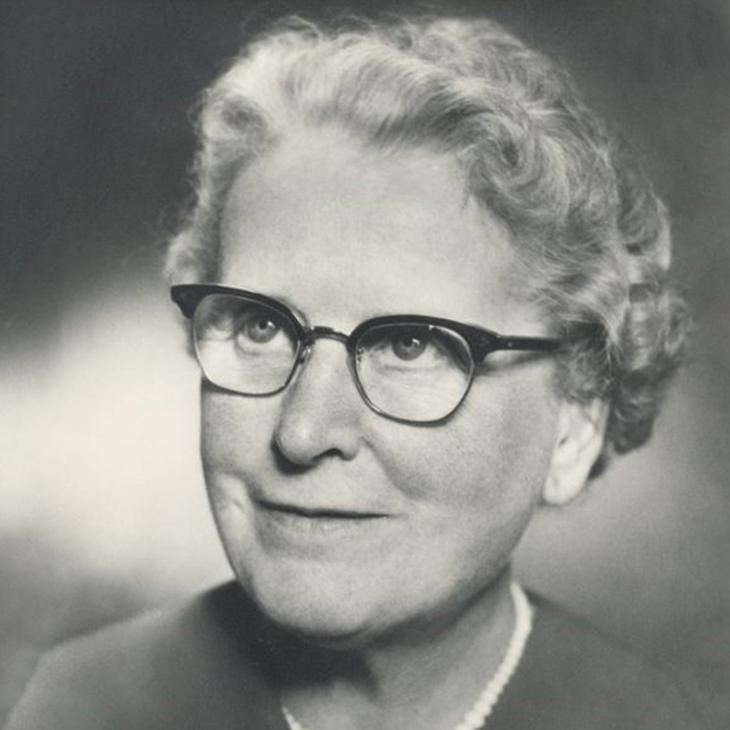
Frida Schou

Frida Maria Schou (1891–1980) was an early Danish businesswoman. Despite lifelong dyslexia, from 1928 to 1967 she ran Knabstrup Teglværk, a brick and porcelain factory near Holbæk in western Zealand. At the time, it was quite unusual for a woman to head such a large industrial establishment. She is remembered for her energetic and efficient leadership and for her concern for the well-being of a workforce of up to 160 employees. In addition, she was a board member of another brick factory, Skandinavisk Molerindustri on the island of Mors (1946–1970), serving seven years as chair.

== Early life ==
Born on 16 June 1891 on the Mullerupgård estate near Slagelse in western Zealand, Frida Maria Schou was one of the six children of the businessman Hans Henrik Schou (1860–1928) and his wife Anna Marie Mercedita née Krogh (1862–1944). Unlike her twin sister Hedevig, as a result of dyslexia she had difficulty at school and was unable to take the matriculation examination at Marie Kruse's School in Copenhagen. Instead she became the favourite daughter of her father whom she accompanied in his business activities, learning his management skills.

== Career ==
Frida had hoped to become a nurse but when her only brother decided to study medicine, her father persuaded her in 1913 to take over the management of the brick factory Mullerup Teglværk and the surrounding country estates. When brick production suffered from the First World War, around 1920 she perfected her knowledge of agriculture and ran the farms, employing female labour.

In 1926, her father who was suffering from poor health persuaded her to help him run the Knabstrup factory. When he died in 1928, she joined the board and in 1932 became the company's director. Thanks to her enterprising ideas, the business prospered, producing not only bricks but pottery. She soon started manufacturing washbasins, vases and tableware. By the mid-1960s, she had a workforce of up to 160 including a number of ceramic artists.

Frida Schou died in Gørlev on 19 September 1980 and was buried in Slagelse.

== Awards ==
- In 1951, Schou was awarded the Royal Medal of Recompense.
