= Claus Manniche =

Danish rheumatologist (born 1956)

Claus Manniche (born 21 June 1956) is a Danish physician, rheumatologist, and researcher specialising in musculoskeletal medicine, back pain, and vertebral endplate pathology. He holds the degrees of MD, Dr.Med. (doctorate in medicine), and Cand.Jur. (law). He is a Visiting Researcher and Guest Professor at the Department of Occupational and Environmental Medicine, Odense University Hospital / University of Southern Denmark (OUH/SDU). He has an h-index of 58 and has authored more than 200 peer-reviewed journal articles.

Claus Manniche was born in Kalundborg, Denmark. He studied medicine at the University of Copenhagen, graduating in 1982 and obtaining his medical licence in 1985. He subsequently earned a law degree (Cand.Jur.) in 1988. He specialised in rheumatology, obtaining specialist qualification in 1994.

In 1998, Manniche was appointed Professor and Director of the Spine Center of Southern Denmark, a position he held for more than a decade. He has been involved in influential professional bodies including the Danish Rheumatology Society and the Copenhagen Back Research Association, and was appointed by the Danish Minister of Health to a specialist committee on the prevention of back problems.

Since retiring from his directorship, Manniche has continued active research as Visiting Researcher and Guest Professor at OUH/SDU, focusing on Modic changes, translational spine research, and evidence-based methodology in musculoskeletal medicine.
