= Østerport railway station =

Railway station in Copenhagen, Denmark

Østerport
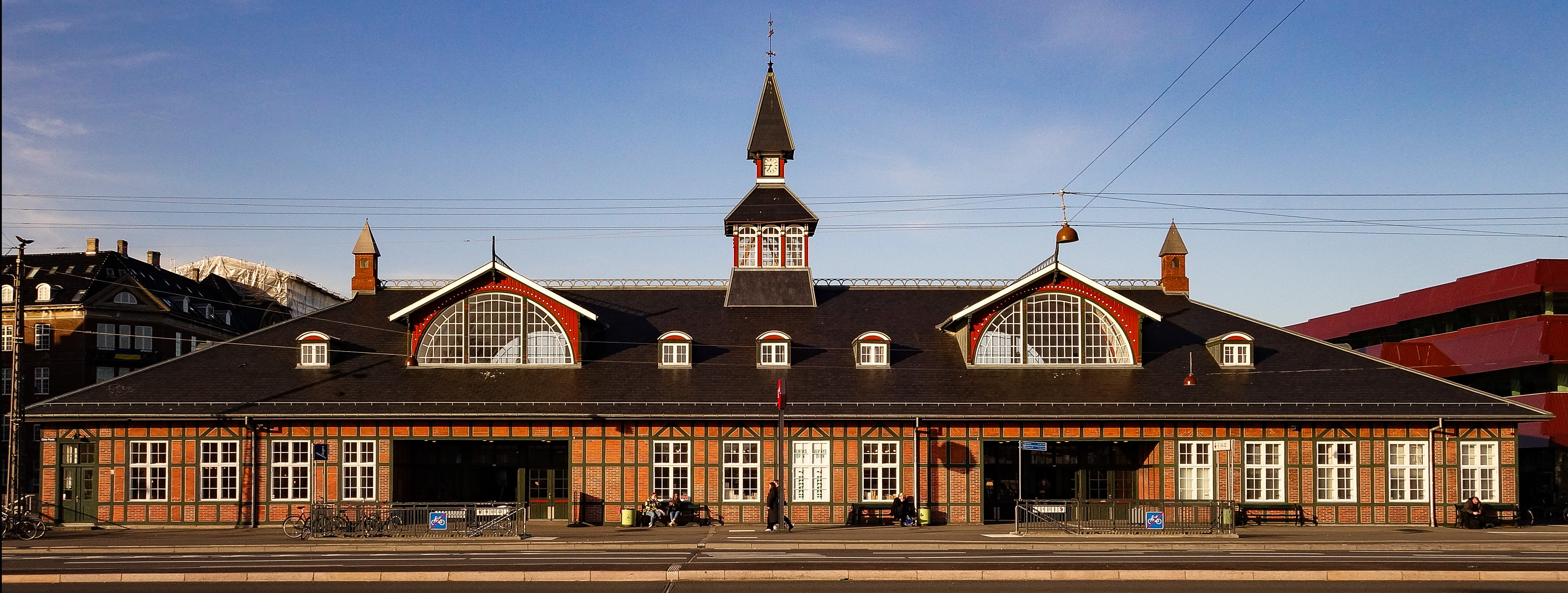
- Østerport station in 2005

General information
- Location: Oslo Plads 8; 2100 Copenhagen Ø Copenhagen Municipality; Denmark
- Coordinates: 55°41′32″N 12°35′15″E
- Elevation: 6.8 metres (22 ft)
- Owner: DSB (station infrastructure); Banedanmark (rail infrastructure)
- Platforms: 6 island platforms (1 Metro, 2 S-train, 3 Kystbanen)
- Tracks: 9 in service (incl Metro) + 1 siding
- Train operators: DSB; Skånetrafiken; Metro Service A/S
- Bus routes: 23, 27

Construction
- Structure type: Above ground (Regional, S-train); Underground (Metro)
- Platform levels: 2

Other information
- Station code: Kk
- Fare zone: 1

History
- Opened: 2 August 1897; 129 years ago
- Rebuilt: 15 May 1934 (S-train)
- Electrified: 1934 (S-train), 1986 (Mainline)
Location

Østerport station is a metro, S-train and main line railway station in Copenhagen, Denmark. It is located between the districts of Indre By and Østerbro, and is named for the historic Østerport city gate, near the original location of which it is located.

The station is served by some InterCity services across Denmark, regular and frequent regional train services to and from Zealand and southern Sweden, as well as commuter rail services on the S-train network. As of 29 September 2019, Østerport is also served by the Copenhagen Metro City Circle Line and M4.

The station is used by approximately 30,000 passengers each day.

== History ==
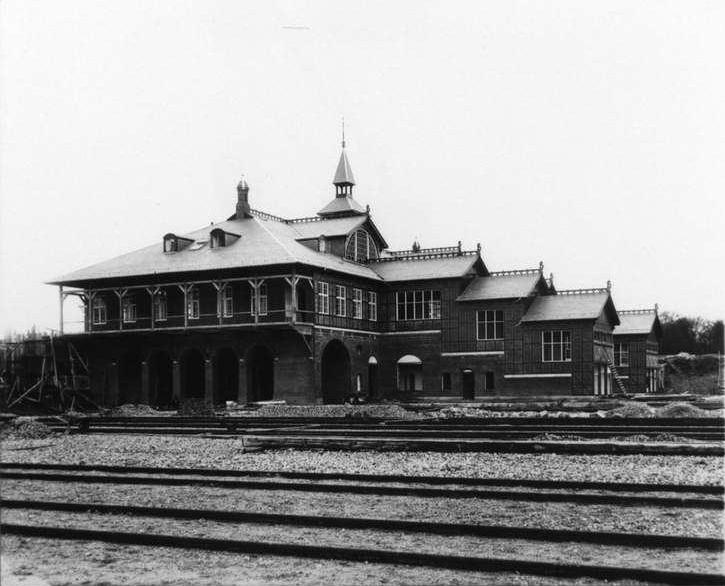
The station under construction in 1896–1897. Photo by Peter Elfelt.

The station opened in 1897 as the southern terminus of the Coast Line from Copenhagen to Helsingør. It was originally named the East Station (Østbanegaarden).

It was originally the terminus for the Coast Line, but when the station was connected with Nørreport Station and Copenhagen Central Station via the Boulevard Line in 1917, the terminus moved to the Central Station. In 1934, the station started serving S-trains.

== Architecture ==
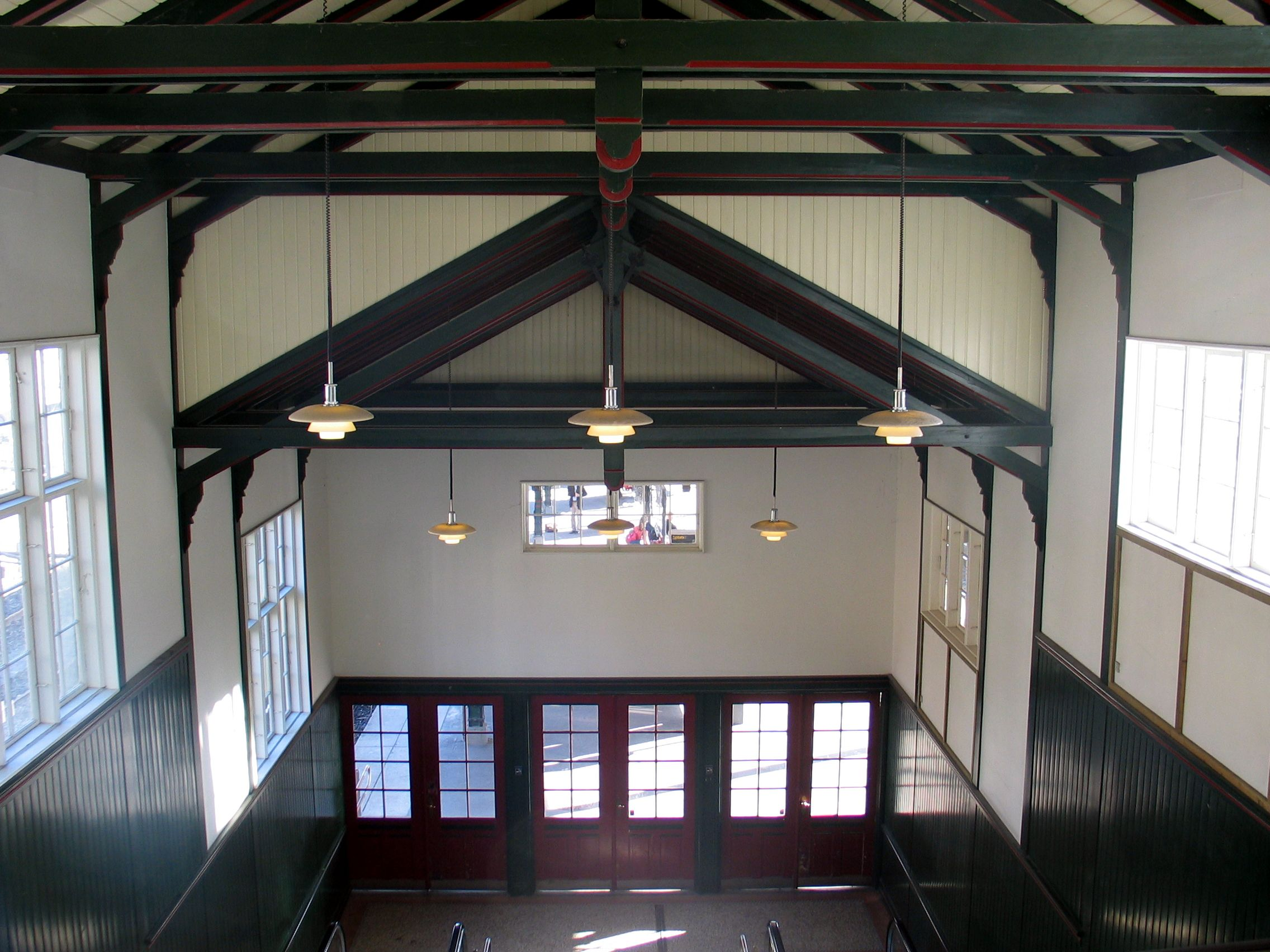
Platforms stairs

The station was designed by Danish architect Heinrich Wenck, who was head architect of the Danish State Railways from 1894 to 1921. The station is designed in National Romantic style, a Nordic architectural style that was part of the National Romantic movement during the late 19th and early 20th centuries, and which is often considered to be a form of Art Nouveau.

Although originally intended as a temporary solution, the original station building has survived to the present day. It was restored in the 1980s and again in the 2010s.

== Services ==
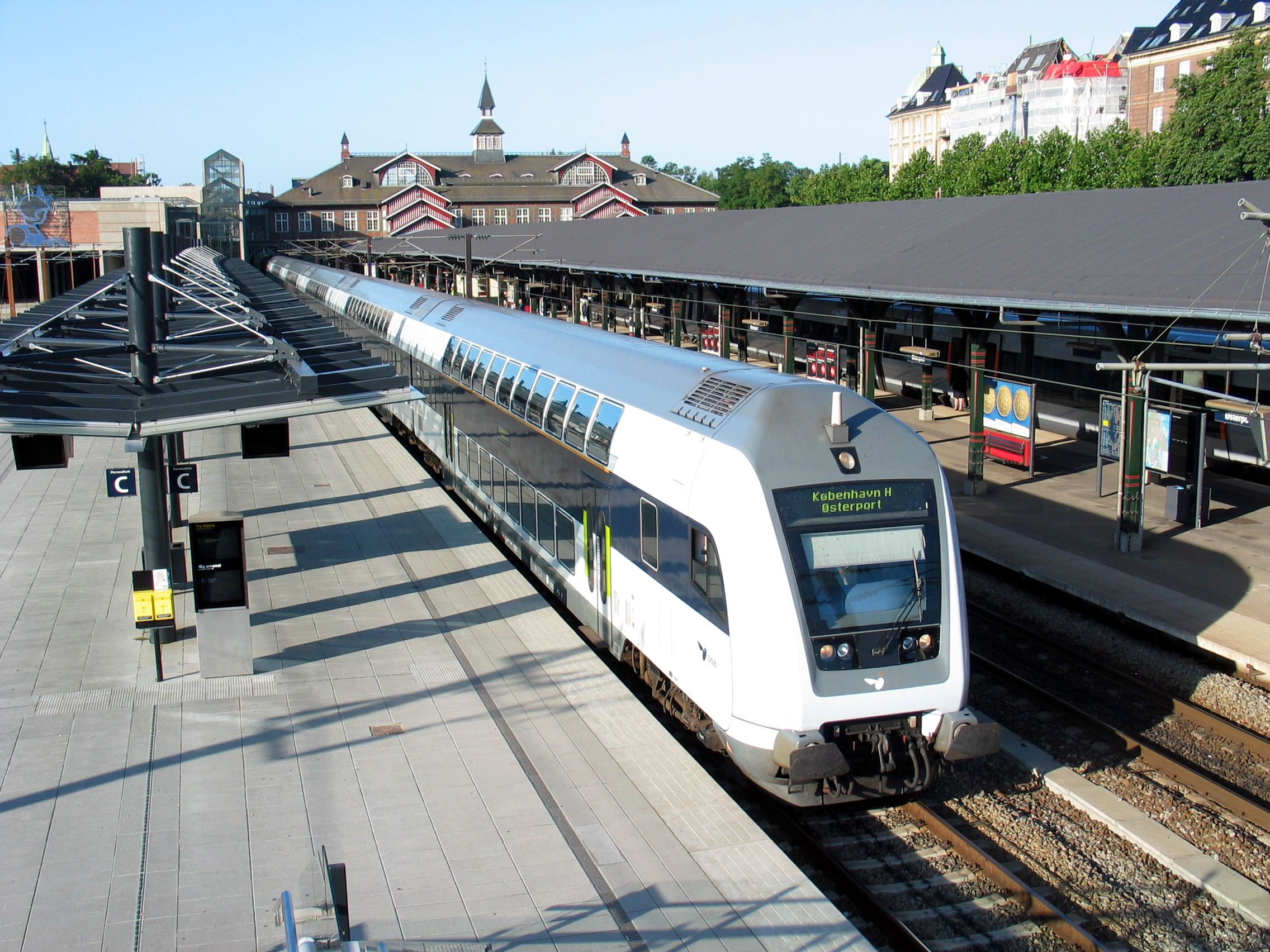
A DSB regional train at Østerport station

The station is served by some InterCity services across Denmark, regular and frequent regional train services to and from Zealand and southern Sweden, as well as commuter rail services on the S-train network. By 2019, the service was included the Copenhagen Metro as well (future line M4).

== Metro station ==
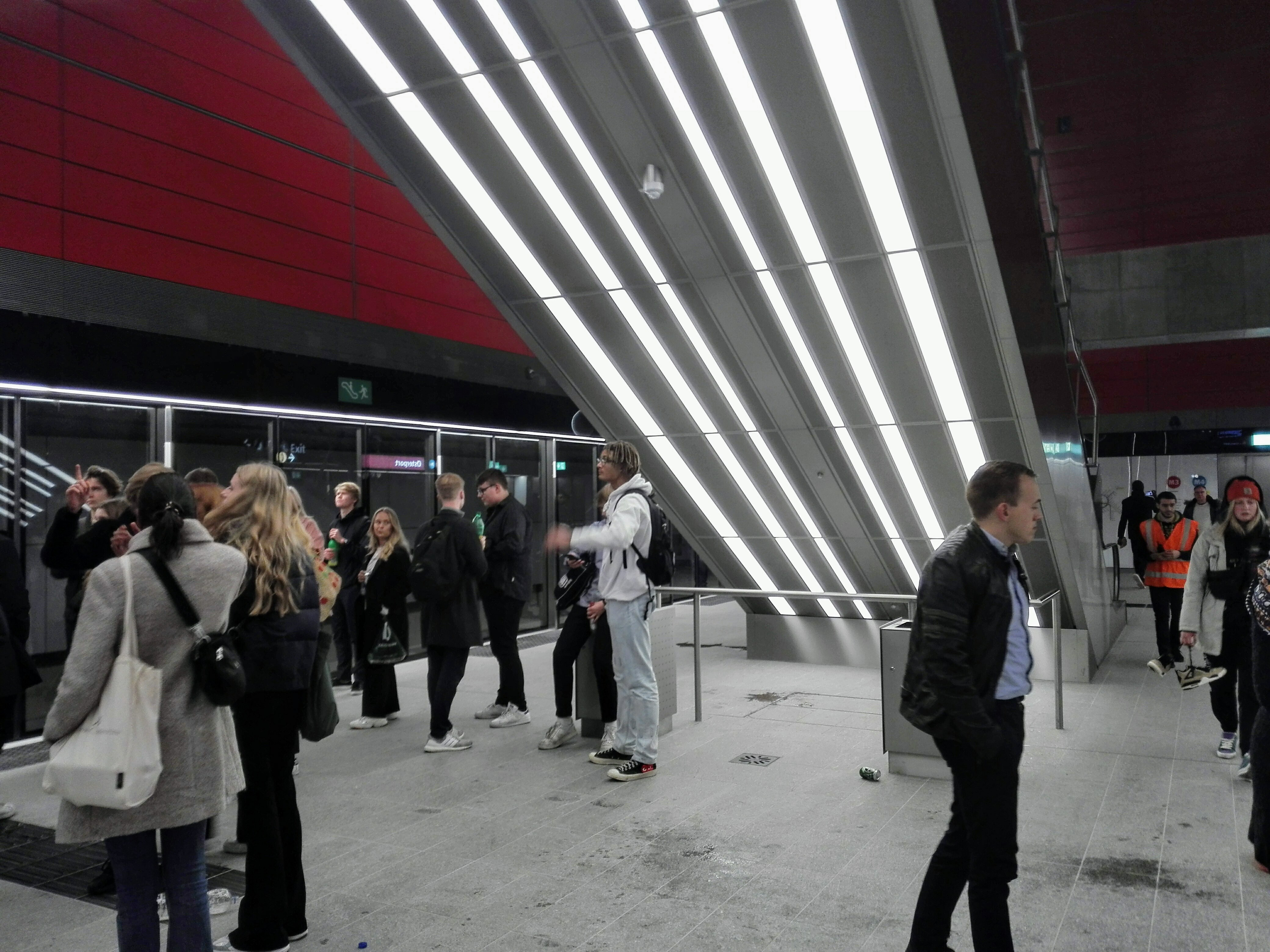
Platform level of the Metro station

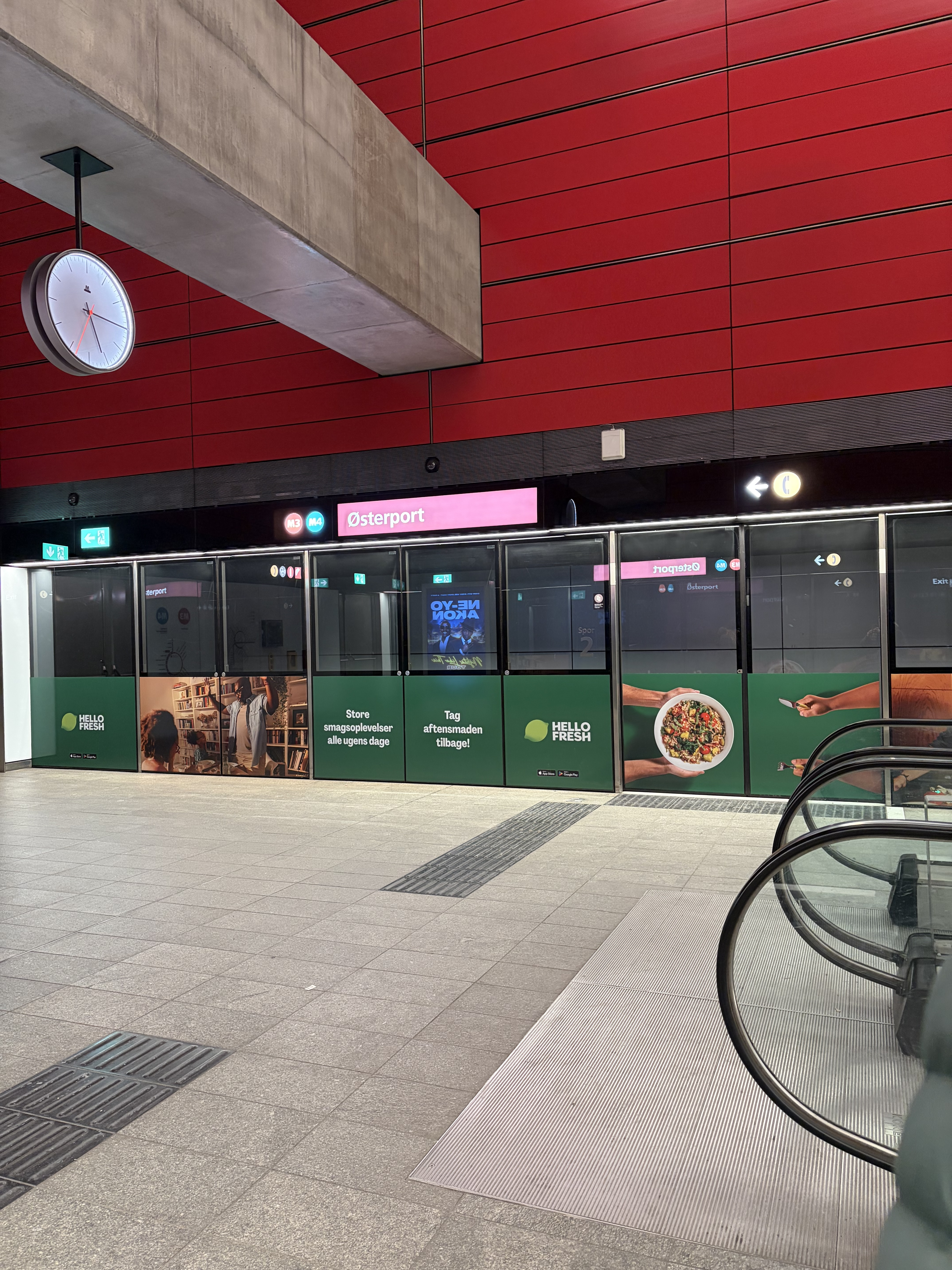
Platform level of the Metro station

The Copenhagen Metro line M3 (opened 2019) on the City Circle Line serves another station called Østerport. The metro station is located under the street Østbanegade with the staircase towards Østerport station. Another line M4 later supplement line M3, going to Nordhavn and Ny Ellebjerg. A subway between the metro platforms to Østerport station is in operating.

== Services ==
Preceding station	DSB	Following station
Terminus	Copenhagen–Esbjerg InterCity	Nørreport towards Esbjerg
Hellerup towards Helsingør	Elsinore–Copenhagen– Roskilde–Holbæk Regional train	Nørreport towards Holbæk
Hellerup towards Helsingør	Elsinore–Copenhagen– Roskilde–Næstved Regional train	Nørreport towards Næstved
Hellerup towards Helsingør	Elsinore–Copenhagen– Køge–Næstved Regional train Peak hours	Nørreport towards Næstved
Terminus	Copenhagen–Køge–Næstved Regional train	Nørreport towards Næstved
Terminus	Copenhagen–Kalundborg Regional train	Nørreport towards Kalundborg
Preceding station	Øresundståg	Following station
Terminus	Copenhagen–Lund Øresundståg	Nørreport towards Lund C
Terminus	Copenhagen–Gothenburg Øresundståg	Nørreport towards Göteborg C
Terminus	Copenhagen–Kalmar Øresundståg	Nørreport towards Kalmar C
Terminus	Copenhagen–Karlskrona Øresundståg	Nørreport towards Karlskrona C
Preceding station	S-train	Following station
Nordhavn towards Hillerød	A	Nørreport towards Hundige
Nordhavn towards Hillerød	A Sat–Sun	Nørreport towards Køge
Nordhavn towards Farum	B	Nørreport towards Høje Taastrup
Nordhavn towards Buddinge	Bx Peak hours	Nørreport towards Høje Taastrup
Nordhavn towards Klampenborg	C	Nørreport towards Frederikssund
Nordhavn towards Holte	E Mon–Fri	Nørreport towards Køge
Terminus	H Mon–Fri	Nørreport towards Ballerup
Preceding station	Copenhagen Metro	Following station
Marmorkirken clockwise	M3	Trianglen counter-clockwise
Marmorkirken towards Copenhagen South	M4	Nordhavn towards Orientkaj

== Ridership ==
According to the Østtællingen in 2008:

Year	Total	Year	Total	Year	Total	Year	Total
1957	10,566	1974	9,627	1991	11,482	2001	10,484
1960	10,300	1975	9,556	1992	11,872	2002	10,484
1962	10,011	1977	9,012	1993	11,565	2003	10,991
1964	10,758	1979	12,220	1995	11,269	2004	10,346
1966	10,421	1981	13,263	1996	11,600	2005	9,504
1968	10,416	1984	13,386	1997	12,202	2006	9,779
1970	10,347	1987	12,407	1998	14,327	2007	10,598
1972	10,855	1990	11,563	2000	12,236	2008	9,518

== In popular culture ==
Østerport station is seen at 1:24:15 (track 13) and again at 1:24:48 /track 5/) in the 1975 Olsen Gang film The Olsen Gang on the Track.

== See also ==
- List of Copenhagen Metro stations
- List of Copenhagen S-train stations
- List of railway stations in Denmark
- Rail transport in Denmark
- History of rail transport in Denmark
- Transportation in Copenhagen
- Transportation in Denmark
- Banedanmark
- Danish State Railways
