= Holbæk railway station =

Railway station in Holbæk, Denmark

Holbæk
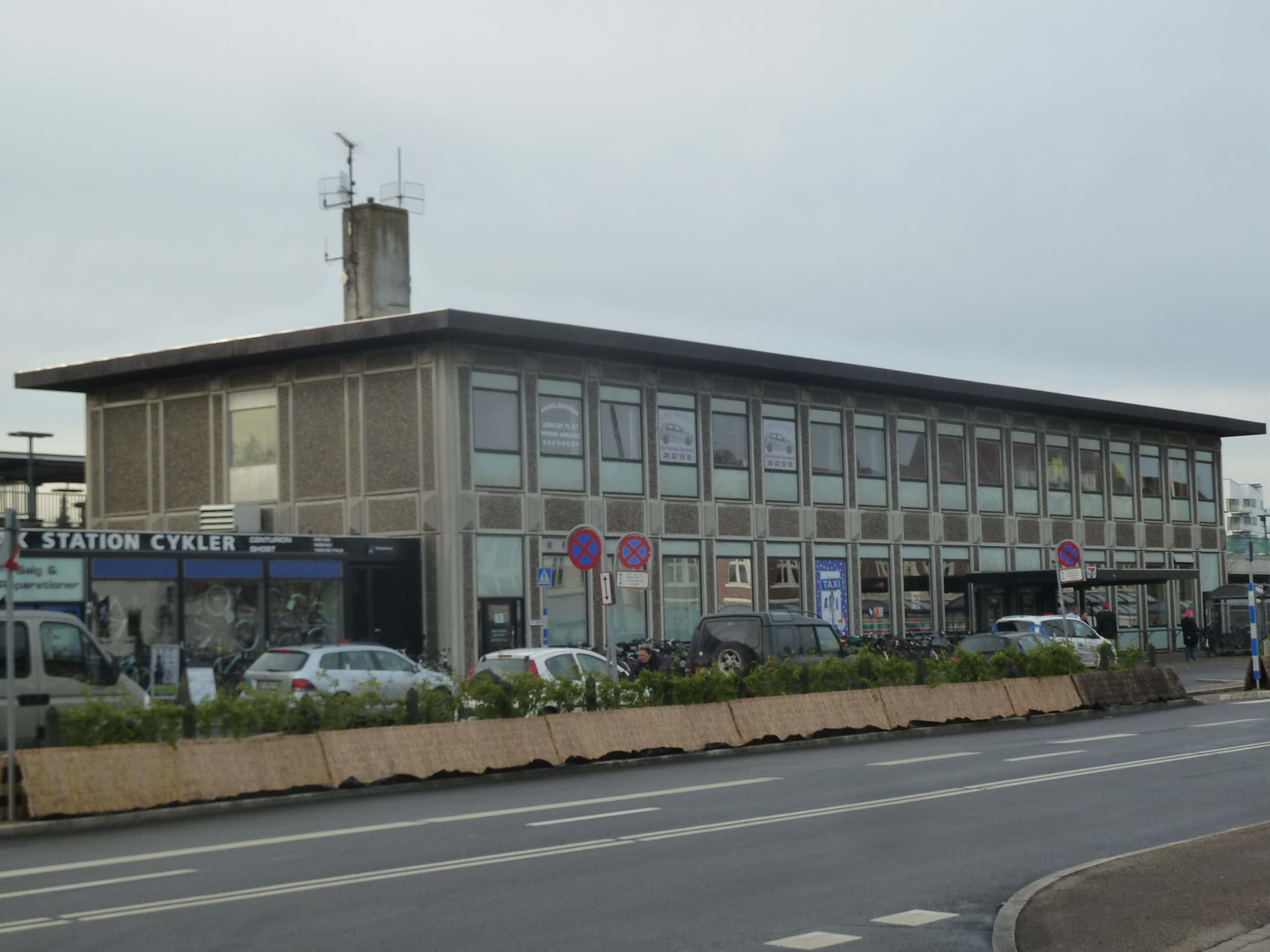
- Street facade of Holbæk station in 2012

General information
- Location: Jernbaneplads 7 DK-4300 Holbæk; Holbæk Municipality; Denmark
- Coordinates: 55°42′56.05″N 11°42′29.94″E
- Elevation: 15.6 metres (51 ft)
- Owner: DSB (station infrastructure); Banedanmark (rail infrastructure)
- Lines: Northwest Line; Odsherred Line
- Platforms: 2
- Tracks: 5
- Train operators: DSB; Lokaltog

Construction
- Architect: Adolf Ahrens (1875); Ole Ejnar Bonding (1972)

History
- Opened: 30 December 1874
- Rebuilt: 1972

Services
Preceding station	DSB	Following station
Hvalsø towards Østerport	Copenhagen–Kalundborg Regional train	Regstrup towards Kalundborg
Vipperød towards Helsingør	Elsinore–Copenhagen– Roskilde–Holbæk Regional train	Terminus
Preceding station	Lokaltog	Following station
Terminus	Odsherred Line Local train	Stenhus towards Nykøbing Sjælland
Location

Holbæk railway station (Danish: Holbæk Station or Holbæk Banegård) is the main railway station serving the town of Holbæk in northwestern Zealand, Denmark.

Holbæk station is located on the main line Northwest Line from Roskilde to Kalundborg and is the southern terminus of the Odsherredsbanen branch line from Holbæk to Nykøbing Sjælland. The station opened in 1874, and its second and current station building designed by the architect Ole Ejnar Bonding was inaugurated in 1972. It offers direct regional rail services to Copenhagen, Roskilde and Kalundborg operated by the national railway company DSB, as well as local train services to Nykøbing Sjælland, operated by the regional railway company Lokaltog.

== See also ==
- List of railway stations in Denmark
