= Kalundborg railway station =

Railway station in Kalundborg Municipality, Denmark

Kalundborg
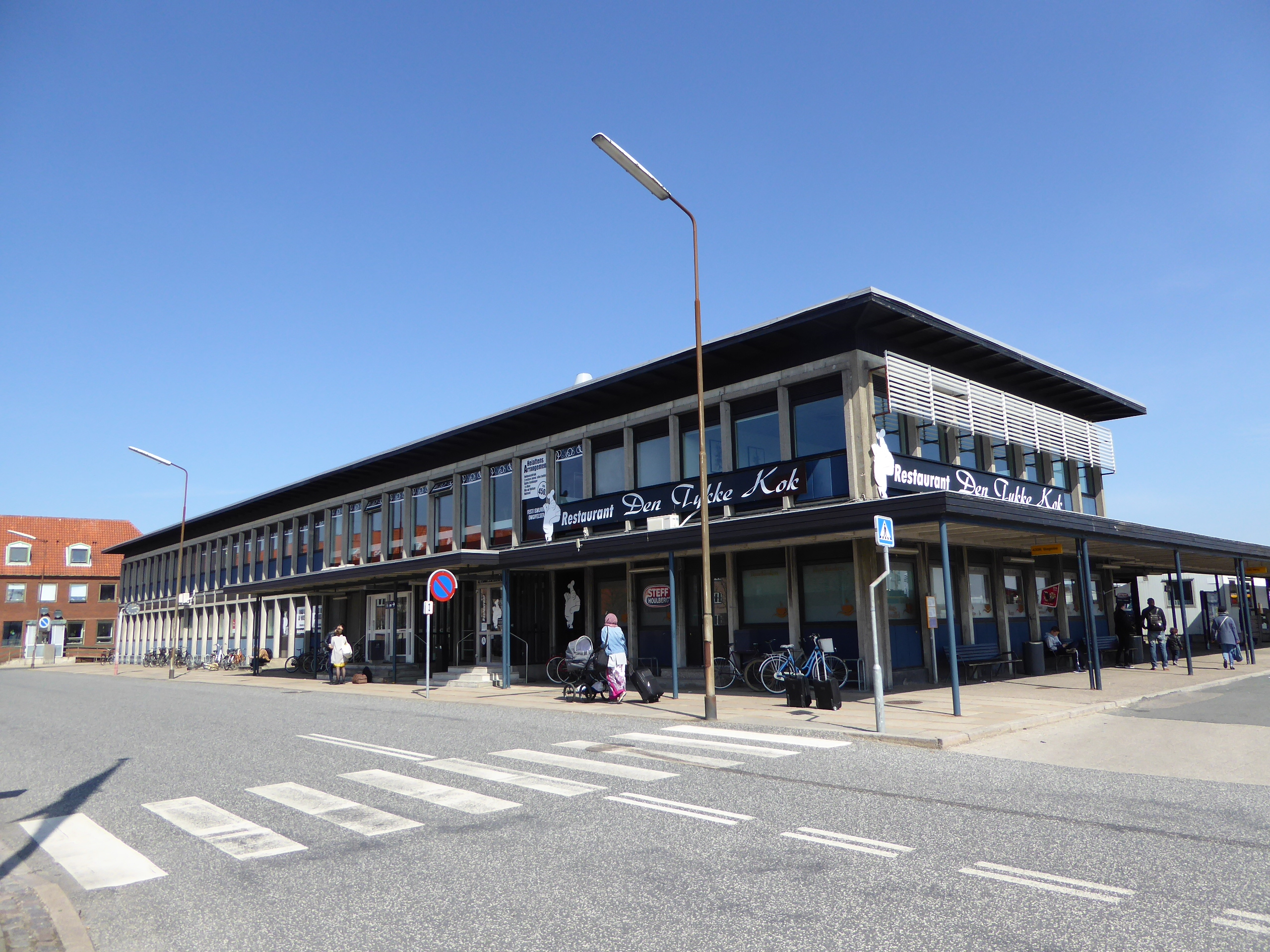
- Street facade of Kalundborg station in 2018

General information
- Location: Banegårdspladsen 2; 4400 Kalundborg; Kalundborg Municipality; Denmark
- Coordinates: 55°40′40.08″N 11°05′20.42″E
- Elevation: 2.0 metres (6 ft 7 in)
- Owner: DSB (station infrastructure); Banedanmark (rail infrastructure)
- Line: Northwest Line
- Platforms: 3
- Tracks: 4
- Train operators: DSB

Construction
- Architect: Adolf Ahrens (1874); Ole Ejnar Bonding (1960)
- Architectural style: Modernism

Other information
- Website: Official website

History
- Opened: 30 December 1874
- Rebuilt: 1960

Services
Preceding station	DSB	Following station
Kalundborg East towards Østerport	Copenhagen–Kalundborg Regional train	Terminus
Location

Kalundborg railway station (Danish: Kalundborg Station or Kalundborg Banegård) is the main railway station serving the town of Kalundborg in northwestern Zealand, Denmark. It is located in the centre of the town, close to the Port of Kalundborg, and immediately adjacent to the Kalundborg bus station and Kalundborg ferry terminal.

Kalundborg station is located on the main line Northwest Line from Roskilde to Kalundborg. The station opened in 1874, and its second and current station building designed by the architect Ole Ejnar Bonding was inaugurated in 1960. It offers direct regional rail services to Holbæk, Roskilde and Copenhagen operated by the national railway company DSB.

== Architecture ==
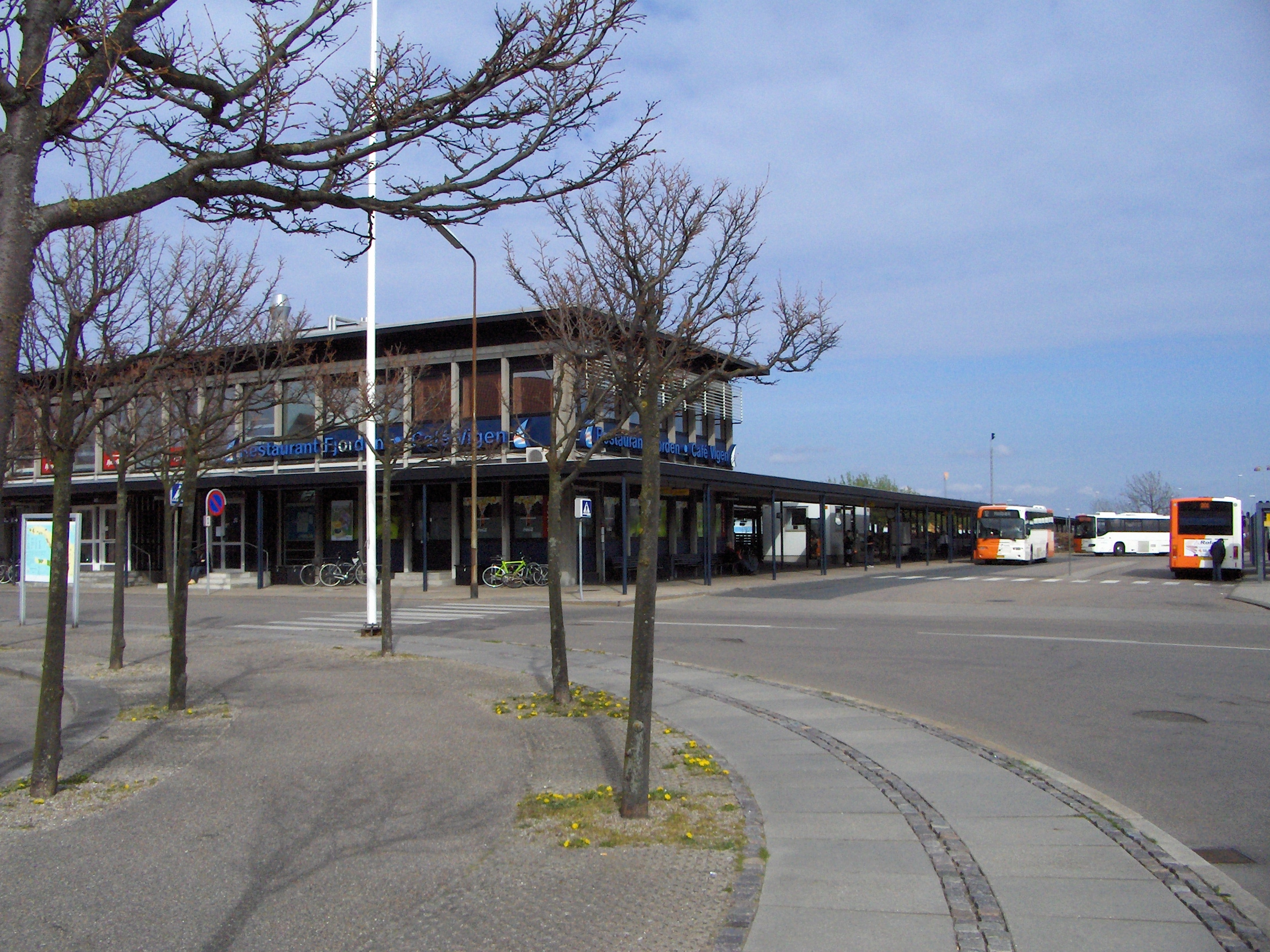
The station building in 2008.

Kalundborg railway station's first station building was built in 1874 to designs by the Danish architect Adolf Ahrens.

The first station building was torn down in 1960 to make way for the second and current station building in modernist style that was built in 1960 to designs by the Danish architect Ole Ejnar Bonding in his capacity of head architect of the Danish State Railways from 1958 to 1979. It is in the same uncompromising modernist architectural style as Bonding's other station buildings in Skive, Nykøbing Falster, Vojens, Brønderslev, Rødekro, Holbæk, Svanemøllen and Herning.

== See also ==
- List of railway stations in Denmark
- Rail transport in Denmark
- History of rail transport in Denmark
- Transportation in Denmark
