= Kalundborg =

- Town
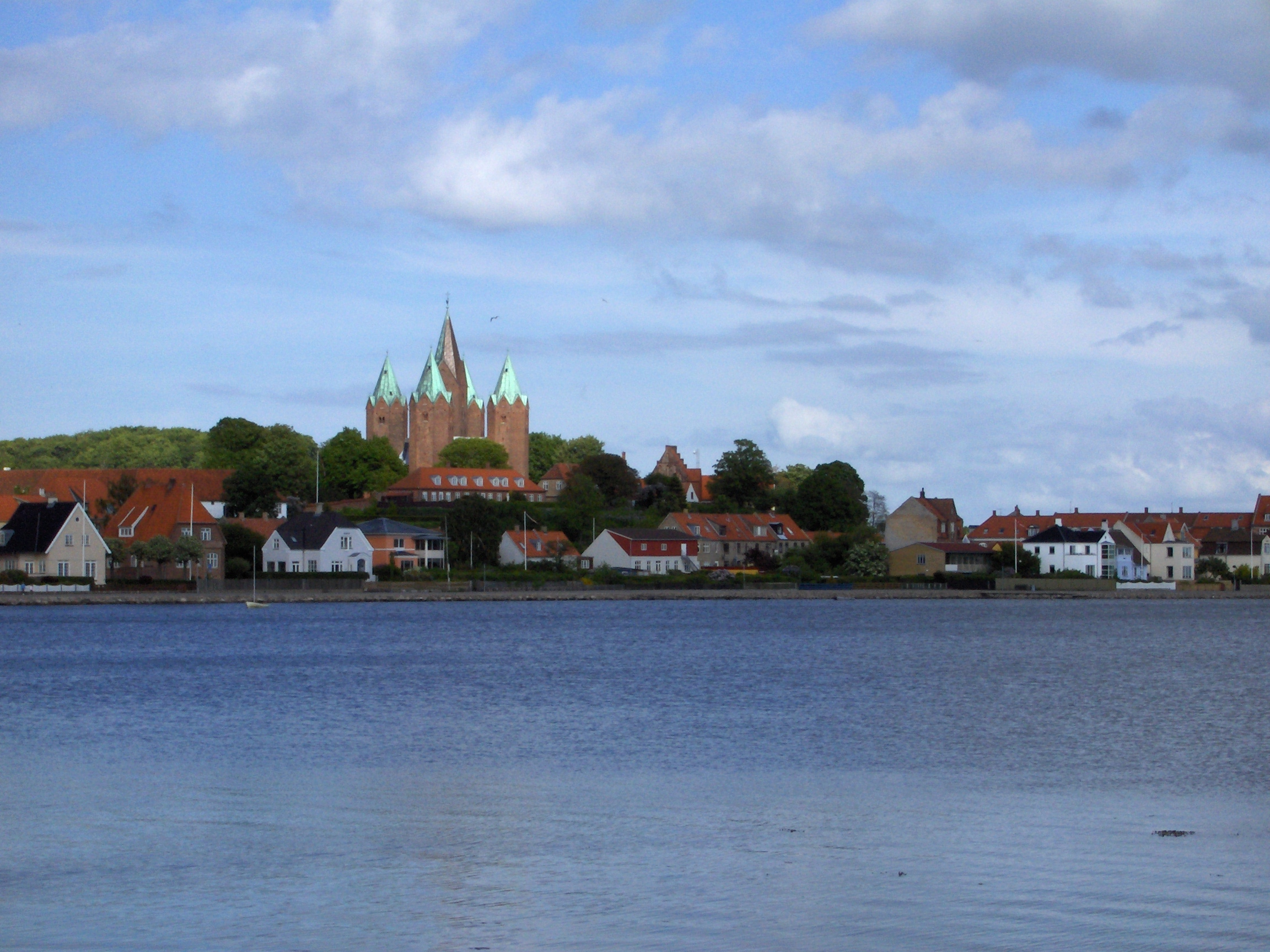
- Seaport town of Kalundborg, Denmark

- Coat of arms

- The location of Kalundborg in Denmark. Kalundborg is west of Copenhagen and Holbæk, northwest of Slagelse on Zealand in Denmark. Kalundborg (Denmark Region Zealand)
- Coordinates: 55°40′53″N 11°5′6″E
- Country: Denmark
- Region: Zealand (Sjælland)
- Municipality: Kalundborg

Area
  - Urban: 17.1 km^{2} (6.6 sq mi)

Population (2026)
  - Urban: 16,466
  - Urban density: 963/km^{2} (2,490/sq mi)
  - Gender: 8,165 males and 8,301 females
- Demonym: Kalundborgenser
- Time zone: UTC+1 (CET)
  - Summer (DST): UTC+2 (CEST)
- Postal code: 4400

Kalundborg (Danish: [kʰælɔnˈpɒˀ]) is a Danish city with a population of 16,466 (1 January 2026), the main town of the municipality of the same name and the site of its municipal council. It is situated on the northwestern coast of the largest Danish island, Zealand (or Sjælland in Danish), on the opposite, eastern side of which lies the capital Copenhagen, 110 km (68 mi) away.

Kalundborg is famous as the location of a large broadcasting facility, the Kalundborg Transmitter. The city was also home to the largest coal-fired power station in Denmark, the Asnæs Power Station, which started its transition to biomass in 2017.

Kalundborg is mainly a trading and industrial town, but is also well known for its five-spired Church of Our Lady, which is closely associated with King Valdemar I and the Archbishop Absalon. The church itself is said to have been built by Absalon's brother, Esbern Snare.

Kalundborg is also the traditional seat of the aristocratic Lerche family. Their stately home, Lerchenborg, the best example of rococo architecture in Denmark, can be seen in the town's outskirts.

Ferries connect Kalundborg westward to the island of Samsø.

== Geography ==
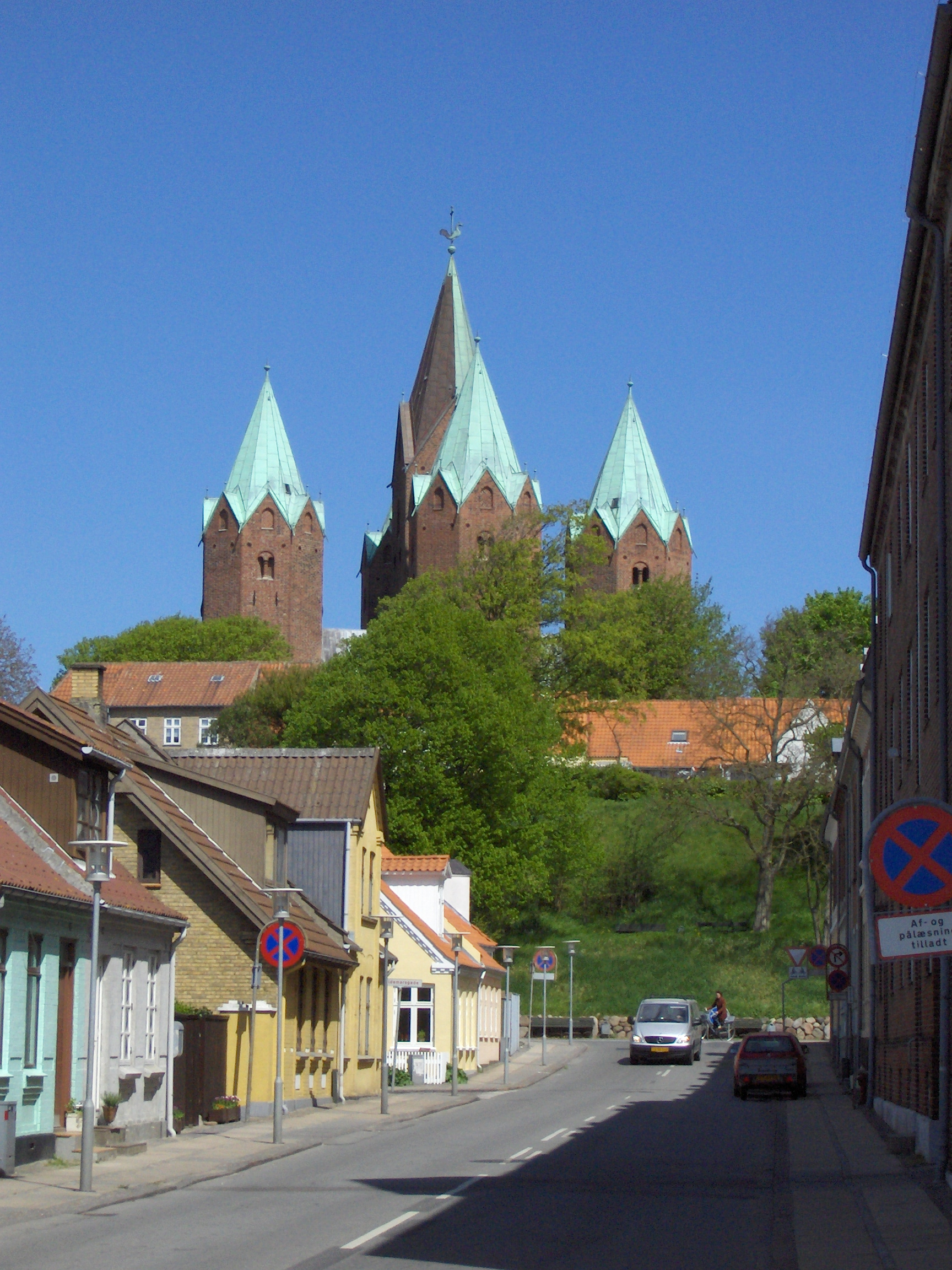
Church of Our Lady in Kalundborg, Denmark

Kalundborg is at latitude 55°41′N, longitude 11°6′E, about 110 km (68 mi) west of Copenhagen on the island of Zealand (Sjaelland).

== History ==
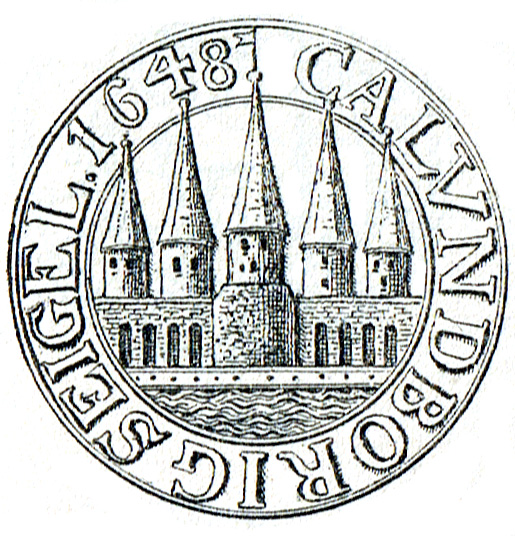
Seal of the city from 1648

The Kalundborg area was first settled in 1170 at a natural harbour at the head of the narrow bay today known as Kalundborg Fjord. It became more urbanized during the nineteenth century and grew into a major industrial centre by the mid-twentieth century.

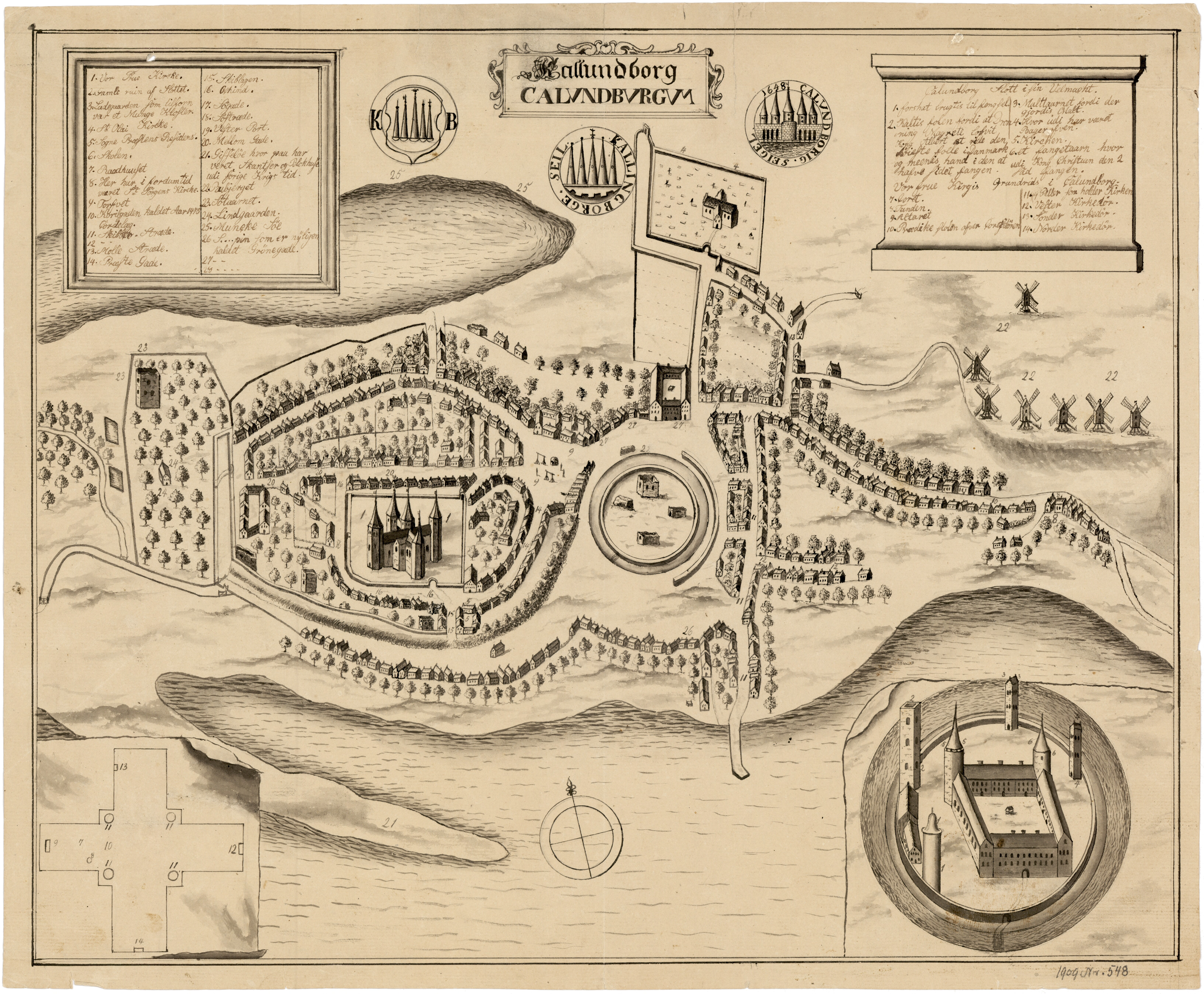
Map of Kalundborg

Kalundborg Municipality has approximately 20,000 inhabitants. Kalundborg industrial symbiosis activities began in 1961 when a project was developed and implemented to use surface water from Lake Tisso for a new oil refinery, to save the limited supplies of ground water. The City of Kalundborg took the responsibility for building the pipeline while the refinery financed it. Starting from this initial collaboration, a number of other collaborative projects were subsequently introduced and the number of partners gradually increased.

By the end of the 1980s, the partners realised that they had effectively "self-organised" into what is probably the best-known example of industrial symbiosis. The material exchanges in the Kalundborg region include conservation of natural and financial resources; reduction in production, material, energy, insurance and treatment costs and liabilities; improved operating efficiency; quality control; improved health of the local population and public image; and realisation of potential income through the sale of by-products and waste materials.

== Economy ==
Kalundborg Municipality is home to approximately 19,000 jobs, of which 13,000 are in the private sector (December 2014). Novo has extensive production facilities in Kalundborg with a total of more than 2,400 employees. Since 1999 they have invested more than DKK 7.5 billions in the complex. Pronova BioPharma Danmark, a bulk manufacturer of Omega-3 products which was acquired by BASF in 2014, also has a manufacturing plant in Kalundborg.

=== Port of Kalundborg ===
The port plays a central role in the town's economy. It is a municipal self-governing port with independent finances. Kalundborg Container Terminal is served by Unifeeder on a weekly basis. Schultz Shipping is a local shipping company. As of 2015, the port is being expanded with a new west harbor on the south side of the Asnæs peninsula.

Statoil Refining Denmark operates Denmark's largest oil refinery on the harbor with a capacity of 6.6 million ton oil products per year. Haldor Topsøe is one of the companies that has facilities at Kalundborg Tank Terminal.

== Transportation ==
=== Rail ===
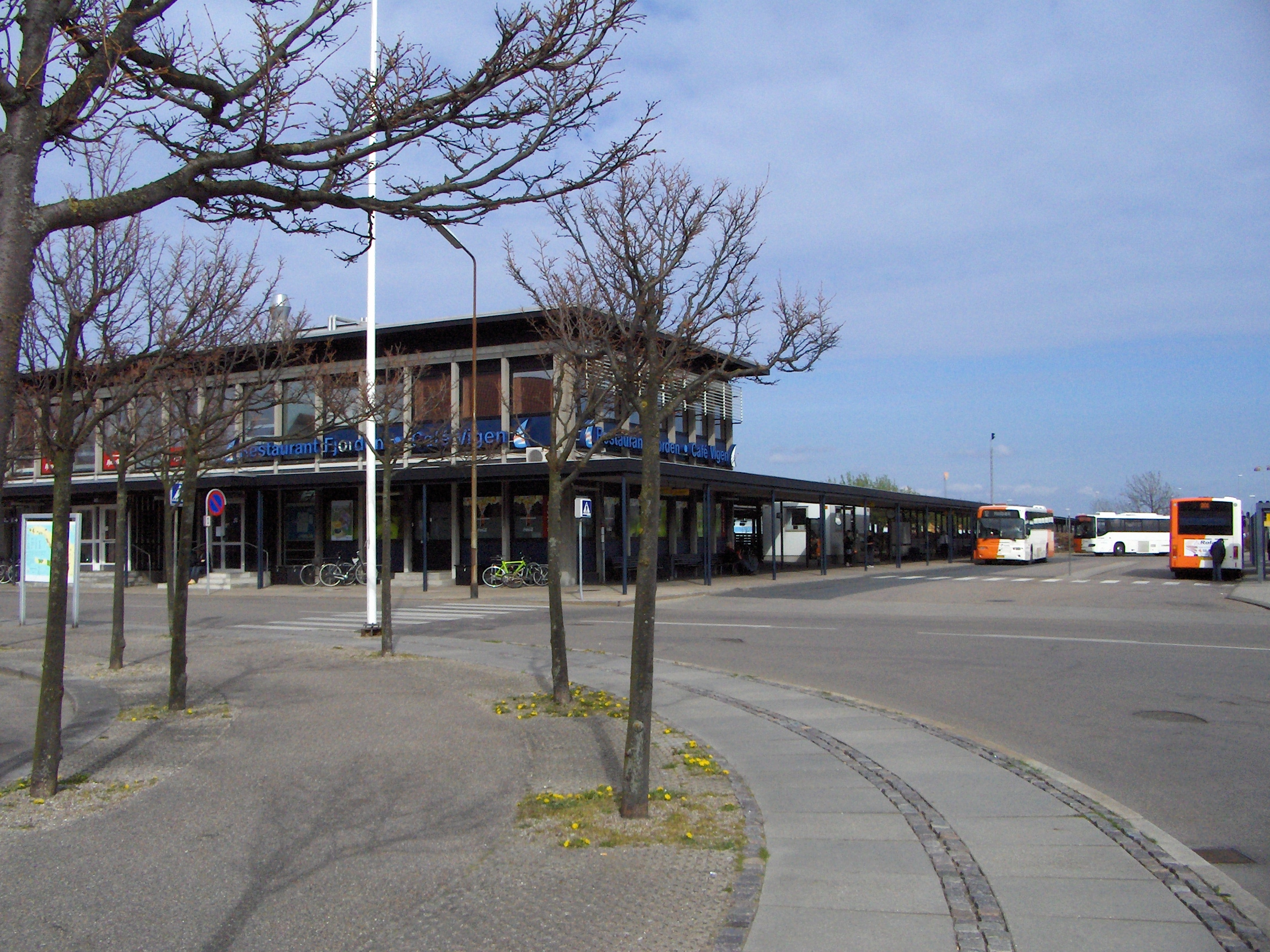
Kalundborg railway station.

The Northwest Line (1874) connects Kalundborg with Holbæk and Roskilde and the rest of the Danish rail network. Kalundborg railway station is the principal railway station of the town and offers frequent direct regional train services to Holbæk, Roskilde and Copenhagen operated by the national railway company DSB. The eastern part of the town is also served by the railway halt Kalundborg East.

=== Air ===
Copenhagen Airport is located 107 km (66 mi) east of Kalundborg and it can easily be reached by train, bus and car. Kalundborg Airfield is also located 15 km (9.3 mi) outside Kalundborg.

== Notable people ==
=== Public service and public thinking ===
- Esbern Snare (1127–1204), crusader; built the Church of Our Lady, Kalundborg
- Christian II of Denmark (1481–1559 in Kalundborg Castle), monarch under the Kalmar Union
- Jørgen Bjelke (1621–1696 in Kalundborg), exiled Norwegian officer and nobleman
- Sophie Amalie Lindenov (1649 in Kalundborg Castle–1688), noblewoman and landowner
- Hans Hagerup Gyldenpalm (1717–1781), Danish born, Norwegian jurist and civil servant
- Arnoldus von Falkenskiold (1743–1819), Danish military officer and landowner of Sæbygård
- Henrik Steffens Hagerup (1806–1859), Norwegian naval officer and politician who served as minister of the Navy
- Wilhelm Hellesen (1836–1892), inventor and industrialist; helped invent the dry cell battery
- Anne Elisabet Jensen (born 1951), Danish politician and MEP
- Professor Claus Manniche (born 1956), Danish rheumatologist, consultant and academic
- Sandra Skalvig (born 1990), Danish MP

=== The arts ===
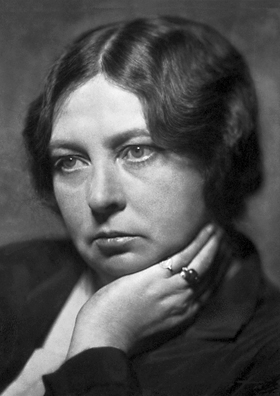
Sigrid Undset, 1928

- Johan Thomas Lundbye (1818–1848), graphic artist and painter of animals and landscapes
- Elisabeth Dons (1864–1942), operatic mezzo-soprano at the Royal Danish Theatre
- Johannes Holbek (1872–1903), Danish painter and graphic artist
- Margrethe Lendrop (1873–1920), operatic soprano at the Royal Danish Theatre
- Sigrid Undset (1882–1949), Norwegian novelist, awarded the Nobel Prize for Literature in 1928, emigrated to Norway aged 2
- Viggo Rørup (1903–1971), Danish artist, joined the artists' colony the Odsherred Painters
- Thøger Birkeland (1922–2011), teacher and writer, known for children's books
- Søren Ulrik Thomsen (born 1956), Danish poet; his debut was City Slang, 1981
- Frank Madsen (born 1962), Danish author, illustrator and comics artist
- Christian E. Christiansen (born 1972), Danish filmmaker
- Jonas Poher Rasmussen, filmmaker

=== Sport ===
- Mogens Guldberg (born 1963), middle-distance runner, competed at the 1988 Summer Olympics
- Claus Nielsen (born 1964), former footballer, almost 200 club caps and 14 for Denmark
- Henrik Djernis (born 1968 in Svebølle), Danish cyclist
- Thomas Damgaard (born 1971), Danish former professional boxer
- Anders Nielsen (born 1972), Danish footballer, over 300 club caps
- Susanne Meyerhoff (born 1974) a Danish sport shooter, competed at the 1996, 2000 and 2004 Summer Olympics
- Thomas Frandsen (born 1976), Danish former footballer, almost 300 club caps
- Jesper Hansen (born 1980), Danish sport shooter, competed at the 2012, 2016 and 2020 Summer Olympics and finished 26th, 5th and 2nd in the men's skeet; he won the skeet shooting world championship in 2013

=== Other ===
- Frida Schou (1891–1980), early businesswoman who ran the brick factory Knabstrup Teglværk from 1928

== See also ==
- Nearby towns: Holbæk, Slagelse, Gørlev, Ruds Vedby, Jyderup, Svinninge, Roskilde
- Nearby islands: Samsø, Sejerø, Funen (Fyn)
- Chronicle of the Expulsion of the Grayfriars § Chapter 14 Concerning the Friary at Kalundborg
- Ports of the Baltic Sea
