= History of rail transport in Denmark =

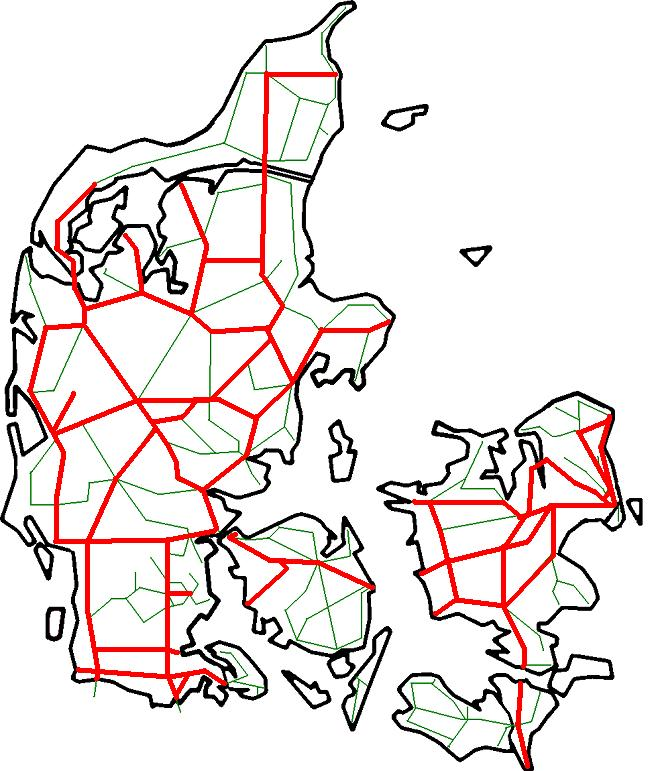
Major railway lines in 1932.

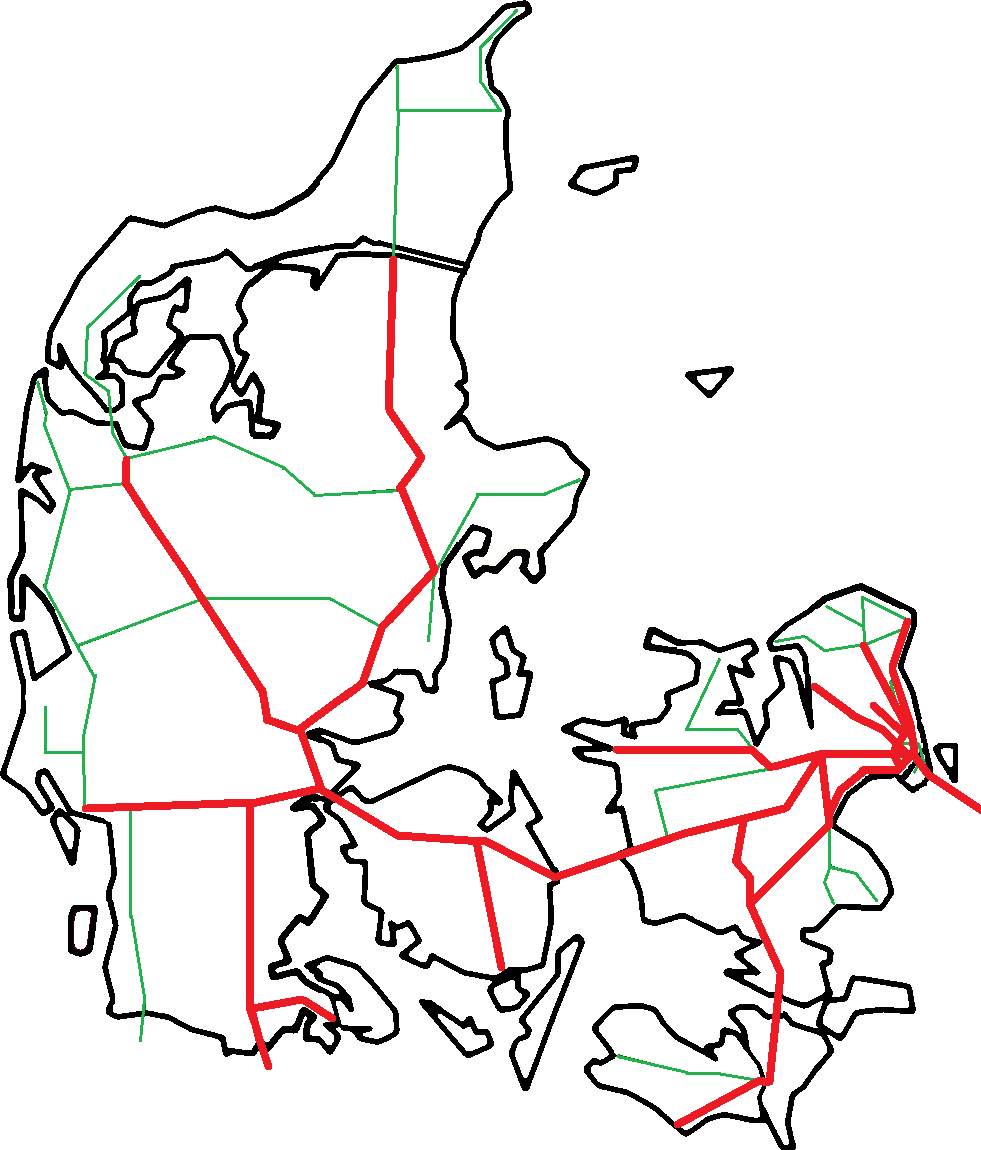
Major railway lines in 2018.

A large part of the main railway lines in Denmark has been steadily privatized and outsourced from state owned (red) to privately owned (green) over the years, in particular in the 1990s. During this process, many lines have been abandoned.

The history of rail transport in Denmark began in 1847 with the opening of a railway line between Copenhagen and Roskilde. The Kiel-Altona line in Holstein was completed three years earlier, but the region was later lost to the German Confederation in the Second War of Schleswig.

The Danish national railway operator, DSB, was established in 1885. Until recently, DSB administered most aspects of rail operations in Denmark proper, but the politically decided privatization efforts during the 1990s, has resulted in several local lines and tasks being outsourced to a number of privately owned companies. The multinational company of Arriva, is currently among the largest of these, operating c. 17% of the Danish rail network.

== Early steps ==
In the 1830s, England and North Germany planned to construct a railway line between the cities of Hamburg and Lübeck to ease transport between the North Sea and the Baltic Sea. The Copenhagen government frowned on this, as they wanted to retain waterway traffic through Øresund, but to preempt these efforts, the Danish government set up the first Danish railway commission in 1835 to establish the layout of a railway line through the Duchy of Holstein. Consequently, the railway between Altona and Kiel was opened by King Christian VIII on 18 September 1844. However, the Duchy of Holstein was only in personal union with Denmark, with the King of Denmark being Duke of Holstein, and as a result of the Second War of Schleswig, Holstein was ceded to the German Confederation in 1864. The railway line was not the first in what constituted Denmark at the time (as Holstein was part of the German Confederation), but it was nonetheless the first to be built under the Danish monarchy.

In 1840, technician Søren Hjorth and accountant Johan Christian Gustav Schram published the paper Jærnbane mellem Kjøbenhavn og Roeskilde, in which they argued that a railway between Copenhagen and Roskilde would be profitable. However, there was no further interest in this project until 1841, when cooperation with Industriforeningen had been established. In 1843, after substantial financial recalculations, they applied for a concession to construct a railway from Copenhagen via Roskilde to a coastal town on West Zealand. This was granted about a year later, albeit not with the same level of governmental economic support as the Kiel-Altona line.

On 2 July 1844 Det Sjællandske Jernbaneselskab (The Railway Company of Zealand) was established with Hjorth and Schram among the board of directors. Amidst considerable resistance from landowners, trouble with unstable labour and excessive expenditures, the economic resources necessary to complete the line were provided, and the Copenhagen-Roskilde line was opened, as the first in Denmark, on 26 June 1847. English engineer William Radford led construction. Sharp Brothers and Company, in Manchester, England, built the initial batch of locomotives, the first of which was named 'Odin'.

== Expanding the main lines ==
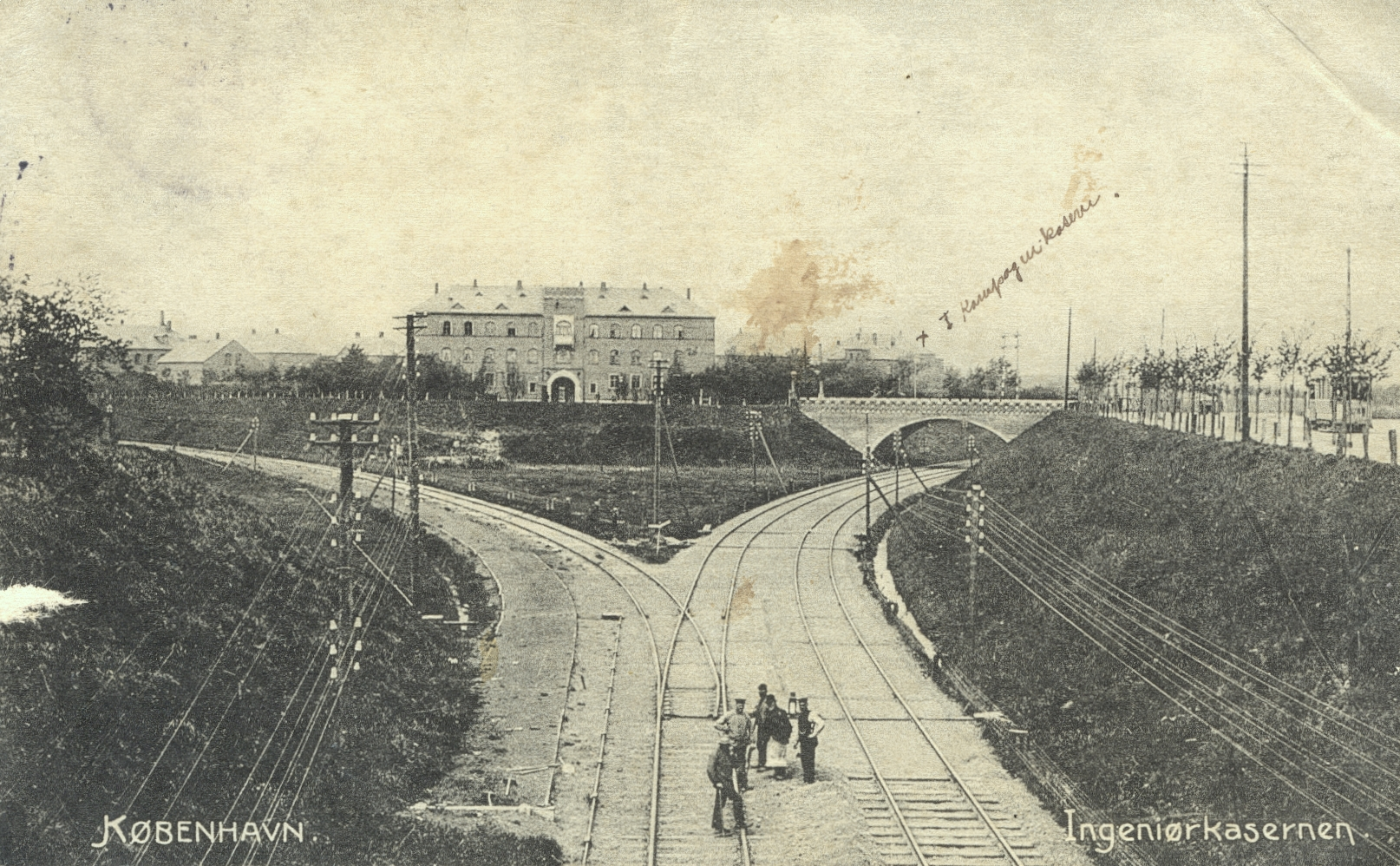
Railway line in Denmark at the turn of the 1900s

Following ratification of the Danish Constitution in 1849, there was political will to improve trade routes to England and provide better connections between Copenhagen and the rest of the country. The primary means for this was to extend the Copenhagen-Roskilde line to Korsør, on the west coast of Zealand. During the 1850s, sufficient funding to extend the line to Korsør was secured, and the new segment was opened on 26 April 1856.

Before the First War of Schleswig, plans had been made in Schleswig to construct a railway from Flensburg, via Husum, to Tönning to limit German influence on trade. However, these plans were hampered by the war and the new political system. In 1852, the construction company Peto, Brassey and Betts (represented in Scandinavia by Samuel Morton Peto) was granted concession to build the line, which opened on 6 October 1854. The railway was very successful, carrying English transit goods until 1857, when the Øresund toll was abolished.

=== Zealand ===
The first railway lines on Zealand was constructed by the privately owned company of "Det Sjællandske Jernbaneselskab" DSJ (lit.: The Zealandic Railway Company), until it was taken over by the state in 1880. This ownership change was not without issues, and in several cases DSJ refused to build additional lines or make necessary upgrades, without financial guaranties. The last lines to be built by DSJ was "Nordvestbanen" (lit.: The Northwest Line) connecting Roskilde, Holbæk and Kalundborg, and "Sydbanen" (lit.: The South Line) connecting Roskilde, Køge, Næstved, Vordingborg and Nykøbing Falster. The last parts of the line on the island of Falster, was sold almost as soon as it opened for traffic.

=== Jutland and Funen ===
In Jutland and on Funen, the state decided on a somewhat different approach to build the railways. Here the state financed and owned the lines and infrastructure right from the start, whilst trusting the daily administration of lines and trains to the private company of "Det danske Jernbanedriftsselskab" (lit.: The Danish Railway Operations Company). In 1862, the first line in Jutland was inaugurated, connecting the towns of Aarhus and Randers. Other lines criss-crossing Jutland north-south and east-west - including the island of Funen -, soon followed. The last railways to be laid, before major changes were made, connected the north–south mainline on the east coast known as "Den Østjydske Længdebane" (lit.: The East Jutlandic Longitude Line) and the north-south mainline on the west coast known as "Den Vestjydske Længdebane" (lit.: The West Jutlandic Longitude Line). The line connected the towns of Lunderskov and the new port of Esbjerg specifically.

By 1880, all major railway lines and companies in Denmark proper, had been bought up by the company of "De Jydsk-Fynske Statsbaner" (lit.: the Jutlandic – Fuenic State Railways) owned by the state and the company of "De Sjællandske Statsbaner" on private hands. In 1885 these two companies merged to form the state owned company of "De Danske Statsbaner" (it.: the Danish State Railways) also known as DSB.

== See also ==
- History of rail transport
- Rail transport in Denmark

== Sources ==
- Koed, Jan (1997): Danmarks Jernbaner i 150 år. Forlaget Kunst og Kultur. ISBN 87-7600-199-7. (in Danish)
