= Banedanmark =

Danish railway infrastructure company

Banedanmark - Rail Net Denmark
- Type: Government agency
- Industry: Rail transport
- Genre: Track (rail transport)
- Predecessor: Banestyrelsen
- Founded: 1997
- Fate: Active
- Headquarters: Copenhagen, Denmark
- Area served: Denmark
- Key people: Jesper Hansen
- Revenue: 885 mio. €
- Total assets: 12.33 bn €
- Number of employees: 2,200 (2012)
- Parent: Danish Ministry of Transport
- Website: www.bane.dk

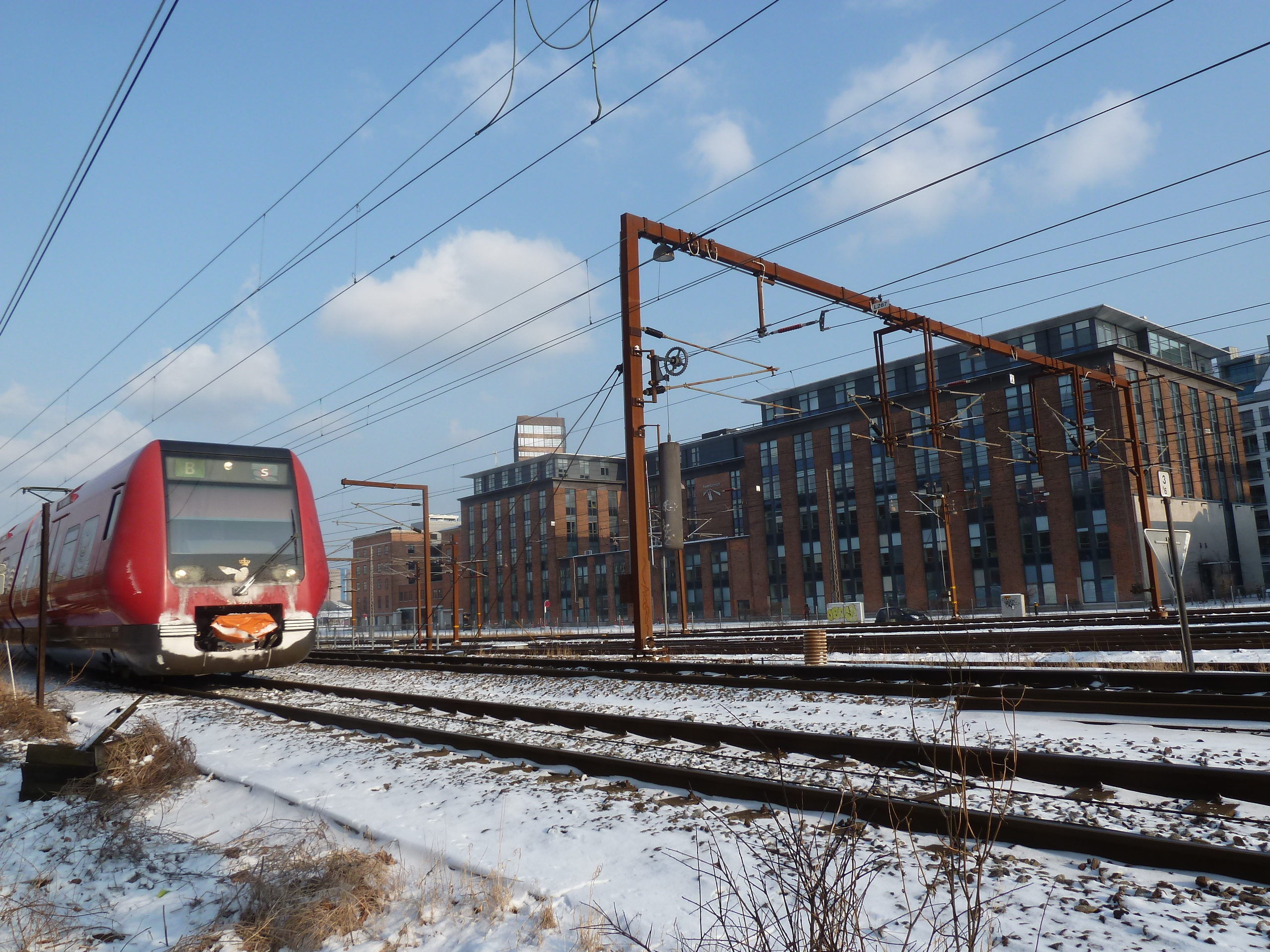
The former headquarters of Banedanmark in Copenhagen

Banedanmark (pronounced [ˈpɛːnəˌtænmɑk]; previously Banestyrelsen) is a Danish agency that is responsible for the maintenance and traffic control on all of the state owned Danish railway network.

== History ==
In 1997, Banedanmark came into existence, having been branched off from DSB as a government agency. Between 2004 and 2010, Banedanmark was a state-owned company that was controlled by the Danish Ministry of Transport. During 2010, Banedanmark was reorganised, once again becoming a government agency under the Danish Ministry of Transport.

One of the first projects overseen by Banedanmark, although most of the construction work had already been completed prior to its creation, was the Øresund Bridge, a combined railway and motorway bridge spanning the Øresund strait between Denmark and Sweden. The bridge, which was recognised under the Trans-European Transport Network (TEN-T) framework as Priority Project 11, was opened to traffic in 1999.

During 2008, Banedanmark announced plans for the conversion of signalling across the entire Danish railway network to European Train Control System (ETCS) Level 2. This measure was necessitated by the near obsolete nature of parts of the network's signalling. In 2009, the Danish government approved funding of €3.3 billion over several years to Banedanmark for the project; at the time, the projected completion date was 2021. This programme makes Denmark the first European country to attempt a complete conversion of a national network to ETCS Level 2. Additional funding for the initiative was provided by the European Union. The resignalling work was put out to competitive tender, and contracts awarded to Thales for Western Denmark and Alstom for Eastern Denmark in July 2012. At the same time, Banedanmark was also undertaking the progressive electrification of several unelectrified lines; accordingly, the organisation originally planned for the ETCS rollout to be synchronised with these electrification efforts as to minimise cost and the infrastructure changes required.

However, during the late 2010s, the ETCS programme reportedly ran into issues with the retrofitting of existing rolling stock to use the new signalling system; the IC3 fleet of long distance diesel multiple units proved to be a particular source of problems, thus the end date of the rollout was postponed considerably. Freight operators were also reportedly unable to upgrade some of their locomotives to be ETCS compatible yet. These difficulties were in part compounded by the sweeping scale of the programme; no other nation had attempted such a conversion before and was regarded as one of the largest resignalling schemes in the world. During August 2022, it was announced that work to replace legacy signalling with ETCS on the Holstebro - Herning and Vejle - Skanderborg lines in Jutland had been completed; it was anticipated that the ETCS rollout would continue through to 2030. Advantages of the new signalling included better train punctuality, more stable operation, and more detailed traffic information.

Another major undertaking involving the agency was the Fehmarn Belt fixed link, a immersed tunnel between the Danish island of Lolland with the German island of Fehmarn; it is one part of the wider Priority Project 20 of the Trans-European Transport Network (TEN-T), which shall construct a high-speed rail line between Copenhagen and Hamburg. The full line consists of several railway lines, both new-build and upgraded existing ones, that will facilitate trains travelling at minimum top speed of 200 km/h across all sections. These include the Copenhagen–Ringsted Line, which was opened on 31 May 2019 and will be upgraded to 250 km/h operations in 2023, the Sydbanen (Ringsted–Rødbyhavn), to be electrified and suitable for 200 km/h operations by 2024, and the Fehmarn Belt Tunnel (Rødbyhavn–Puttgarden) itself, which is projected to be completed during 2028.

In the 2010s, it was decided to roll out communications-based train control (CBTC) on the S-Bahn suburban rail network serving Copenhagen. The benefits of this system, which is to be certified to operate at Grade of Automation 4 (GoA4), facilitates full automation of the network, more accurate passenger information, and enables the driverless operation of trains, although this latter benefit is not expected to occur much before 2037. During September 2022, Banedanmark announced the installation of CBTC equipment across the S-Bane had been completed, although some work remained to fully commission all of its capabilities.
