= 2025 Holbæk municipal election =

Municipal election in Denmark

← 2021	18 November 2025	2029 →

All 31 seats to the Holbæk municipal council 16 seats needed for a majority
- Turnout: 42,159 (70.3%) ▲0.2%
	First party	Second party	Third party
	A	V	Æ
Party	Social Democrats	Venstre	Denmark Democrats
Last election	19 seats, 59.0%	5 seats, 15.4%	Did not stand
Seats won	18	3	2
Seat change	▼1	▼2	▲2
Popular vote	21,771	4,505	2,549
Percentage	52.3%	10.8%	6.1%
Swing	▼6.7%	▼4.5%	New
	Fourth party	Fifth party	Sixth party
	F	I	O
Party	Green Left	Liberal Alliance	Danish People's Party
Last election	1 seat, 2.8%	0 seats, 1.3%	1 seat, 4.3%
Seats won	2	2	1
Seat change	▲1	▲2	0
Popular vote	2,164	2,122	2,012
Percentage	5.2%	5.1%	4.8%
Swing	▲2.4%	▲3.8%	▲0.5%
	Seventh party	Eighth party	Ninth party
	Ø	C	B
Party	Red-Green Alliance	Conservatives	Social Liberals
Last election	1 seat, 4.1%	2 seats, 5.7%	1 seat, 4.3%
Seats won	1	1	1
Seat change	0	▼1	0
Popular vote	2,012	1,681	1,413
Percentage	4.8%	4.0%	3.4%
Swing	▲0.7%	▼1.6%	▼1.0%
Mayor before election
Christina Krzyrosiak Hansen
Social Democrats
Mayor after election
Christina Krzyrosiak Hansen
Social Democrats

The 2025 Holbæk Municipal election was held on November 18, 2025, to elect the 31 members to sit in the regional council for the Holbæk Municipal council, in the period of 2026 to 2029. Christina Krzyrosiak Hansen from the Social Democrats, would secure re-election. The results was the only municipality where the Social Democrats would win an absolute majority.

== Background ==
Following the 2021 election, Christina Krzyrosiak Hansen from Social Democrats became mayor for her second term. The result was seen as remarkable, as the Social Democrats won roughly 59%, an improvement of 30.3% compared to the 2017 election. Krzyrosiak Hansen also managed to 18,590 personal votes, the second highest number of personal votes of the 98 municipal elections held in 2021, despite Holbæk only having 19th largest population of the 98 municipalities in Denmark. Krzyrosiak Hansen would run for a third term.

== Electoral system ==
For elections to Danish municipalities, a number varying from 9 to 31 are chosen to be elected to the municipal council. The seats are then allocated using the D'Hondt method and a closed list proportional representation.

Holbæk Municipality had 31 seats in 2025.

== Electoral alliances ==
=== Electoral Alliance 1 ===
Party		Political alignment
A	Social Democrats	Centre-left
B	Social Liberals	Centre to Centre-left
N	Ny Holbæk	Local politics

=== Electoral Alliance 2 ===
Party		Political alignment
C	Conservatives	Centre-right
I	Liberal Alliance	Centre-right to Right-wing
O	Danish People's Party	Right-wing to Far-right
Æ	Denmark Democrats	Right-wing to Far-right

=== Electoral Alliance 3 ===
Party		Political alignment
F	Green Left	Centre-left to Left-wing
Ø	Red-Green Alliance	Left-wing to Far-Left
Å	The Alternative	Centre-left to Left-wing

=== Electoral Alliance 4 ===
Party		Political alignment
M	Moderates	Centre to Centre-right
V	Venstre	Centre-right

== Results by polling station ==
Division	A	B	C	F	I	M	N	O	V	Æ	Ø	Å
Division	%	%	%	%	%	%	%	%	%	%	%	%
Holbæk Øst	53.0	5.9	4.4	6.2	4.5	1.1	1.2	3.0	11.6	3.1	5.6	0.5
Holbæk Vest	56.3	4.4	3.3	6.1	3.7	1.1	1.1	4.6	9.9	3.0	6.0	0.4
Holbæk Midt	56.8	3.7	4.0	5.7	5.0	0.9	1.2	3.7	10.5	2.9	4.9	0.5
Vipperød	52.5	2.6	4.6	5.1	5.8	1.3	2.8	4.4	11.8	4.7	4.1	0.3
Tuse	58.3	3.1	3.0	4.5	5.8	0.7	1.1	3.5	10.6	6.3	3.0	0.1
Udby	55.3	2.0	2.5	4.6	6.0	0.8	1.9	4.8	11.0	6.5	4.2	0.3
Tølløse	53.8	2.6	2.9	6.2	4.8	1.7	2.9	4.5	9.8	5.0	5.1	0.7
St. Merløse	45.0	0.9	3.1	4.8	6.4	0.7	5.5	7.0	9.5	8.2	8.0	0.9
Regstrup	43.9	2.1	2.9	3.5	5.8	1.4	1.7	4.6	22.0	7.6	4.3	0.3
Undløse	48.0	0.7	4.2	3.6	5.1	1.0	3.0	7.4	13.4	9.4	4.1	0.2
Jyderup	47.5	7.1	11.8	5.0	3.6	0.7	0.7	5.5	8.3	5.5	4.1	0.3
Mørkøv	51.6	1.4	3.7	4.2	5.9	1.0	1.6	7.5	9.0	8.2	5.9	0.1
Svinninge	52.3	1.9	2.6	3.7	4.6	0.7	1.4	7.0	7.5	15.4	2.5	0.3
Gislinge	44.7	1.0	2.1	3.2	9.6	0.9	1.8	6.6	9.2	18.0	2.7	0.2
Orø	50.6	2.4	2.8	11.6	2.1	0.7	1.6	4.6	3.3	5.7	5.8	8.8

== Results ==
Party		Votes	%	+/-	Seats	+/-
Holbæk Municipality
A	Social Democrats	21,771	52.32	-6.67	18	-1
V	Venstre	4,505	10.83	-4.53	3	-2
Æ	Denmark Democrats	2,549	6.13	New	2	New
F	Green Left	2,164	5.20	+2.40	2	+1
I	Liberal Alliance	2,122	5.10	+3.80	2	+2
O	Danish People's Party	2,012	4.84	+0.50	1	0
Ø	Red-Green Alliance	2,012	4.84	+0.71	1	0
C	Conservatives	1,681	4.04	-1.65	1	-1
B	Social Liberals	1,413	3.40	-0.95	1	0
N	Ny Holbæk	735	1.77	New	0	New
M	Moderates	429	1.03	New	0	New
Å	The Alternative	219	0.53	New	0	New
Total		41,612	100	N/A	31	N/A
Invalid votes		128	0.21	-0.11		
Blank votes		419	0.70	+0.16		
Turnout		42,159	70.32	+0.17		
Source: valg.dk

== Opinion polls ==
Polling firm	Fieldwork date	Sample size	A	V	C	B	O	Ø	F	I	M	N	Æ	Å	Others	Lead
Epinion	4 Sep - 13 Oct 2025	602	57.7	9.1	2.9	1.1	6.4	4.0	6.6	4.7	0.8	–	5.6	0.3	0.8	48.6
2024 european parliament election	9 Jun 2024		17.8	14.7	7.2	5.9	8.0	6.0	17.8	6.2	6.6	–	7.8	1.9	–	0.0
2022 general election	1 Nov 2022		31.2	11.7	3.8	2.3	3.6	3.4	11.7	6.5	10.9	–	7.6	1.9	–	19.5
2021 regional election	16 Nov 2021		41.9	23.2	7.2	5.0	4.9	5.9	5.1	1.5	–	–	–	0.2	–	18.7
2021 municipal election	16 Nov 2021		59.0 (19)	15.4 (5)	5.7 (2)	4.3 (1)	4.3 (1)	4.1 (1)	2.8 (1)	1.3 (0)	–	–	–	–	–	43.6
