= 2021 Holbæk municipal election =

← 2017	16 November 2021	2025 →

All 31 seats to the Holbæk Municipal Council 16 seats needed for a majority
- Turnout: 40,511 (70.2%) ▼3.0pp
	First party	Second party	Third party
	A	V	C
Party	Social Democrats	Venstre	Conservatives
Last election	9 seats, 28.7%	6 seats, 20.1%	1 seat, 3.9%
Seats won	19	5	2
Seat change	▲10	▼1	▲1
Popular vote	23,586	6,139	2,274
Percentage	59.0%	15.4%	5.7%
Swing	▲30.3%	▼4.7%	▲1.8%
	Fourth party	Fifth party	Sixth party
	B	O	Ø
Party	Social Liberals	Danish People's Party	Red–Green Alliance
Last election	3 seats, 9.7%	4 seats, 13.4%	2 seats, 5.5%
Seats won	1	1	1
Seat change	▼2	▼3	▼1
Popular vote	1,739	1,734	1,651
Percentage	4.4%	4.3%	4.1%
Swing	▼5.3%	▼9.1%	▼1.4%
	Seventh party	Eighth party	Ninth party
	D	F	I
Party	New Right	Green Left	Liberal Alliance
Last election	Did Not Stand	1 seat, 2.8%	2 seats, 6.1%
Seats won	1	1	0
Seat change	▲1	0	▼2
Popular vote	1,221	1,120	520
Percentage	3.0%	2.8%	1.3%
Swing	New	0.0%	▼4.8%
Mayor before election
Christina Krzyrosiak Hansen
Social Democrats
Mayor after election
Christina Krzyrosiak Hansen
Social Democrats

Following the 2017 election, Christina Krzyrosiak Hansen from the Social Democrats had become mayor, after an agreement between the Green Left, Danish People's Party and the Red–Green Alliance.

In 2017, DR published an article naming Holbæk Municipality as the country's poorest municipality In 2020, TV2 Øst could reveal that things were improving in the municipality. The year before, Zetland had also made an article explaining that Holbæk had improved a lot since the new mayor.

These things would appear to have gained support for the continuation of Christina Krzyrosiak Hansen as mayor. The results would see the Social Democrats going from 9 seats, to 19 seats, 4 more than needed for an absolute majority. Christina Krzyrosiak Hansen would become the candidate to receive the 2nd highest number of personal votes in the 2017 Danish local elections, despite Holbæk only having 19th largest population of the 98 Danish municipalities. This would make an easy pathway for her to continue as mayor.

== Electoral system ==
For elections to Danish municipalities, a number varying from 9 to 31 are chosen to be elected to the municipal council. The seats are then allocated using the D'Hondt method and a closed list proportional representation. Holbæk Municipality had 31 seats in 2021

Unlike in Danish General Elections, in elections to municipal councils, electoral alliances are allowed.

== Electoral alliances ==
=== Electoral Alliance 1 ===
Party		Political alignment
A	Social Democrats	Centre-left
O	Danish People's Party	Right-wing to Far-right

=== Electoral Alliance 2 ===
Party		Political alignment
B	Social Liberals	Centre to Centre-left
C	Conservatives	Centre-right

=== Electoral Alliance 3 ===
Party		Political alignment
D	New Right	Right-wing to Far-right
I	Liberal Alliance	Centre-right to Right-wing

=== Electoral Alliance 4 ===
Party		Political alignment
F	Green Left	Centre-left to Left-wing
Ø	Red–Green Alliance	Left-wing to Far-Left

== Results by polling station ==
Division	A	B	C	D	F	I	O	V	Ø
Division	%	%	%	%	%	%	%	%	%
Holbæk Øst	57.8	8.5	6.5	2.3	3.4	1.3	2.8	13.6	3.7
Holbæk Vest	65.1	4.7	5.3	2.4	2.6	1.0	3.0	11.6	4.3
Holbæk Midt	63.7	3.9	6.7	2.5	3.5	1.1	2.1	11.9	4.5
Vipperød	60.2	2.9	5.3	3.1	2.8	1.3	3.3	18.2	2.9
St. Merløse	50.5	6.1	5.0	4.5	2.9	1.0	7.8	14.3	7.9
Tølløse	60.3	3.4	4.7	3.6	3.3	1.8	5.2	12.9	4.8
Udby	60.2	2.9	4.6	3.5	2.5	2.3	4.6	15.2	4.3
Tuse	62.7	3.7	6.5	2.6	2.2	1.4	2.8	15.6	2.5
Regstrup	42.7	4.4	5.6	3.3	3.4	1.2	2.9	31.4	5.0
Undløse	52.2	4.1	7.2	4.1	2.6	1.1	6.8	17.7	4.2
Jyderup	57.5	1.7	8.6	2.5	2.3	0.7	9.9	13.0	3.8
Mørkøv	57.1	4.6	4.6	4.1	1.7	1.6	6.5	15.6	4.2
Orø	63.7	1.4	4.1	4.1	5.6	0.8	5.1	6.7	8.4
Gislinge	54.6	1.8	3.9	4.0	1.7	2.2	4.1	24.6	3.1
Svinninge	67.3	1.5	2.8	3.0	1.7	1.3	5.5	14.6	2.4

== Results ==
Party		Votes	%	+/-	Seats	+/-
Holbæk Municipality
A	Social Democrats	23,586	58.99	+30.25	19	+10
V	Venstre	6,139	15.35	-4.79	5	-1
C	Conservatives	2,274	5.69	+1.82	2	+1
B	Social Liberals	1,739	4.35	-5.32	1	-2
O	Danish People's Party	1,734	4.34	-9.12	1	-3
Ø	Red-Green Alliance	1,651	4.13	-1.37	1	-1
D	New Right	1,221	3.05	New	1	New
F	Green Left	1,120	2.80	-0.05	1	0
I	Liberal Alliance	520	1.30	-4.81	0	-2
Total		39,984	100	N/A	31	N/A
Invalid votes		188	0.33	+0.10		
Blank votes		339	0.59	-0.49		
Turnout		40,511	70.16	-3.57		
Source: valg.dk
