= Listed buildings in Holbæk Municipality =

This is a list of listed buildings in Holbæk Municipality, Denmark.

== The list ==
=== 4300 Holbæk ===
Listing name	Image	Location	Coordinates	Description
Bakkekammen 23		Bakkekammen 23, 4300 Holbæk		L-shaped house from 1912 designed by Ivar Bentson. The two wings, form two of three wings of a largely symmetrical complex.
Bakkekammen 23		Bakkekammen 23, 4300 Holbæk		One-storey, southern outbuilding wing of the three-winged complex. It was in 1920 expanded with a greenhouse towards the south.
Bakkekammen 23		Bakkekammen 23, 4300 Holbæk		Free-standing, L-shaped outbuilding from 1920 built to the north of the three winged complex in 1920.
Bakkekammen 40		Bakkekammen 40, 4300 Holbæk	1835	House from 1917 designed by Ivar Bentsen and Marius Pedersen
Bakkekammen 40		Bakkekammen 40, 4300 Holbæk	1835	Garage from 1917 designed by Ivar Bentsen and Marius Pedersen
Bakkekammen 40		Bakkekammen 40, 4300 Holbæk	1835	Outbuilding from 1917 designed by Ivar Bentsen and Marius Pedersen
Bakkekammen 40		Bakkekammen 40, 4300 Holbæk	1835	Garden pavilion
Bakkekammen 45		Bakkekammen 45, 4300 Holbæk	1835	Marius Pedersen øs own home built in 1929 in the style known as Bedre Byggeskik.
Bakkekammen 45		Bakkekammen 45, 4300 Holbæk	1835	Garage.
Diget 24		Diget 24, 4300 Holbæk	1922	House from 1922 designed by Ivar Bentsen
Hagestedgård		Nykøbingvej 84, 4300 Holbæk	1835	Main building, consisting of a one, storey, half timbered building from 1748 and the remains of a tower from 1555
Hagestedgård		Nykøbingvej 84, 4300 Holbæk	1835	Two pavilions located on the north side of the central courtyard
Hagestedgård		Nykøbingvej 84A, 4300 Holbæk	1835	The western of two L-shaped, one-storey buildings located on the east side of the central courtyard
Hagestedgård		Nykøbingvej 84B, 4300 Holbæk	1835	The western of two L-shaped, one-storey buildings located on the east side of the central courtyard
Holbæk Barracks		Kasernevej 43, 4300 Holbæk	1913	Eksercerhuset:: Drill house from 1913 by Olaf Petri and Egil Fischer situated on the east side of the central drill grounds.
Holbæk Barracks		Kasernevej 77, 4300 Holbæk	1913	Ridehuset: Equestrian building 1913 by Olaf Petri and Egil Fischer situated on the west side of the central drill grounds.
Holbæk Elefant Apotek		Ahlgade 32, 4300 Holbæk		Building from c. 1800 which was altered in 1847 and extended towards the yard in 1889
Holbæk Elefant Apotek		Bysøstræde 1, 4300 Holbæk		Two-storey side wing from the 18th century which was adapted in 1857 and one-storey extension with two-storey eastern side wing from 1889
Holbæk Elefant Apotek		Bagstræde 1, 4300 Holbæk	1913	Ice houseextension
Holbæk Museum		Klosterstræde 16, 4300 Holbæk	1670	One-storey, halftimbered building fronting the street from 1669-70
Holbæk Museum		Klosterstræde 16, 4300 Holbæk	1670	One-storey, half-timberedm building to the rear from 1669-70
Holbæk Museum		Klosterstræde 16, 4300 Holbæk	1913	Two-storey, half-timbered building originally situated on Algade
Holbæk Priory (Sortebrødreklosteret)		Klosterstræde 7, 4300 Holbæk		The priory's west wing from the 14th century and the south wing which also dates from the 14th century but was adapted in 1783, 1863 and 1916
Holbæk Seminarium		Seminarieparken 2, 4300 Holbæk	1965	Three-storey building from 1965 designed by Gehrdt Bornebusch, Max Brüel and Jørgen Selchau.
Holbæk Seminarium		Seminarieparken 9, 4300 Holbæk	1965	One'storey building with student housing from 1965 designed by Gehrdt Bornebusch, Max Brüel and Jørgen Selchau.
Holbæk's 2nd town hall		Klosterstræde 18, 4300 Holbæk	1744	Former town hall with extension and side wing from 1844 designed by Frederik Ferdinand Friis
Old Town Hall		Rådhuspladsen 1, 4300 Holbæk	1914	Combined town hall and jailhouse with surrounding walls from 1909-1911 designed by Vilh. Fischer and Jens Møller-Jensen
Kapellanboligen		Kirkestræde 2B, 4300 Holbæk		10-bay, one-storey, half-timbered house from c. 1600 located adjacent to St. Nicolas' churchyard.
Roskildevej 17 C		Roskildevej 17C, 4300 Holbæk	1914	Three-winged former nursing home from 1914 designed by Ivar Bentsen.
Søndersted Stubmølle		Kalundborgvej 58A, 4300 Holbæk	c. 1700	Post mill from c. 1700 which was moved in 1875 and again in 1938,
Tuse Kro		Tuse Byvej 100, 4300 Holbæk	1755	For, er roadside inn from 1755. The thatched, half-timbered building was originally 16 bays long but was shortened to 13 bays in connection with a road expansion in 1962.

=== 4340 Tølløse ===
Listing name	Image	Location	Coordinates	Description
Brorfelde Observatory		Observator Gyldenkernes Vej 3, Holbæk		
Brorfelde Observatory		Observator Gyldenkernes Vej 3, Holbæk		
Brorfelde Observatory		Observator Gyldenkernes Vej 5, Holbæk		
Brorfelde Observatory		Observator Gyldenkernes Vej 5, Holbæk		
Brorfelde Observatory		Observator Gyldenkernes Vej 5, Holbæk		
Brorfelde Observatory		Observator Gyldenkernes Vej 7, Holbæk		
Brorfelde Observatory		Observator Gyldenkernes Vej 9, Holbæk		
Brorfelde Observatory		Observator Gyldenkernes Vej 11, Holbæk		
Brorfelde Observatory		Observator Gyldenkernes Vej 13, Holbæk		
Brorfelde Observatory		Observator Gyldenkernes Vej 15, Holbæk		
Brorfelde Observatory		Observator Gyldenkernes Vej 15, Holbæk		
Brorfelde Observatory		Observator Gyldenkernes Vej 17, Holbæk		
Brorfelde Observatory		Observator Gyldenkernes Vej 19, Holbæk		
Brorfelde Observatory		Observator Gyldenkernes Vej 21, Holbæk		
Brorfelde Observatory		Observator Gyldenkernes Vej 23, Holbæk		
Soderup Hospital		Bukkerupvej 14, 4340 Tølløse	18th century	Hospital building from the middle of the 18th century
Undløse Downer House		Holbækvej 1, 4340 Tølløse		Downer house from 1846.
Undløse Downer House		Holbækvej 1, 4340 Tølløse		Rear wing.

=== 4450 Jyderup ===
Listing name	Image	Location	Coordinates	Description
Aggersvold		Aggersvoldvej 21, 4450 Jyderup	1835	Main building built in 1833-35 but altered in 1919 and 1979
Hjembæk Kirkelade		Præstevænget 2, 4450 Jyderup		Church barn dating from the late Middle Ages with later alterations.
Hjembæk Rectory		Præstevænget 4, 4450 Jyderup		27-bay residential main wing dating from c. 1700. It is located on the north side of a cobbled courtyard with a large linden tree. and the east gable is integrated in the wall around the churchyard. A short appendix projects from the north side of the building.
Hjembæk Rectory		Præstevænget 4, 4450 Jyderup	c.	15-bay outbuilding located on the west side of the cobbled courtyard.
Hjembæk Rectory		Præstevænget 4, 4450 Jyderup	c.	39-bay stable wing located on the south side of the cobbled courtyard. The stone plinth is significantly taller towards the garden as a result of the sloping character of the site.wing

=== 4370 Store Merløse ===
Listing name	Image	Location	Coordinates	Description
Store Tåstrup Rectory		Tåstrupvej 54, 4370 Store Merløse	1701	Three-winged main building from 1701 and later

=== 4390 Vipperød ===
Listing name	Image	Location	Coordinates	Description
Eriksholm Castle		Eriksholmvej 40, 4390 Vipperød		Neoclassical manor house from 1788

=== 4420 Regstrup ===
Listing name	Image	Location	Coordinates	Description
Knabstrup Manor		Knabstrupvej 51, 4420 Regstrup	1861	Two-storey main building from 1861-62 designed by Vilhelm Dahlerup.
Knabstrup Manor		Knabstrupvej 49, 4420 Regstrup	17th century	Three-winged, half-timbered complex of farm buildings dating from the 17th century but adapted in connection with the construction of the main building in 1861-62.
Løvenborg		Løvenborg Alle 30, 4420 Regstrup	1630s	Three-winged main building with corner towers from the 1630s /modernized in the 18th century), extension to the south wing from 1853 and staircase tower between the south and west wings from the 1890s
Nørre Jernløse Windmill		Møllebakken 2A, 4420 Regstrup		Smock mill moved from Copenhagen's North Rampart in the late 19th century
Vognserup		Vognserup 3, 4420 Regstrup	c. 1570	Main building from c. 1559-75

=== 4440 Mørkøv ===
Listing name	Image	Location	Coordinates	Description
Dorthealyst (9)		Knabstrup Møllebakke 4A-B and 6, 4440 Mørkøv	1835	Widow seat from 1799-1802 by Philip Lange
Kongsdal		Kongsdalvej 5A, 4440 Mørkøv	1598	Three-winged main building from 1598
Skamstrup Rectory		Grydebjergvej 9, 4440 Mørkøv		Neoclassical main wing from 1858.
Skamstrup Rectory		Grydebjergvej 9, 4440 Mørkøv		Small side wing from the 1960s.
Skamstrup Rectory		Grydebjergvej 9, 4440 Mørkøv		Small side wing from the 1960s.
Torbenfeldt		Ringstedvej 50, 4440 Mørkøv		Main building of which the south wing dates from the Middle Ages (but has been extended), the octagonal tower from the 17th century (adapted in 1767 and again c. 1900), the east wing from 1577 (adapted in 1767 and again c. 1900) and the north wing from 1767 (adapted in c. 1900)

=== 4520 Svinninge ===
Listing name	Image	Location	Coordinates	Description
Nordvestsjællands Elektricitetsværk		Hovedgaden 36, 4520 Svinninge		Two-storey former power plant from 1913 designed by Ivar Bentsen.
Nordvestsjællands Elektricitetsværk		Hovedgaden 36, 4520 Svinninge		Washhouse from 1913 designed by Ivar Bentsen.
Nordvestsjællands Elektricitetsværk		N V E 3, 4520 Svinninge		Residence for the managing director of the power plant.
Nordvestsjællands Elektricitetsværk		N V E 9, 4520 Svinninge		Building with housing for white-collar workers.
