= Andel (company) =

Danish energy company

- Industry: Energy
- Founded: 2005 (as SEAS-NVE); 2020 (as Andel)
- Headquarters: Svinninge, Denmark
- Key people: Jesper Hjulmand (CEO)
- Revenue: DKK 3.52 billion (2016)
- Number of employees: 2000 (2022)
- Website: www.andel.dk

Andel (until August 2020 known as SEAS-NVE) is a customer-owned energy company headquartered in Svinninge, Holbæk Municipality, Denmark. It covers the southern and western part of Zealand and Lolland-Falster. The company was founded in 2005 through the merger of SEAS and NVE.

== History ==
Sydsjællands Elektricitets Aktieselskab (SEAS) was founded in 1912. On 1 April 1951 the company merged with Falsters Højspændingsværk (founded 1912). Andelsselskabet Nordvestsjællands Elektricitetsværk (NVE) was founded in 1913. The two companies merged under the name SEAS-NVE in 2005.

In 2019, Andel bought the Copenhagen electricity distribution network from Ørsted for $3 billion.

In August 2020, the company's board endorsed a name change to Andel.

== Location ==
The company is headquartered in NVE' former buildings from 1913 on the main street of Svinninge. The complex was designed by Ivar Bentsen and consists of the former power plant as well as residential buildings for staff and a wash house. The complex was listed on the Danish registry of protected buildings and places on 5 December 1991. Helge Bojsen-Møller later served as architect for NVE.

The technical facilities are located in Haslev.
