= Tuse Kro =

Protected building in Denmark (e. 1754)

Tuse Inn
- Tuse Kro
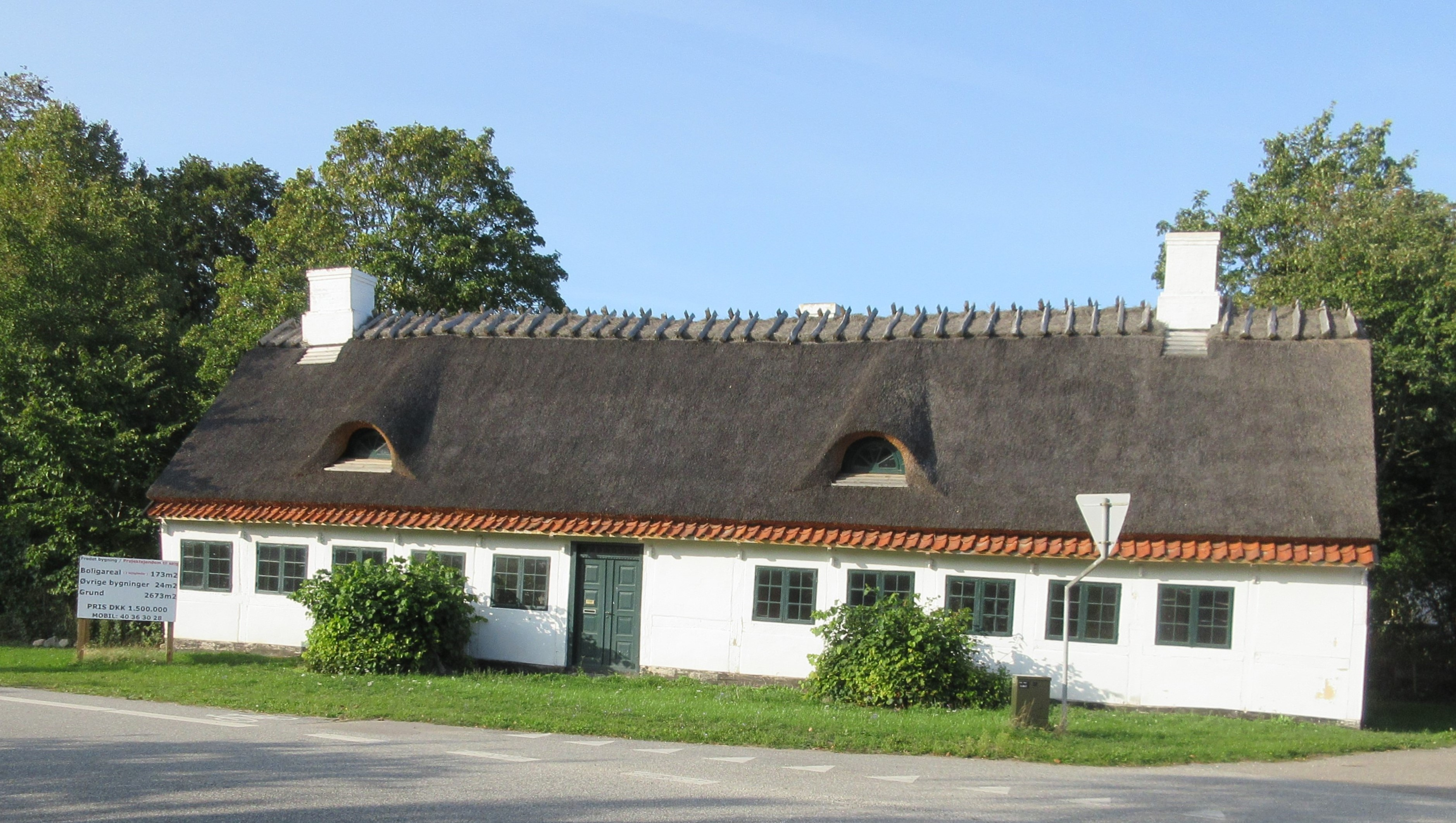
- Interactive map of the Tuse Inn area

General information
- Location: Tuse Byvej 100, 4300 Holbæk, Denmark
- Coordinates: 55°42′56.38″N 11°37′0.3″E
- Completed: 1754

Tuse Inn (Danish: Tuse Kro) is a former coaching inn situated opposite Tuse Church in the village of Tuse, Holbæk Municipality, Denmark. The building was listed in the Danish registry of protected buildings and places in 1950.

== History ==
Tuse Inn was built in 1754 and provided a resting point for travellers between Roskilde and Kalundborg. The distance to Kalundborg was a "day's journey" (7 hours in the winter time). It was both used by private travellers in their coaches, the public riding stagecoaches and the mail coach.

The inn lost its role as an essential resting point between Roskilde and Kalundborg when the North-West Railway was inaugurated in 1874 and it closed in 1906. It has since then been used as a private residence. The stables and other surrounding buildings have been demolished.

The surviving building was listed in the Danish registry of protected buildings and places in 1950. At the turn of the century, the building had fallen into a state of neglect. In 2002, it was acquired by Tut Ejendomme with the intention of demolishing it and selling the land off in lots for single-family detached homes. These plans were stopped when the Danish Heritage Agency refused to delist the property. Comprehensive restoration work on the exterior of the building was completed in 2018.

== Architecture ==
The building has a thatched roof and white-plastered walls with robust oak timber framing. It was originally parallel to the road but has since a regulation of the road in 1962 been placed at an angle and was in this connection also shortened by three bays. It is now 13 bays long and five bays wide.
