= Store Tåstrup Rectory =

- Store Tåstrup Præstegård
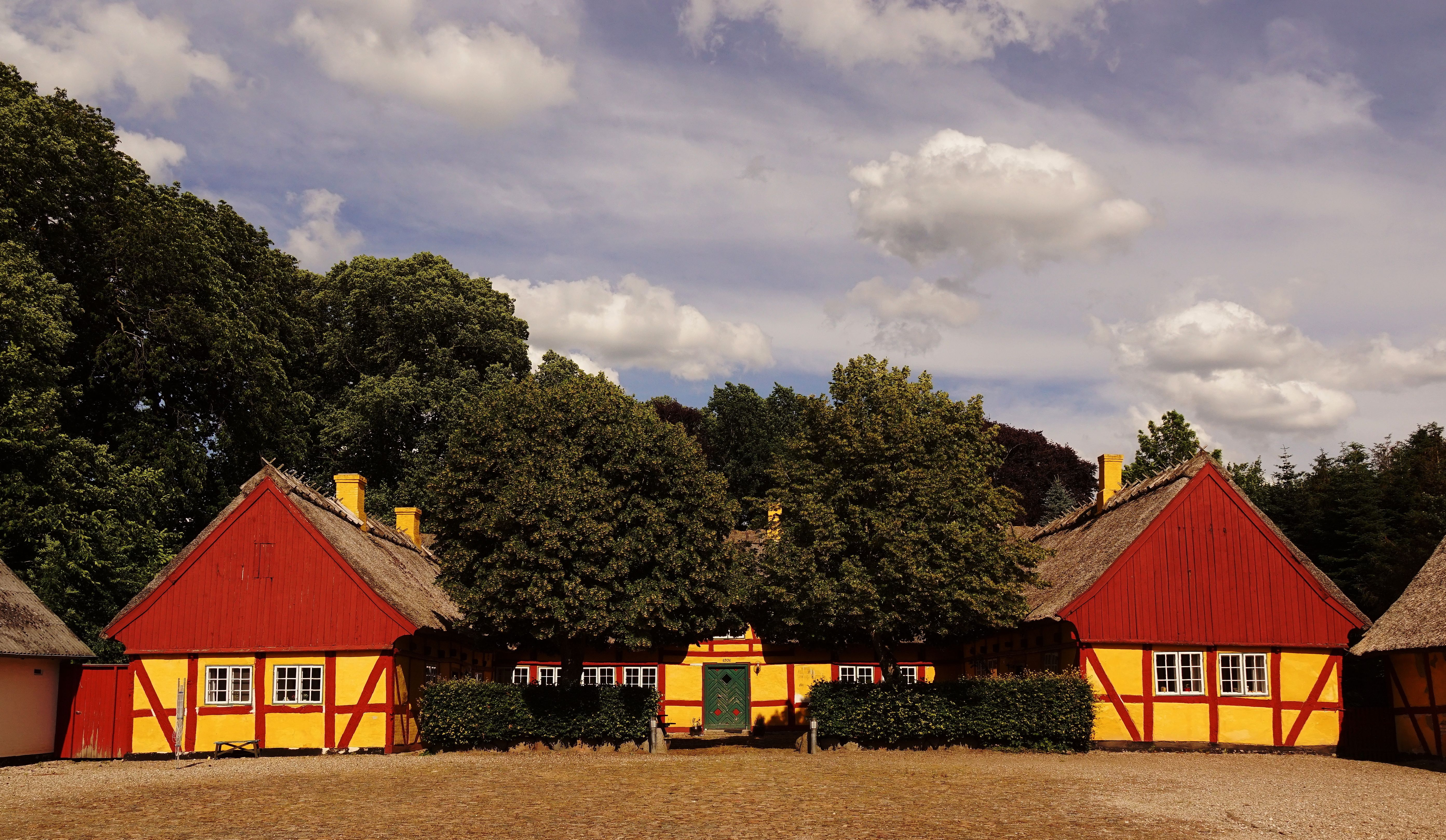
- Store Tåstrup Rectory in 2020
- Interactive map of the Store Tåstrup Rectory area

General information
- Location: Tåstrupvej 54, 4370 Store Merløse, Denmark
- Coordinates: 55°33′10.98″N 11°42′39.28″E
- Completed: 1701

Store Tåstrup Rectory (Danish: Store Tåstrup Præstegård) is a three-winged, half-timbered rectory located east of Store Tåstrup Church, just north of Store Merløse, Holbæk Municipality, some 50 km west of central Copenhagen, Denmark. Together with its three-winged home farm (avlsgård), which is located between the rectory and the church, it surrounds a large rectangular courtyard. Access to the courtyard and hence the main entrance of the rectory is through a gateway in the home farm. The rectory was listed in the Danish registry of protected buildings and places in 1950. The home farm is not listed but registered with "high preservation value".

== History ==
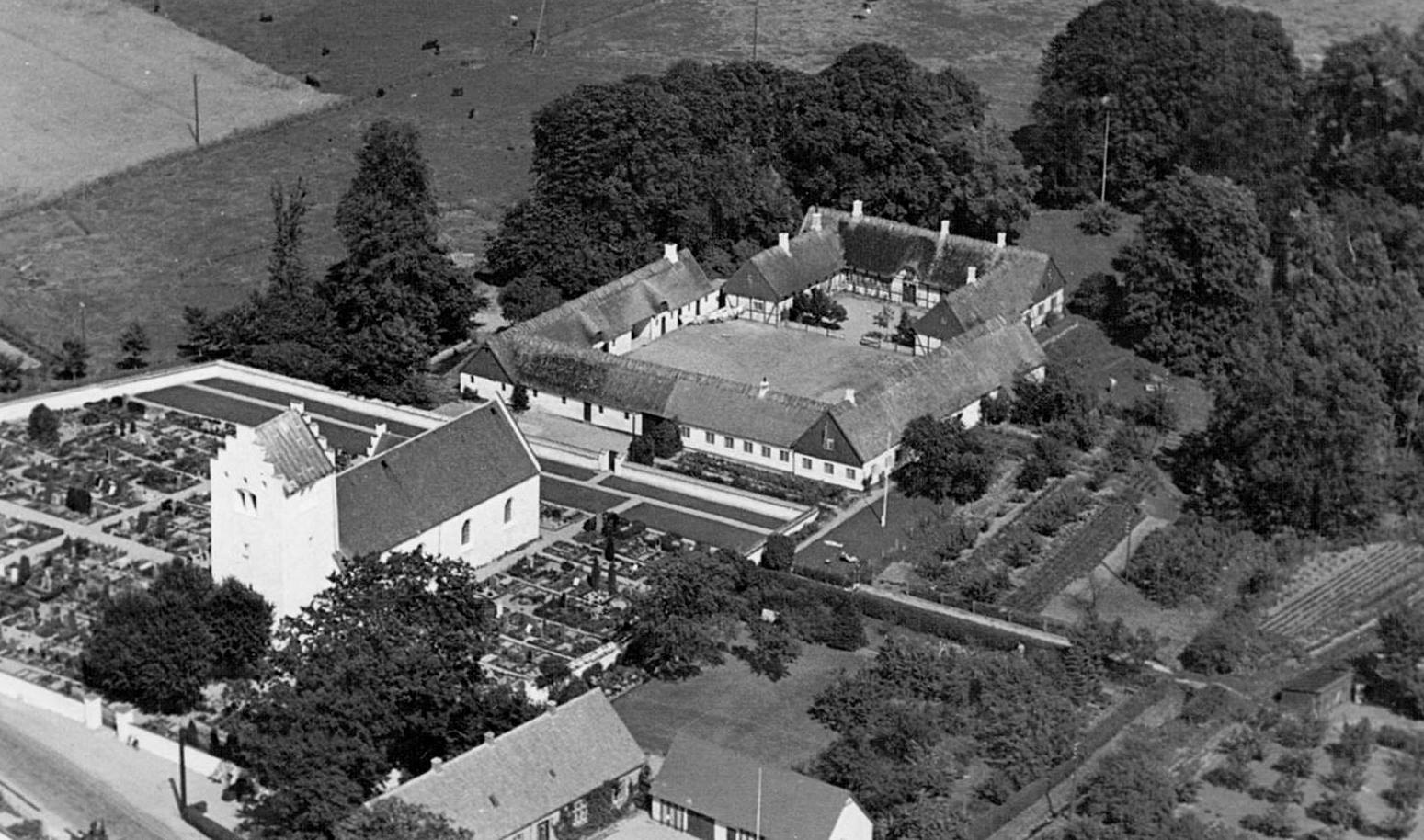
The rectory seen on an undated photograph

The right of patronage to the churches in Store Tåstrup and Ugerløse was in 1693 granted to Ulrik Frederik Gyldenløve. In 1797, Jacob Hansen Wulf was appointed as parish priest. On 8 February 1698, Wulf was married to Johanne Marie Brinch. Her father was the owner of the nearby Mølleborup estate. The new rectory was built in 1701 to a design similar to that of Mølleborup.

The two side wings are somewhat younger. The size of the home farm testifies to the economical and social position that the pastor enjoyed in the local community at the time of its construction.

The church and associated rectory was in 1808 acquired by count Frederik Knuth and placed under Merløsegaard. The church gained its independence in 1918.

The building was listed in the Danish registry of protected buildings and places in 1950. It was modernized in 1972. In 2019, Store Tåstrup Rectory was reported to be badly hit by mould.

== Architecture ==
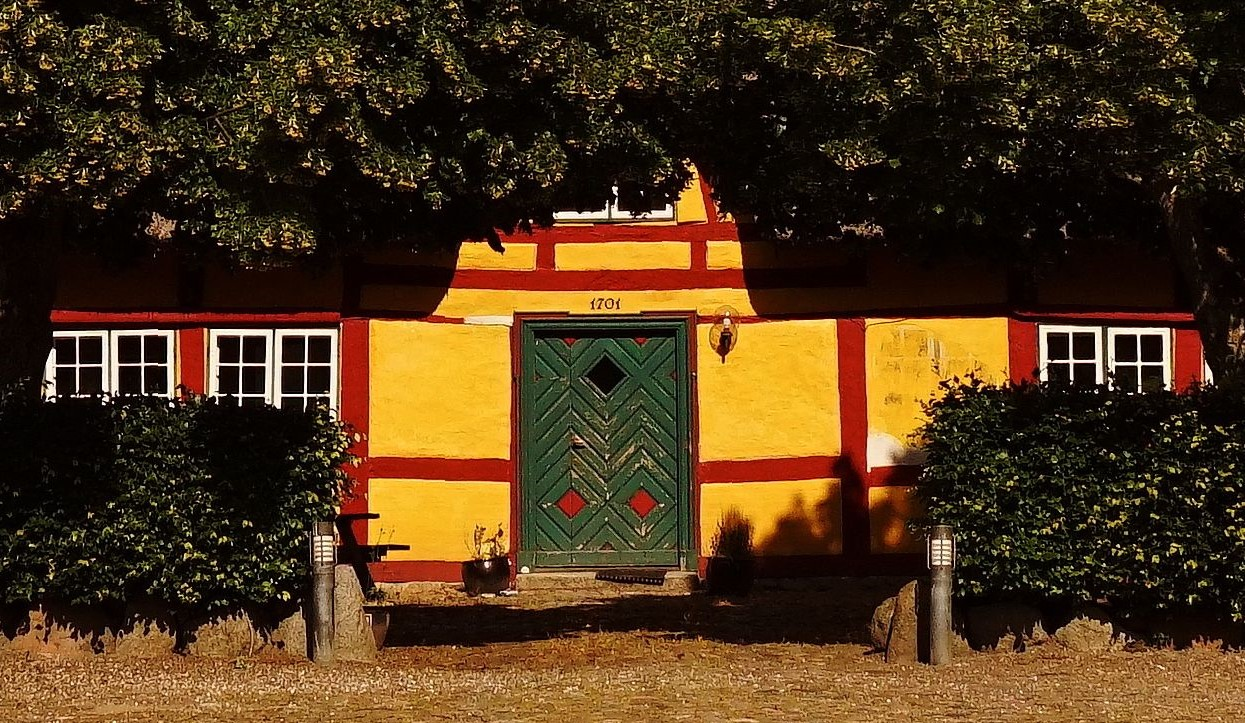
The main entrance with the year 1801 seen above the doorway

The three-winged rectory is yellow-washed with red painted timber framing and gables. The roof is thatched and the roof of the main wing has a thatched dormer above the main entrance. The door is painted green with red details and the year "1701" is written above it. On the other (east) side of the building towards the garden is a two-winged door. The doors in the two side wings have carved relief decorations on their lower parts.
