= Svinninge Municipality =

Former municipality in Denmark

Coordinates: 55°43′12″N 11°26′24″E

Until 1 January 2007 Svinninge municipality was a municipality (Danish, kommune) in the former West Zealand County on the island of Zealand (Sjælland) in eastern Denmark. The municipality covered an area of 86 km^{2}, and had a population of 6,588 (2005). Its last mayor was Søren Christensen, representing Venstre, Denmark's Liberal Party. The site of the municipal council was the town of Svinninge.

The municipality was formed in 1966, combining the parishes of Gislinge, Hjembæk, Svinninge, and Kundby. The first record of Svinninge and Gislinge dates from the 14th century, but some hold the opinion that the area has been settled since the Viking Age.

Svinninge municipality was, as the result of Kommunalreformen ("The Municipality Reform" of 2007), merged with existing Holbæk, Jernløse, Tornved, and Tølløse municipalities to form a new Holbæk municipality. This created a municipality with an area of 583 km^{2} and a total population of 66,611 (2005). The new municipality belongs to Region Sjælland ("Region Zealand").
