= Dorthealyst =

Coordinates: 55.6616°N 11.5701°E

Dorothealyst is a listed, Neoclassical house situated 10 km southwest of Holbæk in Holbæk Municipality, Denmark.

== History ==
Christian Ditlev Lunn, manager of Einsidelsborg on Funen, was in 1745 able to buy Knabstrup Manor at Holbæk. He had the previous year married 13 years younger Dorthea Cathrine Knudsen. He constructed Dorothealyst as a downer house for his wife. The house was built in 1799–1802 to design by Philip Lange, a son of the more famous architect Philip de Lange. The property never came to serve its intended purpose since Lunn in spite of the age difference outlived his wife. Lunn instead lived in the house himself after passing Knabstrup on to his their son Villars.

== Today ==
The estate is owned by the artist Marianne Seidenfaden and her family.

== See also ==
- Listed buildings in Holbæk Municipality
