= TA-Logistics =

Company

TA-Logistics A/S formerly FL-Group is a Danish family-owned transport and logistics company, active in the Northern part of Europe. The FL-Group's main segment is FMCG (fast-moving consumer goods).

== Activities ==
The main areas of business:

- FMCG, dry goods, refrigerated and frozen goods
- Warehousing
- Building Materials
- Recycled Materials
- Silo and bulk
- Transportation dangerous goods

The primary area is logistics in the Northern part of Europe and transport between Scandinavia and the rest of Europe.

The company headquarters is in Vitten, northwest of Aarhus, Denmark.

== Group companies ==
The FL-Group includes:

- Frode Laursen A / S - 100% owned
- IN-STORE A / S - 100% owned
- Nielsen & Sørensen - Frode Laursen Deutschland GmbH|Nielsen & Sørensen - Frode Laursen GmbH - 100% owned
- Skanol A / S - 50% owned
- Agri Norcold A / S - 57% owned

Frode Laursen A/S: represents the largest part of the activities of the FL-Group and includes FMCG logistics in Scandinavia and Northern Germany with its own warehouse. Frode Laursen A/S offers pickup from factories in Europe to either stores or warehouses in the Northern part of Europe through own warehouses and distribution centers. In addition, the company has activities within building materials in Scandinavia and Germany.

IN-STORE A/S: offers among other things product demonstrations, shelf replenishment, building campaign exhibitions and analysis of time spent in supermarkets.

Nielsen & Sørensen - Frode Laursen GmbH: The core business is silo and recycling movements in Scandinavia and Germany.

Skanol A/S: One of the largest transporters of dangerous goods by truck in Denmark and with operations in Sweden and Norway.

Agri Norcold A/S: Agri Norcold has the Northern Europe's largest FMCG cold store in Vejen and a total of 750,000 m3 cold stores in Denmark spread across 8 locations.

== Description of the individual segments ==
- FMCG - transportation, distribution and storage of FMCG in the Nordic countries. The segment covers large parts of the chain needs from inhauling, warehouse, co-pack, self-distribution to each store or wholesaler and distribution for wholesalers.
- Shop Activities - covers the last part of the chain in terms of activities in the stores to make sure that the goods end up in the customer's cart.
- Coldstore - freezing, frozen goods handling and storage of food in cold terminals in Denmark for the food industry.
- Building Materials – transportation to any construction site from the time the excavation work is finished to completion. Delivery of e.g. steel, concrete, insulation, profiles, cables, windows and ceilings directly to the construction site.
- Dangerous Goods - distribution and logistics within ADR goods transported in Northern Europe, including oil and petrol supplies to petrol stations, oil for private houses, industrial customers, truckers, contractors, agriculture, bunkering of ships, etc.
- Silo - transport of "food" and "non-food" in silo vehicles such as flour, coffee, grain, salt, fertilizer, cement, etc.
- Recycling - transport between waste depots and sorting centers with walking floor or tip-trucks. Typical industrial waste - such as packaging waste - feed, fertilizer, etc.

== Turnover ==
FL-Group's total turnover:

Year	Turnover in EUR
2008	188 million
2009	188 million
2010	309 million
2011	268 million
2012	295 million

== Locations ==
- Denmark: Hørning, Vitten, Jyderup, Tølløse, Vejle, Odense and Hedehusene
- Sweden: Aastorp near Helsingborg and Angered near Gothenburg
- Germany: Flensburg
- Finland: Kerava near Helsinki
- Poland: Szczecin
- Norway: Oslo

== History ==
1948: 'Road carrier Frode Laursen from Vitten near Hinnerup, Denmark founded his own transport company under the name "Vitten Heste & Kreaturtransport".

1970: 'Frode Laursen signs an agreement on transport and distribution of FMCG for Dansk Supermarked and Frisko, and the company is converted into a limited company.

1980: 'Road carrier Frode Laursen dies, and his son Niels Laursen becomes director of Frode Laursen A/S.

1988-89: 'Thorkil Andersen buys in 1988 half the shares of Frode Laursen A/S, he and Niels Laursen becomes directors of the company. The year after Thorkil Andersen buys the remaining shares of the company and becomes the sole shareholder. Niels Laursen retires from the company.

2000: 'The first warehouse is established in Jyderup and Frode Laursen A/S can now offer storage space for grocery suppliers. 70% of IN-STORE is acquired.

2001: '50% of Skanol is acquired. Storage in Vejle for trailers and building materials are established.

2005: 'New warehouses in Jyderup and Angered (Gothenburg) are built.

2006: 'Warehouse in Aastorp (Helsingborg) is established.

2007: 'Department and warehouse in Kerava (Helsinki) is established. FL Polska in Szczecin starts up.

2010: 'Acquisition of logistics company Nielsen and Soerensen GMBH in Flensburg, the warehouse Pack Scandinavia in Odense and the transport company Elementtransporten A/S.

2011: 'Established in Oslo, Norway

2012: '57% of the share of Agri Norcold A/S is acquired.
