= Søren Nielsen May =

Danish priest (died 1679)

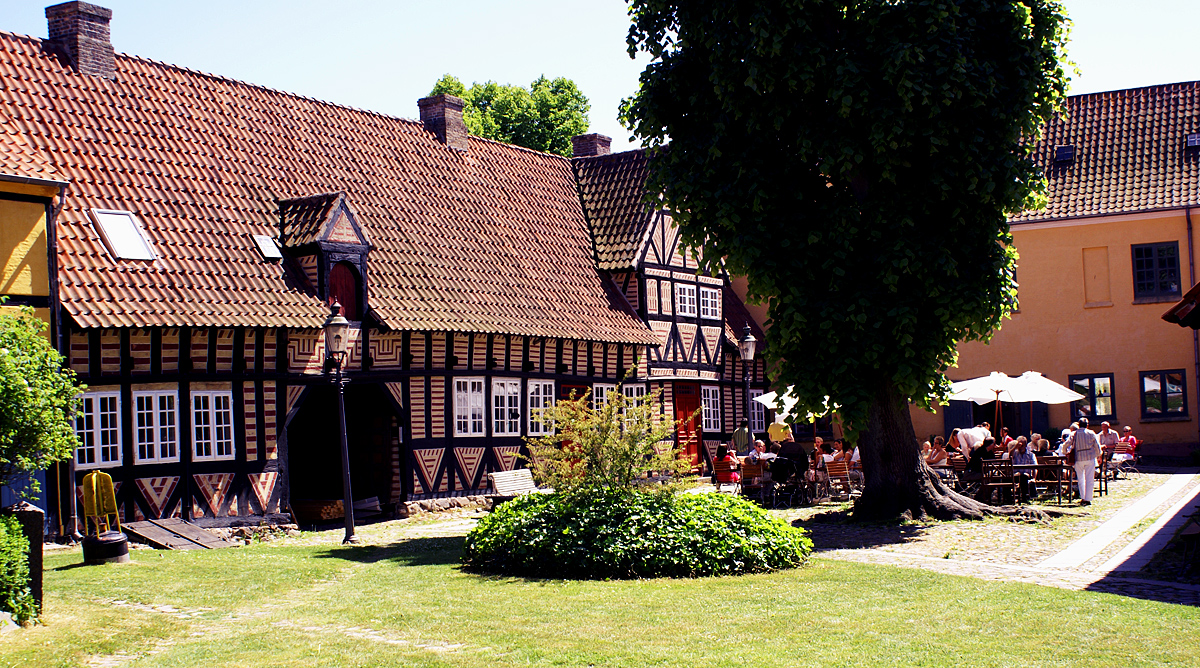
Søren Mays Gård in Klosterstræde 16, built 1669 for Søren May, and since 1919 seat of Holbæk Museum.

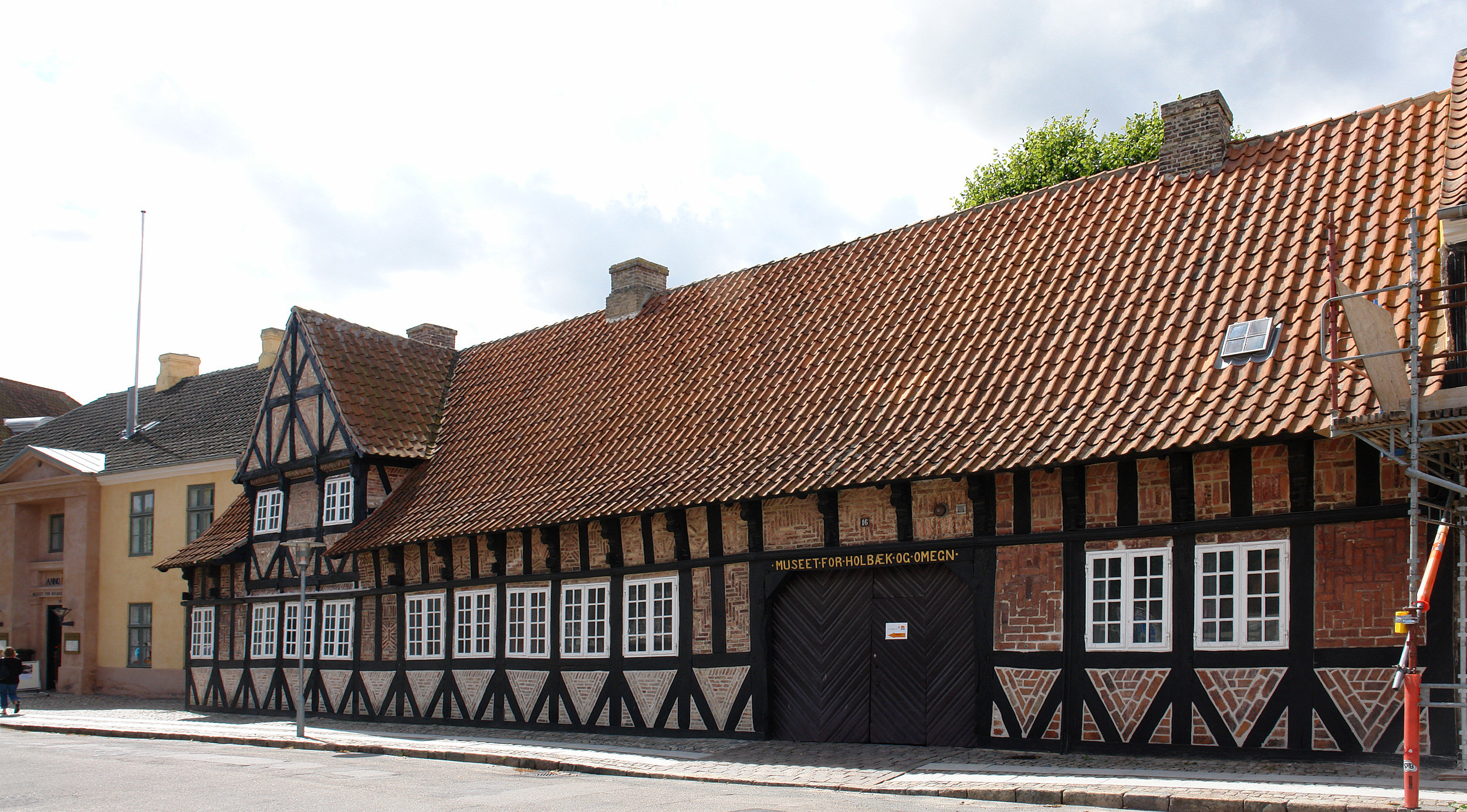
Søren Mays Gård

Søren Nielsen May (born in Helsingborg, died 16 September 1679 in Holbæk), also spelled Søren Nielsen Maj, was a Danish priest, who was parish priest and provost in Holbæk. He was an uncle of the statesman Peder Griffenfeld, Denmark-Norway's de facto ruler in the early 1670s.

He was married to Catharina Motzfeldt (born 1616 in Copenhagen, died 1676 in Holbæk), daughter of the noble wine merchant in Copenhagen Peter Motzfeldt (1584–1650) and Maria von Heimbach. Søren Nielsen May was the father-in-law of Bishop Ludvig Stoud, who served as his chaplain in Holbæk early in his career.
