= Nørre Jernløse Windmill =

Smock mill in Nørre Jernløse, Holbæk Municipality, Denmark

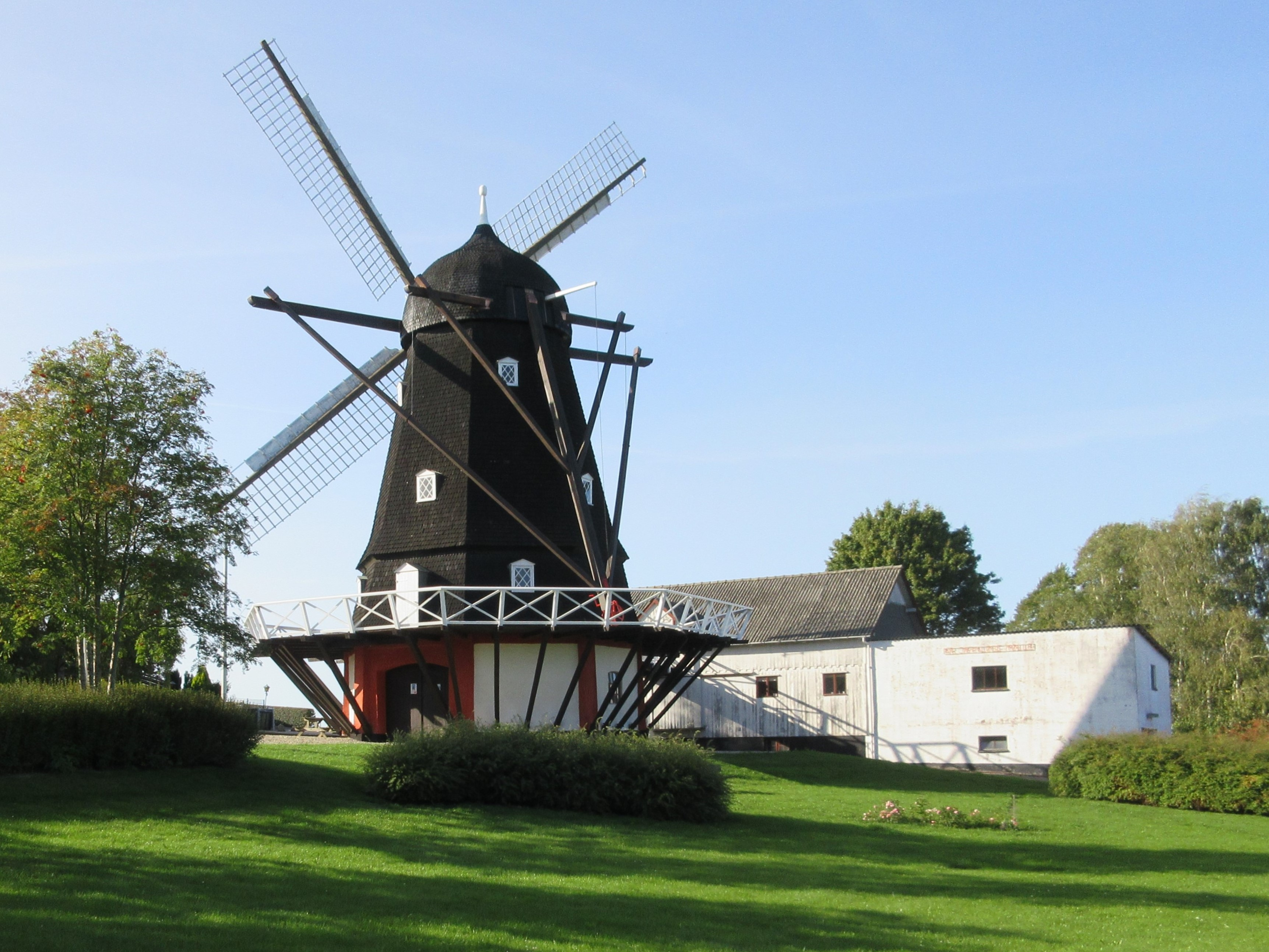
- Interactive map of Nørre Jernløse Windmill

Origin
- Mill name: Nørre Jernløse Windmill
- Mill location: Nørre Jernløse, Holbæk Municipality, Denmark
- Coordinates: 55.66342°N 11.62192°E
- Year built: 1853

Information
- Purpose: Corn mill, sawmill (1901-)
- Type: Smock mill
- Storeys: Three storey smock
- Base storeys: Single storey base
- Smock sides: Eight sides
- No. of sails: Four sails

Nørre Jernløse Windmill (Danish: Nørre Jernløse Mølle) is a smock mill in the village of Nørre Jernløse, Holbæk Municipality, some 50 km west of Copenhagen, Denmark. It was originally built on Copenhagen's North Rampart in 1853 but some 30 years later moved to its current location. It remained in use until 1953 and was restored to working condition in 1979–82. It was listed in the Danish registry of protected buildings and places in 1983 and has since 1993 been operated as a working museum by a local mill guild.

== History ==
=== St. Peter's Mill in Copenhagen ===
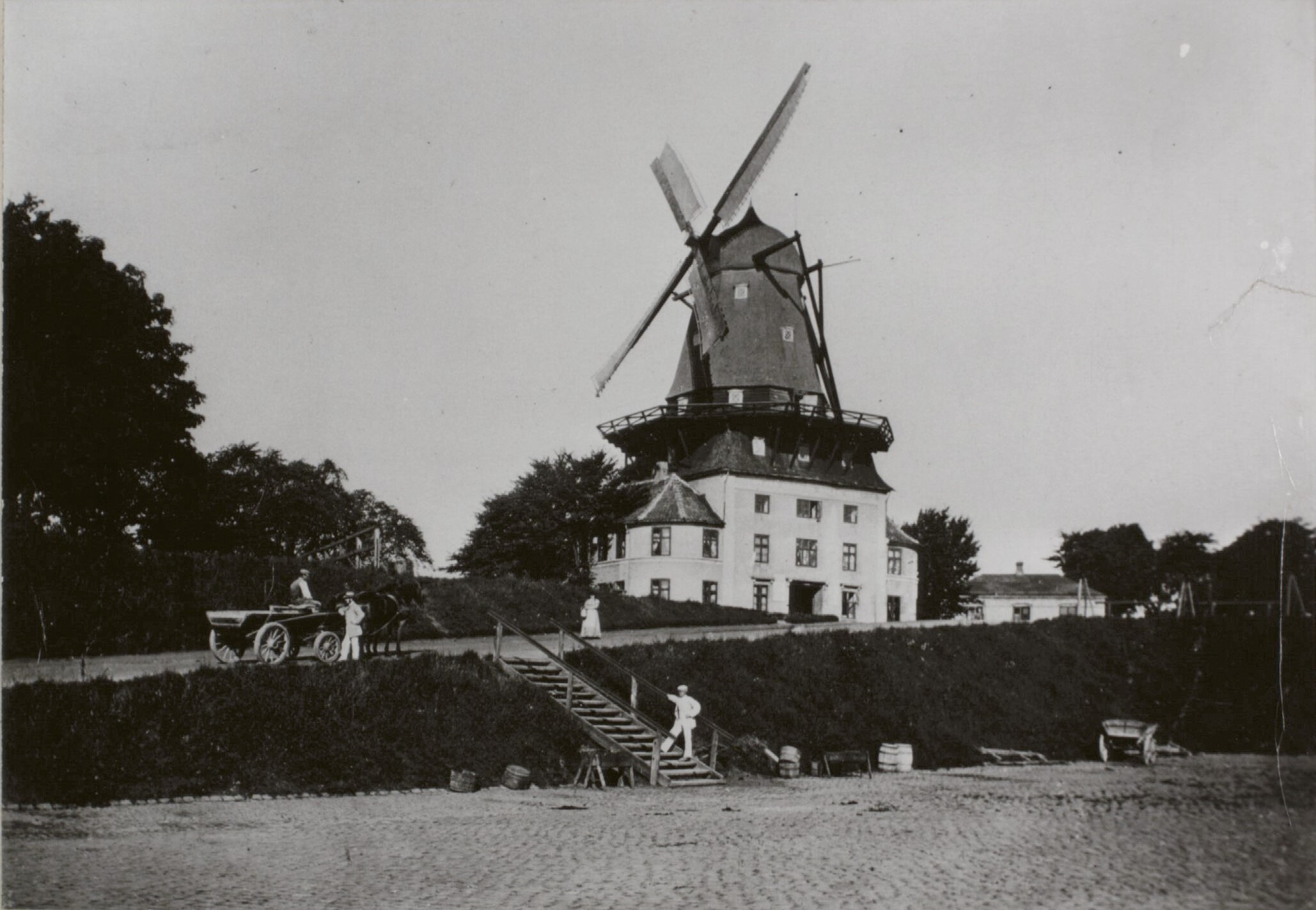
St, Peter's Mill

Copenhagen's bastioned fortification ring was for centuries dotted with windmills. Only two of these so-called "rampart mills"—Lille Mølle on Christianshavn Rampart and Kastelsmøllen in Kastellet—have survived in their original location. St. Peter's Mill was built in 1853 on Helmer's Bastion, part of Copenhagen's North Rampart, replacing a 17th-century post mill. Its name was taken after the adjacent street Sankt Peders Stræde. It was used as a grain mill.

=== Nørre Jernløse Windmill, 1885–1979 ===
In 1885, St. Peter's Mill was dismantled when the last part of the North Rampart was being removed. The dismantled windmill was purchased by farmer Niels Peter Rasmussen and subsequently transported to Nørre Jernløse by horse carriage where it was rebuilt on his property.

In 1899, Nørre Jernløse Windmill was acquired by farmer Ole Martin Nielsen and would remain in his family for almost 60 years. In 1901, he supplemented the flour mill with a saw mill. In 1902, a steam engine was installed as a supplement to the windmill. It was in 1915 replaced by a crude oil-powered engine.

In 1920, a large warehouse was built next to the mill. The windmill was modernized in 1922. It lost its sails in a storm in 1954 and they were after that not restored since wind energy had long only played an insignificant role in the operations.

=== Restoration and later use, 1979–present ===
The complex was in 1979 acquired by Holbæk Municipality but the industrial activities continued until 1981. In 1988, it was subject to a comprehensive restoration. In 1993, it was ceded to a mill guild and.

== Description ==
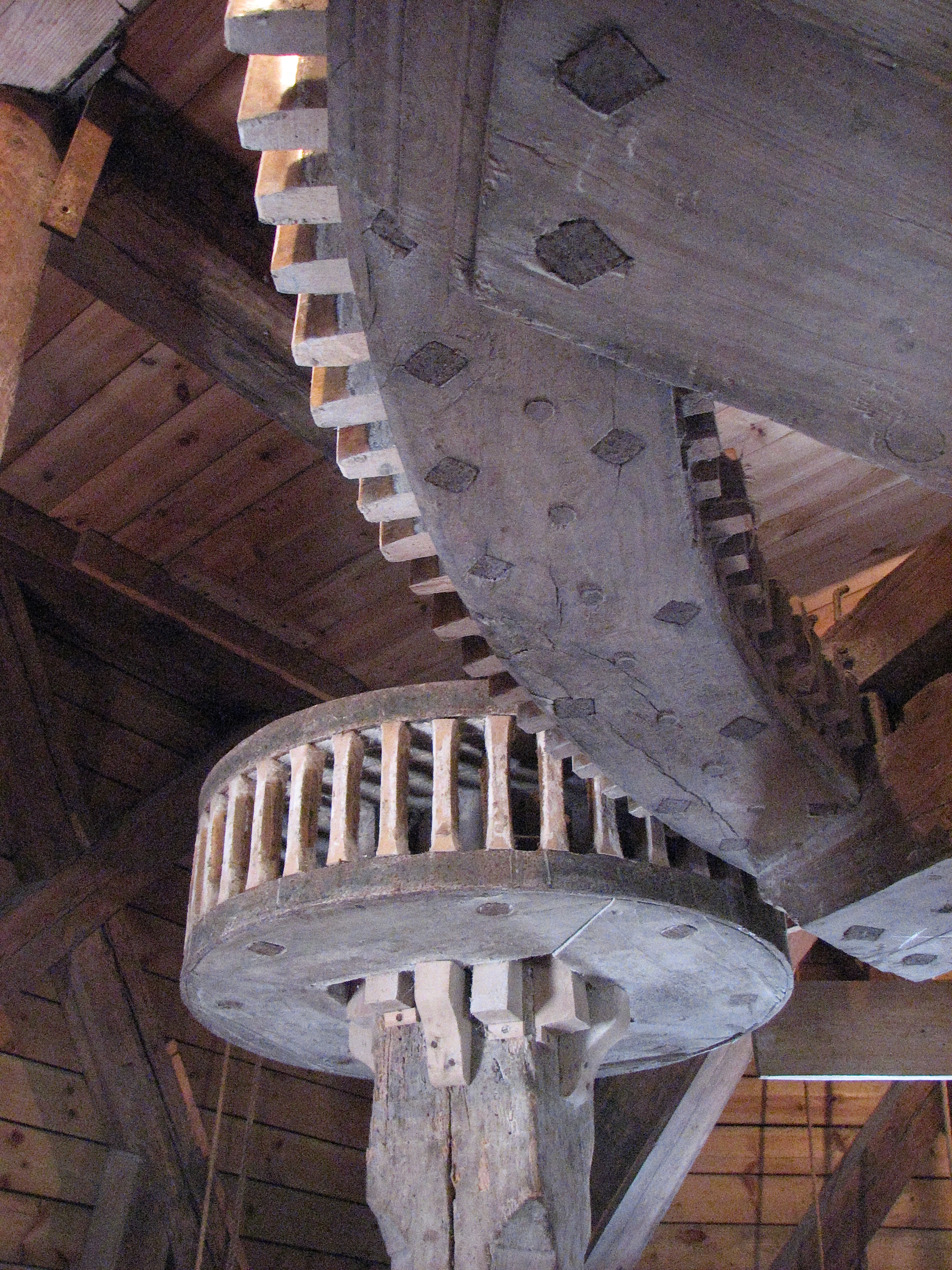
Main shaft of Nørre Jernløse Windmill

The windmill consists of a three-storey, octagonal tower standing with gallery on a white plastered brick case and topped by an ogee cap. The tower and cap are constructed in timber and clad with shingles. The cap carries the four sails. The mill has a manual yaw.

== Today ==
The windmill is now operated as a working museum by Nørre Jernløse Mill Guild. It is open visitors from 14:00 to 16:00 on the first Sunday of every month from April through October.
