= Tornved Municipality =

Former Danish municipality

Coordinates: 55.6511°N 11.4375°E

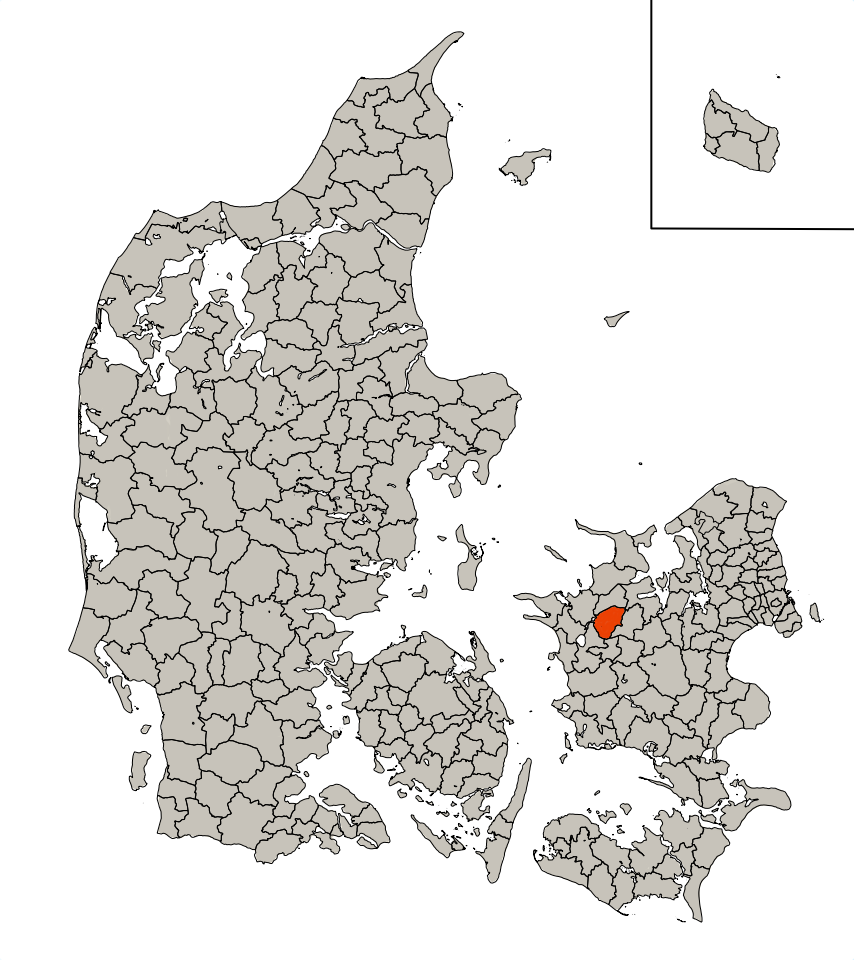
Tornved Municipality's location in Denmark.

Until 1 January 2007 Tornved municipality was a municipality (Danish, kommune) in the former West Zealand County on the island of Zealand (Sjælland) in Denmark. The municipality covered an area of 105 km^{2}, and had a total population of 9,135 (2005). Its last mayor was Jens Stenbæk, a member of the Venstre (Liberal Party) political party. The main town and the site of its municipal council was the town of Jyderup.

Tornved municipality ceased to exist as the result of Kommunalreformen ("The Municipality Reform" of 2007). It was merged with Holbæk, Jernløse, Svinninge, and Tølløse municipalities to form a new Holbæk municipality. This created a municipality with an area of 583 km^{2} and a total population of 66,611 (2005). The new municipality belongs to Region Sjælland ("Region Zealand").
