= Tølløse Municipality =

Former municipality of Denmark

Coordinates: 55.6°N 11.7667°E

Until 1 January 2007, Tølløse municipality was a municipality (Danish, kommune) in the northeastern part of the former West Zealand County on the island of Zealand (Sjælland) in Denmark. The municipality covered an area of 126 km², and had a total population of 9,832 (2005). Its last mayor was Poul Erik Jensen, a member of the Danish Social Liberal Party (Det Radikale Venstre) political party.

The main town and the site of its former municipal council was the town of Tølløse.

Tølløse municipality ceased to exist as the result of Kommunalreformen ("The Municipality Reform" of 2007). It was merged with Holbæk, Jernløse, Svinninge, and Tornved municipalities to form a new Holbæk municipality. This created a municipality with an area of 583 km² and a total population of 66,611 (2005). The new municipality belongs to Region Sjælland ("Region Zealand").
