= Jernløse Municipality =

Former municipality in Denmark

Coordinates: 55.6494°N 11.6514°E

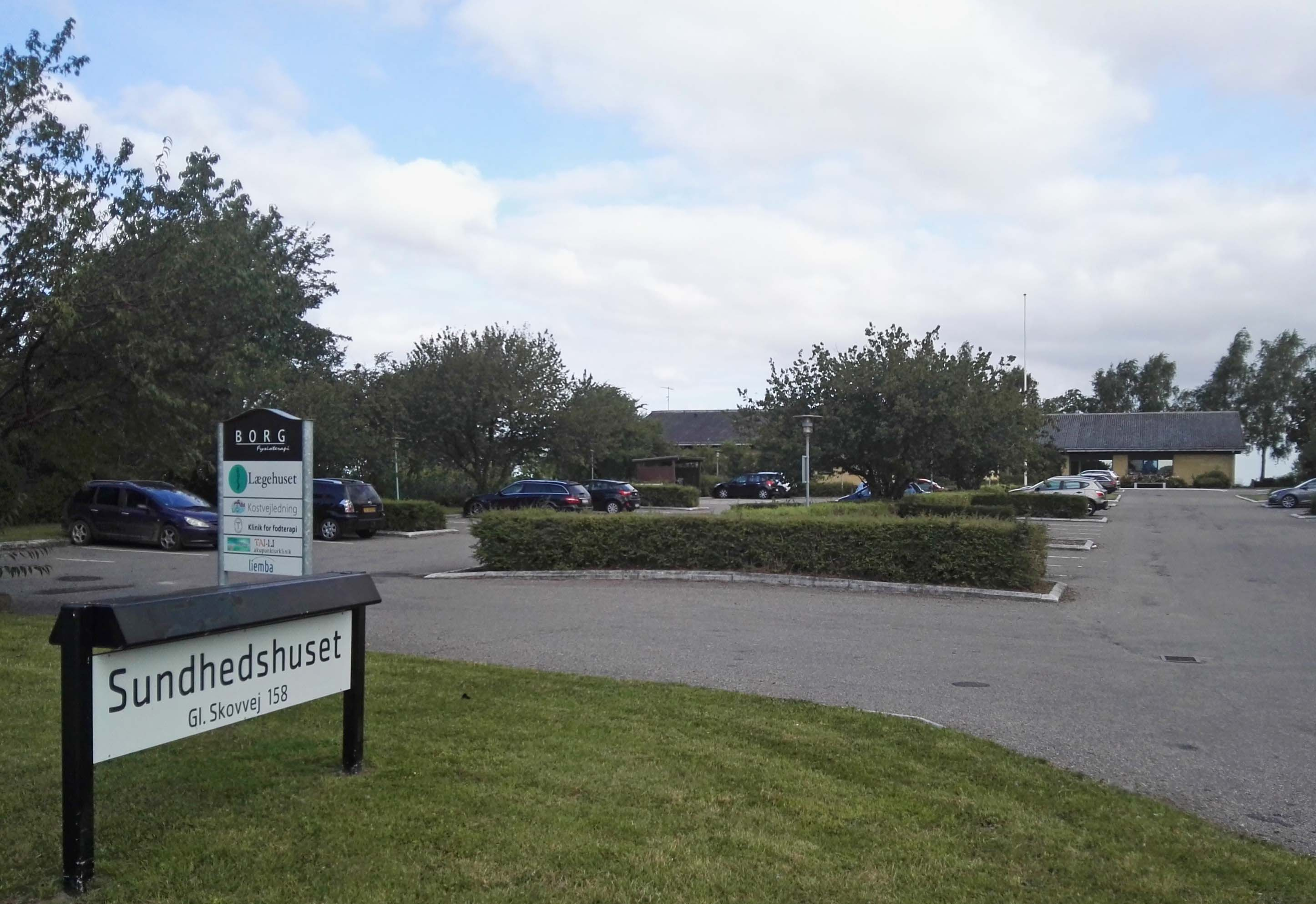
Jernløse municipality's town hall at Gammel Skovvej 158 in Nørre Jernløse, now a health center in Holbæk municipality.

Until 1 January 2007 Jernløse municipality was a municipality (Danish, kommune) in northeastern West Zealand County on the island of Zealand (Sjælland) in Denmark. The municipality covered an area of 103 km^{2}, and had a population of 5,943 (2005). Its last mayor was Annica Granstrøm representing Venstre, Denmark's Liberal Party. The site of the municipal council was the town of Nørre Jernløse. Regstrup is the biggest town in the municipal.

Jernløse municipality ceased to exist as the result of Kommunalreformen ("The Municipality Reform" of 2007). It was merged with existing Holbæk, Svinninge, Tornved, and Tølløse municipalities to form a new Holbæk municipality. This created a municipality with an area of 583 km^{2} and a total population of 66,611 (2005). The new municipality belongs to Region Sjælland ("Region Zealand").
