= Orø =

Island in Denmark

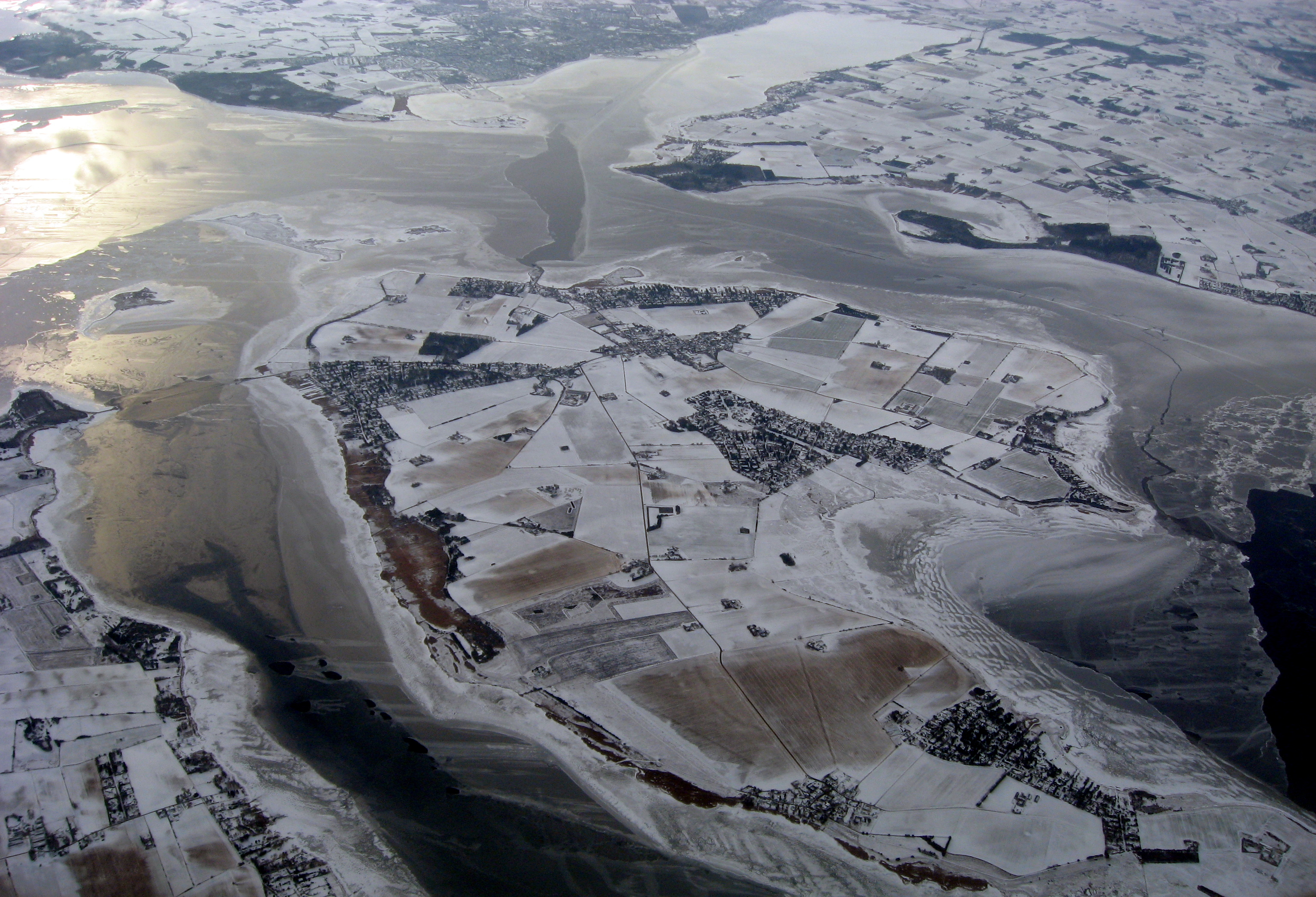
- Aerial image of Orø, January 2010
- Interactive map of Orø

Geography
- Coordinates: 55°46′N 11°49′E
- Adjacent to: Isefjord
- Area: 14 km^{2} (5.4 sq mi)

Administration
- Denmark
- Region: Region Zealand
- Municipality: Holbæk Municipality

Demographics
- Population: 1006

Additional information
- Danish postal code: 4305

Orø is a small island in Denmark located in the Isefjord within Holbæk Municipality. The island covers 14 km^{2} (3,500 acres) and has a population of 1006 (as of 1 January 2026). There are four villages on Orø: Bybjerg, the largest village on the island with a population of 286 (1 January 2026), Brønde, Gamløse and Næsby.

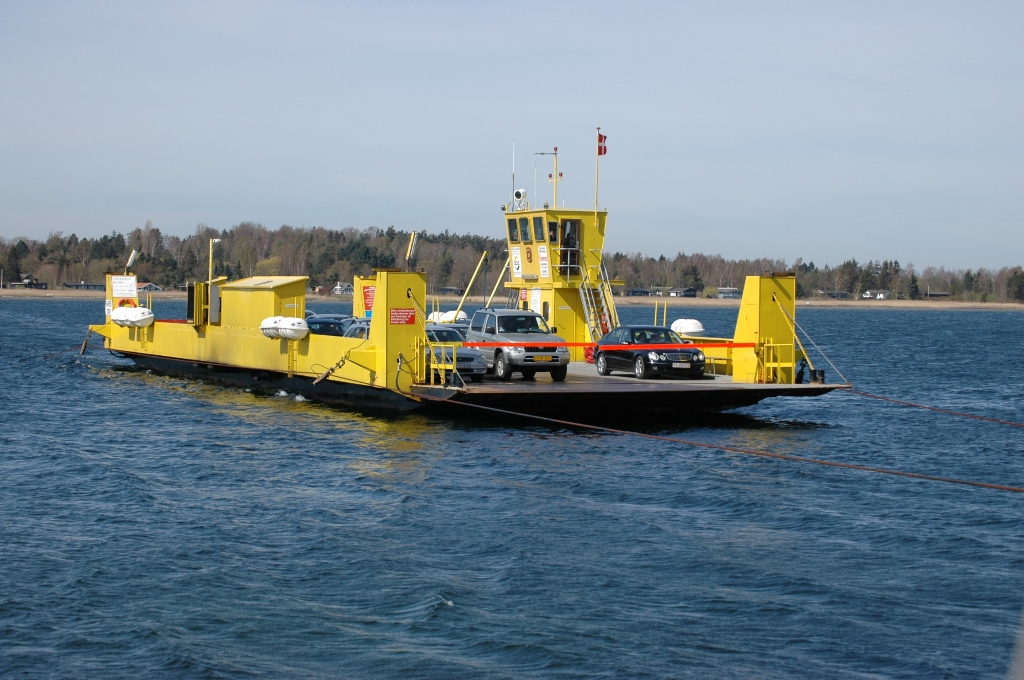
Cable ferry Karen Orø

There is a ferry connection between Orø and Holbæk, and a cable ferry connects the island to Hammer Bakke (Hammer Hill) on the Hornsherred peninsula. It is a popular vacation area with some 1,200 summer houses. Orø Church dating back to the 12th century and Orø Museum, which depicts local life in the area, are both national monuments.

== Etymology ==
During the Viking Age, the island is believed to have been referred to as Warthærø, meaning "little island with the guard post", suggesting it served as a strategic location to monitor boats passing through the Isefjord. Until the mid-20th century, the name of the island was written as Ourø, despite its common pronunciation as Orø. Today, the name of the island is written phonetically.

== History ==
The island of Orø was formed following the Last Glacial Period, approximately 10,000 years ago, from glacial deposits. Stone, gravel, and sand which had been contained within the ice of glaciers, were carried to region and remained there once the ice melted. The deposit caused the creation of a hill which, with rising water levels from the glacial melt, turned the deposited hill into the island of Orø.

A number of archaeological finds, including flint tools, demonstrate that the island was inhabited in prehistoric times. A number of burial mounds from the stone age have been identified, three of which are currently preserved. One of the most important archaeological finds made on Orø is the Margrethekors (English: Margaret Cross), a large relic cross constructed in Scandinavia c. 1100. The cross was uncovered in 1849 by Bodil Margrethe Hansdatter, after whom the cross received its name. The style of the cross reflects a Byzantine influence. The center of the cross has a small cavity which is believed to have once contained a splinter from the cross of Jesus, but is now empty.

The villages of Bybjerg and Gamløse were likely established during the Iron Age, while Næsby was founded later in the Viking Age. The village of Brønde is the most recently established settlement on Orø. It initially consisted of a collection of fishermen's houses which had been built in the late 19th century and expanded into a larger settlement in the early 20th century.

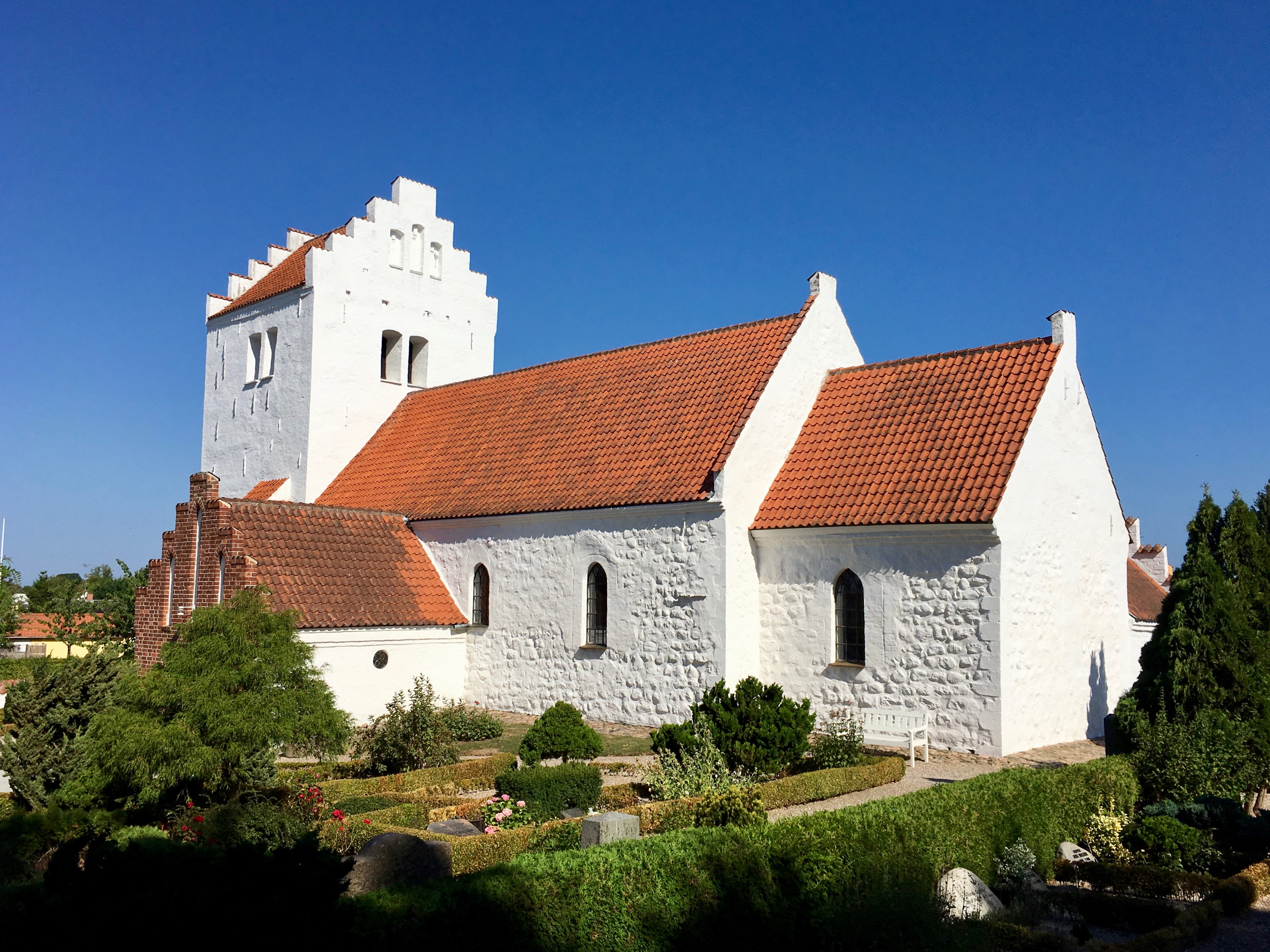
Orø Kirke in Bybjerg

Orø Church (Danish: Orø Kirke) is located on the eastern edge of the village of Bybjerg. The church dates to the late 12th century. Its choir and nave were built in the 1100s, while the tower, church porch, and sacristy are 15th and 16th century additions. It was heavily renovated in the late 19th century, and the original Romanesque architectural style was altered. The church's original Romanesque frescos had also been whitewashed, and were not rediscovered until 2001.

In 1375, Queen Margaret I mortgaged the island, along with Holbæk and Merløse Hundreds to two brothers, Nicolaus and Ericus Skeples. That same year, the Skeples brothers transferred the mortgage to Henning Podebusk for 400 marks. The value of the island is believed to have come from its hunting opportunities and the existence of a small hunting lodge or castle on Stensbjerg hill.

=== Modern history ===
In 1951, a 10 kilovolt submarine communications cable was laid, connection the Orø to Zealand via Hornsherred.

Orø was, until the 1970 Danish Municipal Reform, a parish within Holbæk County (Danish: Holbæk Amt). Since the Municipal reform of 2007, it has been part of Holbæk Municipality.
