= Holbæk Priory =

Dominican monastery in Holbæk, Denmark

Coordinates: 55.7162°N 11.7132°E

Holbaek Priory was a small Dominican monastery in Holbæk, Denmark.

== History ==
Holbæk is first mentioned in 1199 in a letter of gift from Bishop Absalon. The Dominican Priory at Holbaek was established by 1275 just south of Holbæk, Denmark. The king personally owned Holbæk and the town had supported the king's cause against the Bishop of Roskilde and perhaps the placing of a Dominican house at Holbaek and the building of Holbæk Castle added to its stature among Zealand towns. The priory was burned in a town fire in 1287 and had to be rebuilt. The Black Friars Church was dedicated to St Nicholas in 1323 by Bishop Niels of Børglum. It became the north range of a roughly rectangular friary. The church was open to the public for mass with the friars separated from the townspeople by a gate. Women were not permitted in St Nicholas except on days when special commemorative masses were said. The south range, which still exists was built in the mid-15th century in the Gothic style out of red bricks. The two-story refectory with a vaulted cellar. The range built in the same style was older and housed the individual friars' cells, chapter hall and perhaps a library. The west range was constructed in the first quarter of the 16th century to complete the quadrangle. The priory had a garden and at least a partial cloister for the friars to walk outside under shelter. There was a cemetery attached to the priory. The priory church had a nave and single side aisle with a choir with an apse on the east end.

Holbæk Priory enjoyed royal favor especially Christopher II. Queen Dorothea of Brandenburg, the wife of Christopher II and Christian I, whose generosity permitted a major expansion of the priory complex. Since the Dominicans were a mendicant order they were reliant on the gifts of individuals or families to support the priory and its works, usually schools and hospitals. The gifts were most often in the form of properties such as farms or houses in towns which were used to generate rents. Royal favors included properties and unique forms of revenue such as landing rights, fishing rights, or fees to be paid for religious services such as masses for the dead. The priory church became a popular place for burials of local nobles and officials who were often remembered with large tombstones which were set into the floor of the church. Several of these have been preserved to modern times. Holbæk Priory was never a large monastery. The gifts it received of which records exist are in small amounts, usually a few pennies or guilders.

=== Reformation ===
The continuous existence of the friary was threatened in the early 16th century as Danes exchanged their Catholic beliefs and institutions for those of the Lutheran reformers. Mendicant orders were particularly disliked for the constant appeals for alms in addition to the usual tithes and fees Danes paid to the church until the Reformation. The Franciscans were hounded form 28 Danish towns by 1532 some virtually at sword point. The Dominicans received a letter of protection from Count Christopher of Oldenburg in the Count's Feud, a civil war which ended Catholic influence in Denmark. Unfortunately, they picked the wrong side. Count Christopher went to war on behalf of Christian II, the last Catholic king of Denmark, and he lost. Christian III, who was a staunch Lutheran, and the State Council (Danish: Rigsråd) made Denmark a Lutheran country in October 1536 with the adoption of the Lutheran Ordinances, which stipulated religious belief and practices throughout Denmark.

The friars were already having difficulty supporting the priory and by February 1535 the buildings had been abandoned. The last Dominican prior at Holbæk, Hans Pedersen, wrote a letter of gift to the town as a place for the sick and poor. He attributed the loss of the priory to the sore hunger, want, and poverty which the brothers endured had endured but could no longer. The town of Holbæk took control of the priory with the intent of making it into a hospital for the poor and sick. The church was made into a reformed parish church for the town. But all religious houses and their properties reverted to the crown and Christian III ordered the demolition of the priory in order to expand Holbæk Castle. The eastern range and part of the southern range were pulled down, and then work was halted. The remnants of the priory were turned over to the town and the buildings were converted into a school which existed in one form or another there until 1902. The other range became a town hall. Part of the town hall was turned into the town jail called the "tower prison". The town hall occupied the building until 1844 when it became a mortuary. In 1869 the ancient priory church was torn down and a new expanded one was built on the site. In the 1970s the remaining sections of the priory were restored and turned over to St Nicholas' church for a meeting halls and offices.

== Sources ==
- Jacobsen, J.G.G. 'The Priory of the Black Friars in Holbaek'. 2003 http://jggj.dk/Holbaek_Kloster_UK.htm
