= Gislinge =

- Railway town
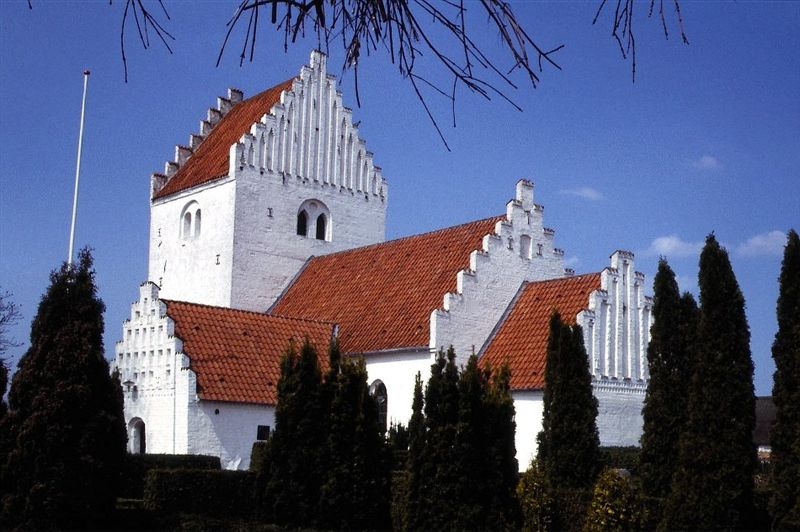
- Gislinge Church

- Location in Region Zealand Gislinge (Denmark)
- Coordinates: 55°44′0″N 11°32′30″E
- Country: Denmark
- Region: Region Zealand
- Municipality: Holbæk Municipality

Area
  - Urban: 1.0 km^{2} (0.39 sq mi)

Population (2026)
  - Urban: 1,576
  - Urban density: 1,600/km^{2} (4,100/sq mi)
- Time zone: UTC+1 (CET)
  - Summer (DST): UTC+2 (CEST)
- Postal_code: DK-4532 Gislinge

Gislinge is a small railway town in Holbæk Municipality on the island of Zealand, Denmark. It is located 12 kilometres (7.5 mi) west of the town of Holbæk. As of 1 January 2026, Gislinge has a population of 1,576. Gislinge is located on the Odsherred railway line and is served by Gislinge railway station. The manor house Gislingegård is located just south of the town.
