= Svinninge, Holbæk =

Svinninge
- town
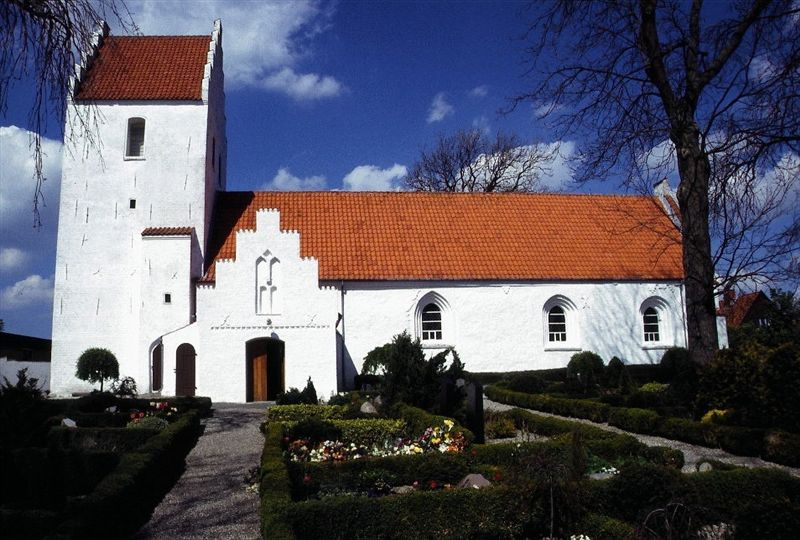
- Svinninge Church

- Location in Denmark Svinninge (Denmark Region Zealand)
- Coordinates: 55.72189°N 11.45977°E
- Country: Denmark
- Region: Zealand (Sjælland)
- Municipality: Holbæk

Area
  - Urban: 1.7 km^{2} (0.66 sq mi)

Population (2026)
  - Urban: 2,891
  - Urban density: 1,700/km^{2} (4,400/sq mi)
- Time zone: UTC+1 (CET)
  - Summer (DST): UTC+2 (CEST)
- Postal code: DK-4520 Svinninge

Svinninge is a railroad town in Holbæk Municipality, Region Zealand in Denmark with a population of 2,891 (1 January 2026).

The town is located at Odsherredsbanen, the railroad between Holbæk and Nykøbing Sjælland operated by Lokaltog A/S.

Until 1 January 2007, Svinninge was the municipal seat of the former Svinninge Municipality.

== Landmarks ==
SEAS-NVE is headquartered in Svinninge.

== Notable people ==
- Anna Thea Madsen (born 1994), Danish badminton player; lives in Svinninge
