= Mørkøv =

- Railway town
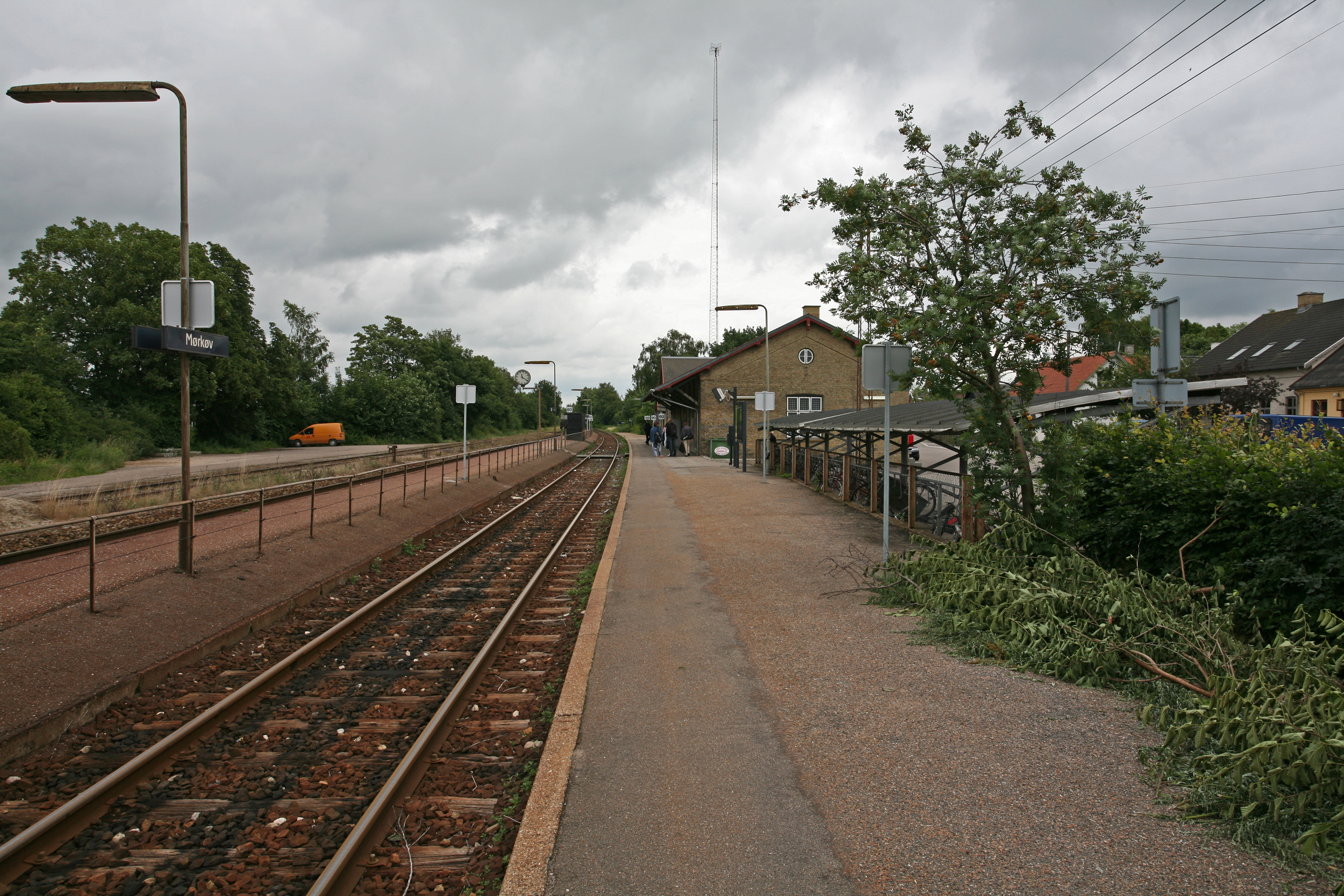
- Mørkøv railway station

- Location in Region Zealand Mørkøv (Denmark)
- Coordinates: 55°39′05″N 11°30′05″E
- Country: Denmark
- Region: Region Zealand
- Municipality: Holbæk Municipality

Area
  - Urban: 1.3 km^{2} (0.50 sq mi)

Population (2026)
  - Urban: 1,899
  - Urban density: 1,500/km^{2} (3,800/sq mi)
- Time zone: UTC+1 (CET)
  - Summer (DST): UTC+2 (CEST)
- Postal code: DK-4440 Mørkøv

Mørkøv is a railway town located in the northwestern part of the island of Zealand, Denmark. As of 1 January 2026, it has a population of 1,899. The town is located in Holbæk Municipality in Region Zealand.

Mørkøv is located on the Danish national road 23 and is served by Mørkøv railway station on the Northwest Line between Kalundborg and Holbæk.
