= Jyderup =

- town
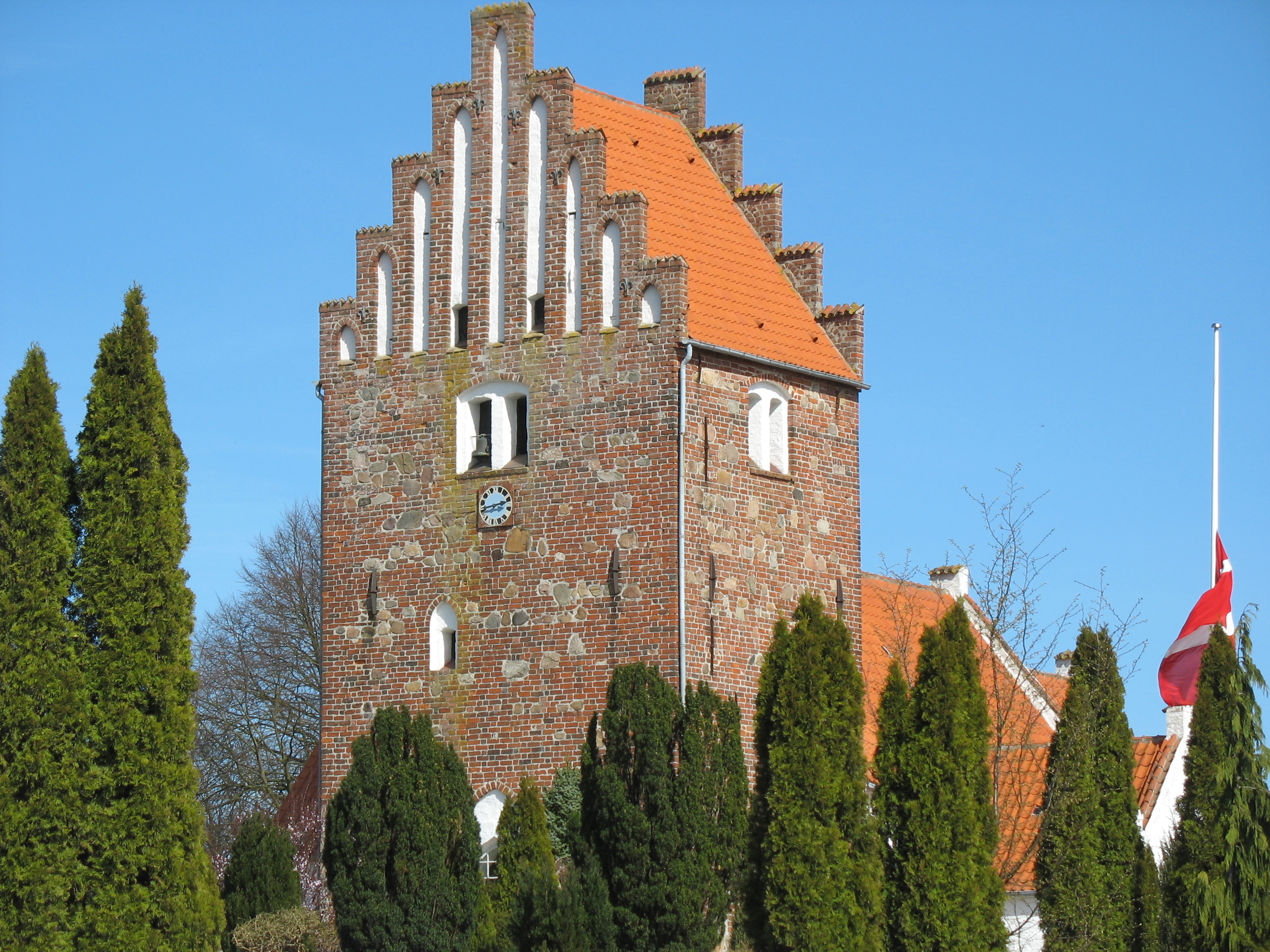
- Jyderup church

- Location in Denmark Jyderup (Denmark Region Zealand)
- Coordinates: 55.66004°N 11.39862°E
- Country: Denmark
- Region: Zealand (Sjælland)
- Municipality: Holbæk

Area
  - Urban: 2.91 km^{2} (1.12 sq mi)

Population (2026)
  - Urban: 4,207
  - Urban density: 1,450/km^{2} (3,740/sq mi)
  - Gender: 2,014 males and 2,193 females
- Time zone: UTC+1 (CET)
  - Summer (DST): UTC+2 (CEST)
- Postal code: DK-4450 Jyderup

Jyderup is an old town, with a population of 4,207 (1 January 2026), in Holbæk Municipality, northwestern Zealand in Denmark. It is situated roughly halfway between the larger cities of Kalundborg and Holbæk on the west and east, respectively, and is surrounded by forest and farmland. The town is bordered on the west by the lake of Skarresø.

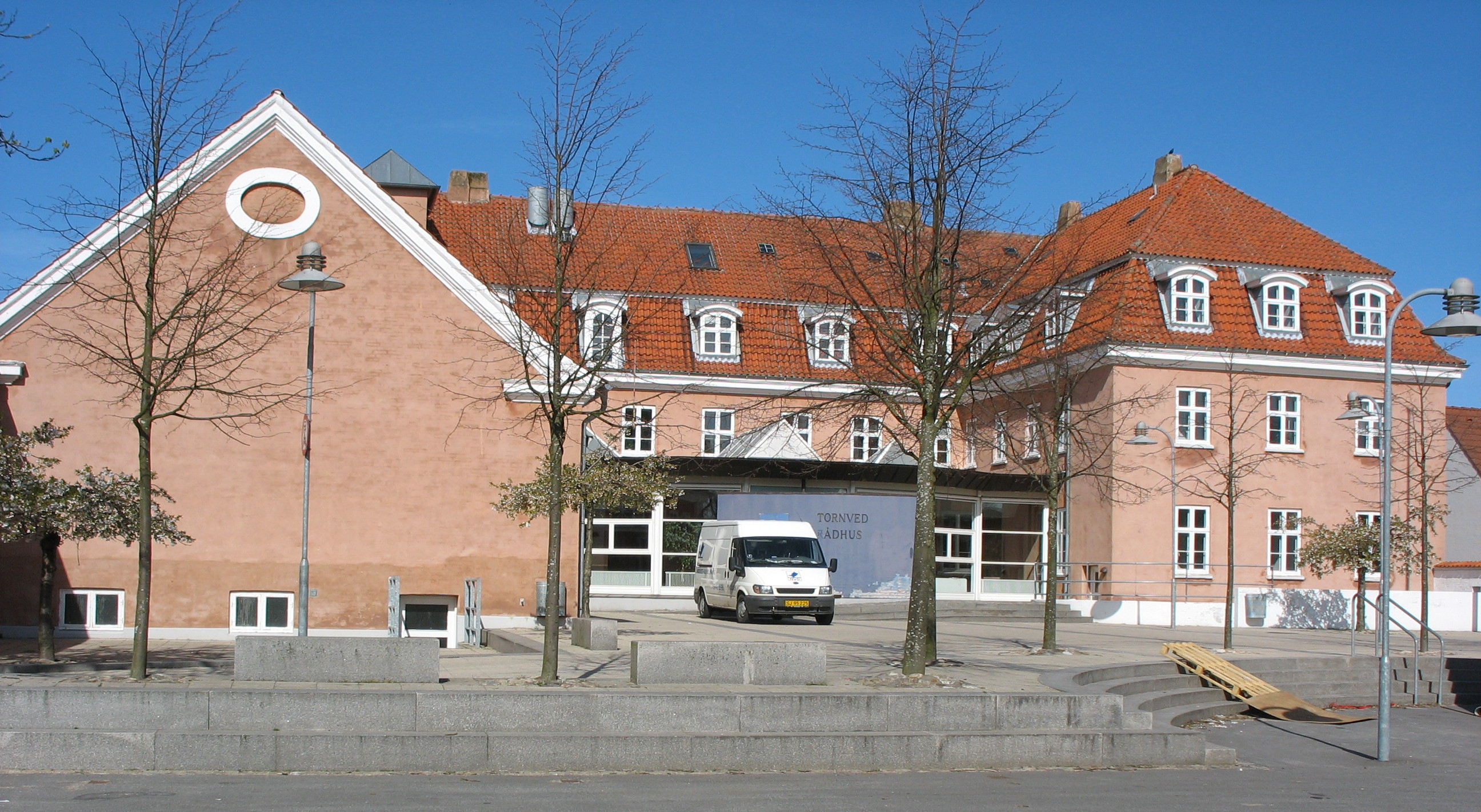
The old townhall building in Jyderup for the former Tornved Municipality

Jyderup is split in two parts divided by the road between Holbæk and Kalundborg named Skovvejen (English: Forest Road). The town is served by Jyderup railway station which is located on the railway line between Holbæk and Kalundborg.

The northeastern part is the oldest, containing the 13th-century church. The southwestern part was built when the railroad was constructed in the early 1900s, and contains most of the shops and stores in the town. In early 2008, the town library was also moved to this part, when the townhall building stood empty, after Tornved Municipality became part of Holbæk Municipality in 2007, and the local authority was moved out of the town for the sake of centralization.

== Notable people ==
- Malena Belafonte, former international fashion model turned singer, performer, producer, entrepreneur and creative director
- Kamilla Larsen (born 1983 in Jyderup), Danish team handball player
