= Holbæk Municipality =

Holbæk Municipality Holbæk Kommune (Danish)
- Municipality
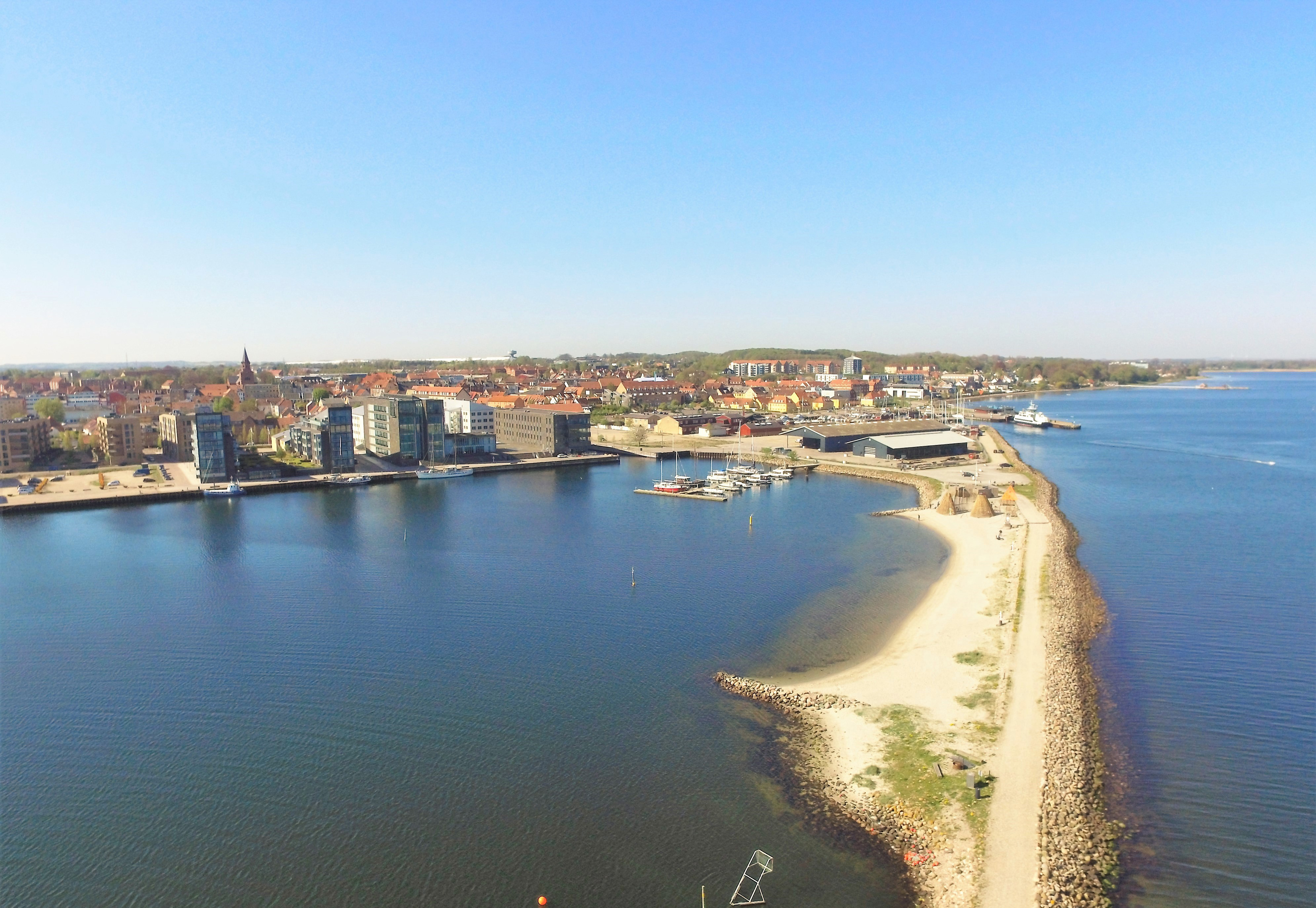

- Coat of arms

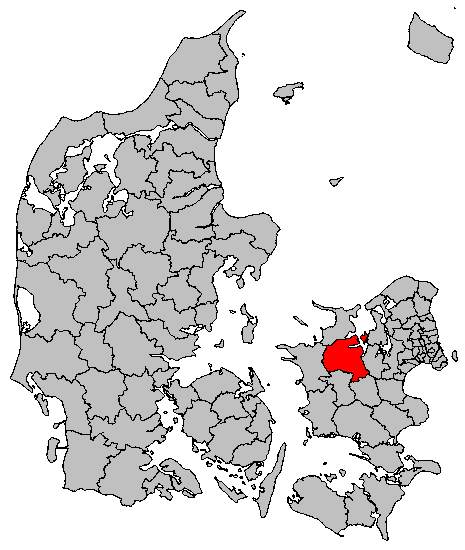
- Coordinates: 55°42′N 11°42′E
- Country: Denmark
- Region: Zealand
- Established: 2007
- Seat: Holbæk

Government
  - Mayor: Christina Krzyrosiak Hansen (S)

Area
  - Total: 578.7 km^{2} (223.4 sq mi)

Population (1 January 2026)
  - Total: 75,009
  - Density: 129.6/km^{2} (335.7/sq mi)
- Time zone: UTC+1 (CET)
  - Summer (DST): UTC+2 (CEST)
- Postal code: 4300
- Municipal code: 316
- Website: holbaek.dk

Holbæk Municipality (Danish: Holbæk Kommune) is a kommune in northwestern Region Sjælland on the island of Zealand in Denmark. The municipality includes the island of Orø, and covers an area of 583 km^{2}, and has a total population of 75,009 (2026). Its mayor is Christina Krzyrosiak Hansen, a member of the Social Democrats and the youngest mayor ever in Denmark. The main town and the site of its municipal council is the city of Holbæk. On 1 January 2007 Holbæk municipality was, as the result of Kommunalreformen ("The Municipal Reform" of 2007), merged with existing Jernløse, Svinninge, Tornved, and Tølløse municipalities to form a new Holbæk municipality.

== Politics ==
Holbæk's municipal council consists of 31 members, elected every four years. The municipal council has seven political committees.

=== Municipal council ===
Below are the municipal councils elected since the Municipal Reform of 2007.

Election	Party									Total seats	Turnout	Elected mayor
Election	A	B	C	F	I	L	O	V	Ø	Total seats	Turnout	Elected mayor
2005	9	5	1	2			2	12		31	69.2%	Jørn Sørensen (B)
2009	11	1	2	4			3	10		31	66.7%	Søren Kjærsgård (V)
2013	10	2	1				4	12	2	31	71.4%	Søren Kjærsgård (V)
2017	9	3	1	1	2	3	4	6	2	31	73.7%	Christina K. Hansen (A)
Data from Kmdvalg.dk 2005, 2009, 2013 and 2017

== Urban areas ==
The ten largest urban areas in the municipality are:

#	Locality	Population
1	Holbæk	27,055
2	Jyderup	3,937
3	Tølløse	3,797
4	Svinninge	2,741
5	Vipperød	2,252
6	Regstrup	2.052
7	Mørkøv	1,806
8	Gislinge	1,442
9	Store Merløse	1,197
10	Undløse	1,149

=== The town of Holbæk ===
The number of inhabitants on 1 January:

- 1980 - 29,578
- 1985 - 30,154
- 1990 - 31,151
- 1995 - 32,485
- 1999 - 33,555
- 2000 - 33,864
- 2003 - 34,500

== Image gallery ==
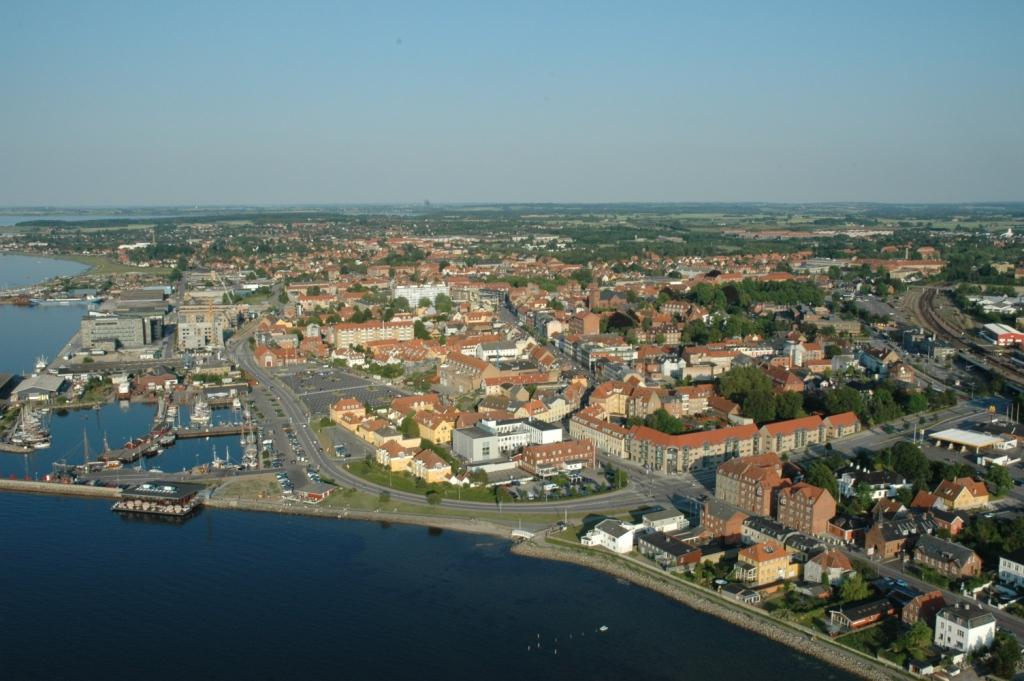
Holbæk from the air

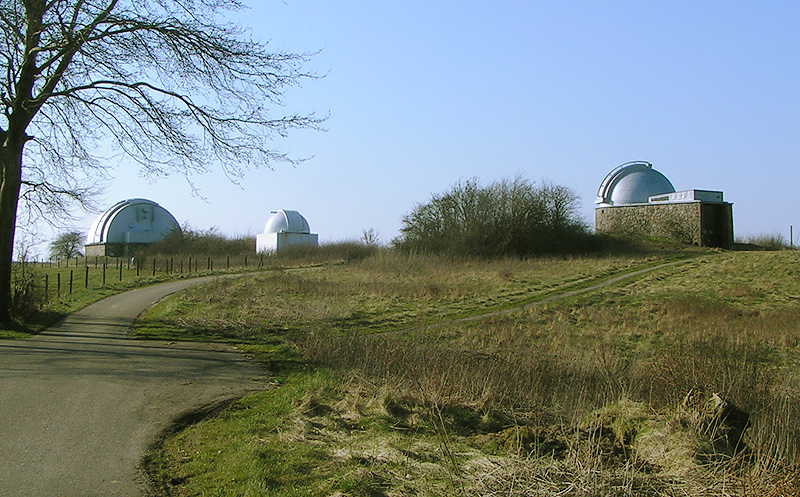
Brorfelde

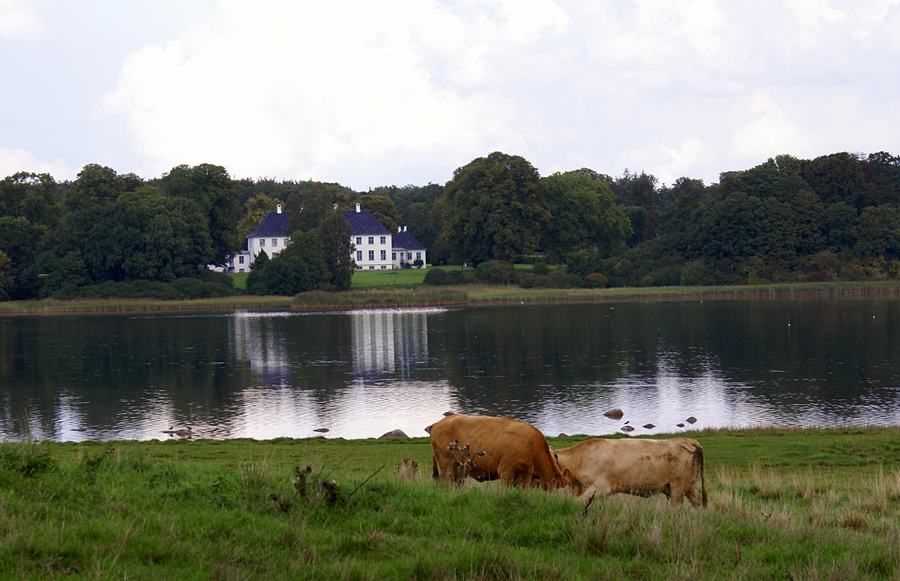
Eriksholm Castle

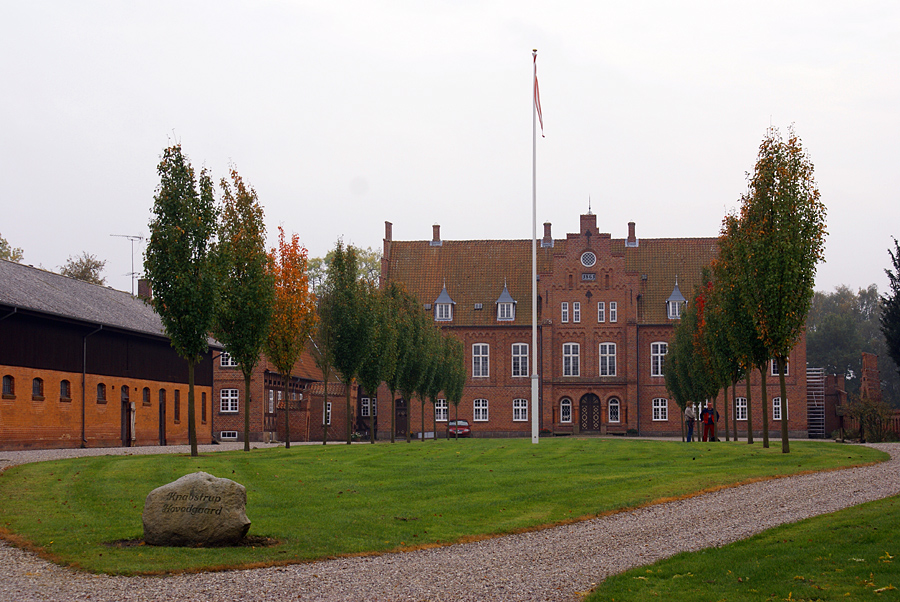
Knabstrup Manor
