= 2025 Kalundborg municipal election =

Municipal election in Denmark

← 2021	18 November 2025	2029 →

All 27 seats to the Kalundborg municipal council 14 seats needed for a majority
- Turnout: 25,672 (66.0%) ▲0.8%
	First party	Second party	Third party
	V	A	F
Party	Venstre	Social Democrats	Green Left
Last election	10 seats, 35.0%	8 seats, 26.0%	2 seats, 8.1%
Seats won	8	6	3
Seat change	▼2	▼2	▲1
Popular vote	7,395	4,755	3,007
Percentage	29.3%	18.8%	11.9%
Swing	▼5.7%	▼7.2%	▲3.8%
	Fourth party	Fifth party	Sixth party
	O	Æ	I
Party	Danish People's Party	Denmark Democrats	Liberal Alliance
Last election	2 seats, 7.0%	Did not stand	0 seats, 0.4%
Seats won	3	2	2
Seat change	▲1	▲2	▲2
Popular vote	2,566	1,688	1,237
Percentage	10.2%	6.7%	4.9%
Swing	▲3.1%	New	▲4.6%
	Seventh party	Eighth party	Ninth party
	Ø	L	B
Party	Red-Green Alliance	Kalundborg Listen	Social Liberals
Last election	1 seat, 5.4%	Did not stand	1 seat, 3.4%
Seats won	1	1	1
Seat change	0	▲1	0
Popular vote	1,050	858	841
Percentage	4.2%	3.4%	3.3%
Swing	▼1.3%	New	▼0.1%
Mayor before election
Martin Damm
Venstre
Mayor after election
Martin Damm
Venstre

The 2025 Kalundborg Municipal election was held on November 18, 2025, to elect the 27 members to sit in the regional council for the Kalundborg Municipal council, in the Danish city of Kalundborg, in the period of 2026 to 2029. Martin Damm from Venstre, would secure re-election.

== Background ==
Following the 2021 election, Martin Damm from Venstre became mayor for his fourth term. He would run for a fifth term.

== Electoral system ==
For elections to Danish municipalities, a number varying from 9 to 31 are chosen to be elected to the municipal council. The seats are then allocated using the D'Hondt method and a closed list proportional representation. Kalundborg Municipality had 27 seats in 2025.

== Electoral alliances ==
=== Electoral Alliance 1 ===
Party		Political alignment
A	Social Democrats	Centre-left
F	Green Left	Centre-left to Left-wing
Ø	Red-Green Alliance	Left-wing to Far-Left

=== Electoral Alliance 2 ===
Party		Political alignment
B	Social Liberals	Centre to Centre-left
L	Kalundborg Listen	Local politics

=== Electoral Alliance 3 ===
Party		Political alignment
C	Conservatives	Centre-right
O	Danish People's Party	Right-wing to Far-right
Æ	Denmark Democrats	Right-wing to Far-right

=== Electoral Alliance 4 ===
Party		Political alignment
E	Frit Borgerligt Fællesskab	Local politics
I	Liberal Alliance	Centre-right to Right-wing
N	Nyt Kalundborg	Local politics

=== Electoral Alliance 5 ===
Party		Political alignment
M	Moderates	Centre to Centre-right
V	Venstre	Centre-right

== Results by polling station ==
Division	A	B	C	E	F	I	L	M	N	O	V	Æ	Ø
Division	%	%	%	%	%	%	%	%	%	%	%	%	%
Snertinge	13.9	5.6	1.9	0.8	8.9	3.3	1.9	0.5	1.4	15.3	32.8	7.9	6.0
Sejerø	25.4	7.8	3.9	1.0	7.8	1.0	0.0	1.0	2.0	3.4	3.4	40.0	3.4
Svebølle	19.6	4.1	2.0	1.4	14.3	4.1	1.9	0.6	1.0	11.7	25.7	9.2	4.5
Gørlev	16.8	1.0	2.3	0.8	7.6	5.4	6.8	1.4	6.3	11.5	29.2	6.9	3.8
Kr. Helsinge	13.2	0.6	3.0	0.4	9.0	9.8	2.8	0.6	3.0	10.3	37.7	6.6	3.0
Reersø	12.3	1.9	2.1	0.8	11.0	2.9	7.0	0.3	4.5	9.1	33.2	7.8	7.2
Svallerup	16.9	2.0	2.5	1.3	7.1	4.3	10.2	0.4	3.1	10.5	31.7	6.3	3.6
Ubby	18.6	2.4	3.3	1.8	8.2	3.9	5.4	0.8	1.2	10.5	32.5	8.0	3.3
Høng	17.2	1.6	6.6	0.9	8.0	3.5	2.6	0.5	2.7	9.2	35.2	6.8	5.1
Buerup	14.5	3.7	3.3	0.5	12.2	3.9	4.0	0.8	1.0	8.3	29.2	9.7	9.0
Gierslev	14.7	2.3	5.6	0.8	9.5	4.8	1.2	0.5	2.2	8.6	35.7	10.7	3.4
Kalundborghallen	20.7	3.6	3.8	1.7	18.8	6.0	3.0	0.3	0.9	6.3	27.5	3.4	4.0
Rynkevang	23.7	3.5	2.2	1.6	14.8	4.6	2.7	0.4	1.4	13.2	22.2	6.3	3.5
Tømmerup	18.1	4.5	3.3	2.9	12.6	6.6	2.7	1.0	1.3	8.8	28.7	7.1	2.3
Årby-Rørby	19.8	3.3	3.1	3.5	11.9	4.7	5.0	0.3	1.4	12.7	26.0	6.5	1.8
Raklev	21.8	4.9	3.8	2.7	13.6	6.3	2.2	0.4	0.9	9.0	26.3	4.8	3.3
Røsnæs	14.9	4.0	3.8	2.7	21.5	4.2	2.5	1.0	0.4	13.8	21.8	2.5	6.9
Ulshøj	24.3	4.0	2.4	1.6	13.4	5.4	2.9	0.7	0.7	6.6	31.2	2.5	4.2

== Results ==
Party		Votes	%	+/-	Seats	+/-
Kalundborg Municipality
V	Venstre	7,395	29.30	-5.66	8	-2
A	Social Democrats	4,755	18.84	-7.19	6	-2
F	Green Left	3,007	11.91	+3.77	3	+1
O	Danish People's Party	2,566	10.17	+3.15	3	+1
Æ	Denmark Democrats	1,688	6.69	New	2	New
I	Liberal Alliance	1,237	4.90	+4.55	2	+2
Ø	Red-Green Alliance	1,050	4.16	-1.26	1	0
L	Kalundborg Listen	858	3.40	New	1	New
B	Social Liberals	841	3.33	-0.11	1	0
C	Conservatives	836	3.31	-1.55	0	-1
N	Nyt Kalundborg	452	1.79	New	0	New
E	Frit Borgerligt Fællesskab	404	1.60	New	0	New
M	Moderates	150	0.59	New	0	New
Total		25,239	100	N/A	27	N/A
Invalid votes		88	0.23	-0.19		
Blank votes		345	0.89	+0.04		
Turnout		25,672	65.97	+0.84		
Source: valg.dk

== Opinion polls ==
Polling firm	Fieldwork date	Sample size	V	A	F	O	Ø	C	B	I	E	L	M	N	Æ	Others	Lead
Epinion	4 Sep - 13 Oct 2025	487	26.3	22.2	11.2	10.6	6.7	2.9	2.1	4.8	–	–	1.6	–	8.5	3.0	4.1
2024 european parliament election	9 Jun 2024		15.8	18.7	14.2	11.2	4.8	6.9	3.9	5.6	–	–	5.8	–	11.5	–	2.9
2022 general election	1 Nov 2022		13.4	31.0	7.8	5.0	3.0	3.1	1.7	5.1	–	–	9.4	–	11.2	–	17.6
2021 regional election	16 Nov 2021		26.9	32.3	6.6	8.1	5.5	7.2	3.0	0.8	–	–	–	–	–	–	5.4
2021 municipal election	16 Nov 2021		35.0 (10)	26.0 (8)	8.1 (2)	7.0 (2)	5.4 (1)	4.9 (1)	3.4 (1)	0.4 (0)	–	–	–	–	–	–	9.0
