= 2021 Kalundborg municipal election =

- 16 November 2021

All 27 seats to the Kalundborg Municipal Council 14 seats needed for a majority
- Turnout: 25,600 (65.1%) ▼4.8pp
	First party	Second party	Third party
	V	A	D
Party	Venstre	Social Democrats	New Right
Last election	11 seats, 35.3%	8 seats, 25.5%	0 seats, 1.9%
Seats won	10	8	2
Seat change	▼1	0	▲2
Popular vote	8,778	6,536	2,097
Percentage	35.0%	26.0%	8.4%
Swing	▼0.3%	▲0.5%	▲6.5%
	Fourth party	Fifth party	Sixth party
	F	O	Ø
Party	Green Left	Danish People's Party	Red–Green Alliance
Last election	1 seat, 4.7%	5 seats, 16.2%	1 seat, 5.5%
Seats won	2	2	1
Seat change	▲1	▼3	0
Popular vote	2,046	1,763	1,361
Percentage	8.2%	7.0%	5.4%
Swing	▲3.5%	▼9.2%	▼0.1%
	Seventh party	Eighth party
	C	B
Party	Conservatives	Social Liberals
Last election	0 seats, 2.2%	1 seat, 4.0%
Seats won	1	1
Seat change	▲1	0
Popular vote	1,221	865
Percentage	4.9%	3.4%
Swing	▲2.7%	▼0.6%
Mayor before election
Martin Damm
Venstre
Mayor after election
Martin Damm
Venstre

Following the first election that was held after the 2007 municipal reform, Martin Damm from Venstre had been mayor of Kalundborg Municipality.

The traditional blue bloc had won 16 seats in 2017, 2 more than needed for a majority. For this election, Martin Damm would seek his 4th term.

In the result Venstre would once again become the largest party, with a majority of 9%. New Right would become the third largest party in terms of votes. It was the only municipality in the 2017 Danish local elections where they managed to finish in the top 3. The blue bloc had won 15 seats. It was later announced that Martin Damm would continue.

== Electoral system ==
For elections to Danish municipalities, a number varying from 9 to 31 are chosen to be elected to the municipal council. The seats are then allocated using the D'Hondt method and a closed list proportional representation. Kalundborg Municipality had 27 seats in 2021

Unlike in Danish General Elections, in elections to municipal councils, electoral alliances are allowed.

== Electoral alliances ==
=== Electoral Alliance 1 ===
Party		Political alignment
B	Social Liberals	Centre to Centre-left
C	Conservatives	Centre-right

=== Electoral Alliance 2 ===
Party		Political alignment
A	Social Democrats	Centre-left
F	Green Left	Centre-left to Left-wing
H	Demokratisk Fællesliste	Local politics
Ø	Red–Green Alliance	Left-wing to Far-Left

=== Electoral Alliance 3 ===
Party		Political alignment
D	New Right	Right-wing to Far-right
I	Liberal Alliance	Centre-right to Right-wing
O	Danish People's Party	Right-wing to Far-right

== Results by polling station ==
H = Demokratisk Fællesliste

Division	A	B	C	D	F	H	I	O	V	Æ	Ø
Division	%	%	%	%	%	%	%	%	%	%	%
Snertinge	20.2	4.4	4.9	7.3	5.4	1.7	0.1	9.5	38.8	0.9	7.0
Sejerø	16.4	1.3	1.3	1.7	1.7	1.3	0.4	9.1	63.4	0.4	3.0
Svebølle	27.5	1.8	3.8	8.7	12.7	2.3	0.3	8.7	27.8	1.1	5.4
Gørlev	30.8	1.3	3.3	7.4	5.9	0.3	0.4	6.1	40.2	0.3	4.1
Ubby	26.7	2.3	3.4	10.5	5.9	0.3	0.3	7.2	39.7	0.6	3.0
Svallerup	26.2	2.9	2.9	7.9	6.1	0.3	0.3	6.7	42.1	0.4	4.1
Reersø	30.6	0.3	2.9	6.0	5.5	0.8	0.5	5.0	41.6	1.0	5.8
Kr. Helsinge	21.4	2.4	4.6	8.3	5.7	0.0	0.6	5.1	46.6	0.5	5.0
Høng	30.1	1.8	9.5	6.7	5.8	0.2	0.4	5.4	33.2	0.8	6.0
Buerup	22.0	2.9	6.5	6.3	8.3	0.6	1.1	5.5	33.6	0.6	12.7
Gierslev	20.3	2.3	7.9	7.7	7.5	0.0	0.5	6.1	40.4	1.2	6.1
Kalundborghallen	25.6	5.1	5.2	7.6	11.4	1.0	0.3	5.1	31.7	0.4	6.6
Raklev	23.8	6.0	5.3	10.2	10.2	0.3	0.2	6.8	31.3	0.3	5.7
Årby-Rørby	28.1	3.4	4.2	11.5	6.7	0.7	0.3	10.0	32.4	0.3	2.4
Tømmerup	21.4	4.5	4.3	12.5	7.1	0.4	0.4	7.5	36.4	0.6	4.8
Rynkevang	31.3	3.8	3.5	9.1	8.9	1.1	0.3	9.0	27.4	0.7	5.0
Røsnæs	17.9	5.1	3.8	9.2	11.5	0.6	0.0	7.9	31.3	0.2	12.4
Ulshøj	27.7	5.3	3.5	5.8	9.5	1.4	0.4	5.6	36.7	0.4	3.7

== Results ==
Party		Votes	%	+/-	Seats	+/-
Kalundborg Municipality
V	Venstre	8,778	34.96	-0.35	10	-1
A	Social Democrats	6,536	26.03	+0.52	8	0
D	New Right	2,097	8.35	+6.47	2	+2
F	Green Left	2,046	8.15	+3.46	2	+1
O	Danish People's Party	1,763	7.02	-9.13	2	-3
Ø	Red-Green Alliance	1,361	5.42	-0.11	1	0
C	Conservatives	1,221	4.86	+2.66	1	+1
B	Social Liberals	865	3.44	-0.53	1	0
H	Demokratisk Fællesliste	204	0.81	New	0	New
Æ	Freedom List	151	0.60	New	0	New
I	Liberal Alliance	88	0.35	-1.45	0	0
Total		25,110	100	N/A	27	N/A
Invalid votes		163	0.41	+0.07		
Blank votes		327	0.83	+0.08		
Turnout		25,600	65.14	-4.77		
Source: valg.dk
