= List of churches in Kalundborg Municipality =

1: Sejerø 2: Røsnæs 3: Raklev 4: Bregninge 5: Føllenslev 6: Særslev 7: Vor Frue 8: Nyvang 9: Tømmerup 10: Værslev 11: Viskinge 12: Bjergsted 13: Årby 14: Rørby 15: Ubby 16: Aunsø 17: Svallerup 18: Lille Fuglede 19: Jorløse 20: Buerup 21: Store Fuglede 22: Gørlev 23: Bakkendrup 24: Hallenslev 25: Sæby 26: Reerslev 27: Kirke Helsinge 28: Finderup 29: Drøsselbjerg 30: Gierslev 31: Solbjerg 32: Ørslev 33: Alleshave 34: Reersø

This list of churches in Kalundborg Municipality lists church buildings in Kalundborg Municipality, Denmark. The municipality is situated on the northwestern part of the island of Zealand and also comprises the smaller islands of Sejerø and Nekselø.

== Overview ==
Kalundborg Municipality belongs to the Diocese of Roskilde, a diocese within the Evangelical Lutheran Church of Denmark. It is divided into 34 parishes. The parish of Gierslev contains two churches, Gierslev Church and Vester Løve Church. Ubberup Church belongs to a so-called valgmenighed.

The municipality's largest and most notable church is the five-towered Church of Our Lady which stands on a hill above the historical centre of Kalundborg. Apart from that, the area is characterized by its many white-washed parish churches from the 13th century. The churches in Gørlev, Rørby, Sæby, Tømmerup, Viskinge and Ørslev all feature medieval church frescos.

== List ==
Name	Location	Year	Coordinates	Image	Refs
Alleshave Church	Alleshave	1928			
Bakkendrup Church	Bakkedrup	c. 1100			
Bjergsted Church	Bjergsted	c. 1100			
Bregninge Church	Bregninge	c. 1100	55°41′3.11″N 11°18′36″E		
Church of Our Lady	Kalundborg	c. 1200	55°40′49.65″N 11°4′51″E		
Buerup Church	Buerup	1887	55°35′32.63″N 11°20′31.2″E		
Drøsselbjerg Church	Dr'sselbjerg	c. 1100			
Finderup Church	Finderup				
Føllenslev Church	Føllenslev				
Gammel Alunsø Church	Gammel Alunsø				
Gierslev Church	Gierslev				
Gørlev Church	Gørlev				
Hallenslev Church	Hallenslev				
Jorløse Church	Jorløse				
Kirke Helsinge Church	Kirke Helsinge				
Lille Fuglede Church	Lille Fuglede				
Nekselø Church	Nekselø				
Nyvangs Church	Kalundborg	1974	55°40′57.7″N 11°5′51″E		
Raklev Church	Raklev				
Reerslev Church	Reerslev				
Reersø Church	Reersø	1904	55°31′32.4″N 11°6′41″E		
Rørby Church	Rørby				
Røsnæs Church	Rørnæs				
Sejerø Church	Sejerø	c. 1275	55°52′54.5″N 11°8′35″E		
Store Fuglede Church	Store Fuglede				
Svallerup Church	Svallerup				
Sæby Church	Sæby				
Særslev Church	Særslev				
Tømmerup Church	Tømmerup				
Ubberup Church	Ubberup				
Ubby Church	Ubby				
Ulstrup Church	Ulstrup				
Vester Løve Church	Vester Løve				
Viskinge Church	Viskinge	c. 1200	55°39′42.47″N 11°16′12.35″E		
Værslev Church	Værslev				
Ørslev Church	Ørslev				
Årby Church	Årby				

== See also ==
- List of churches in Odsherred Municipality
- List of churches in Næstved Municipality
