= Kaldred =

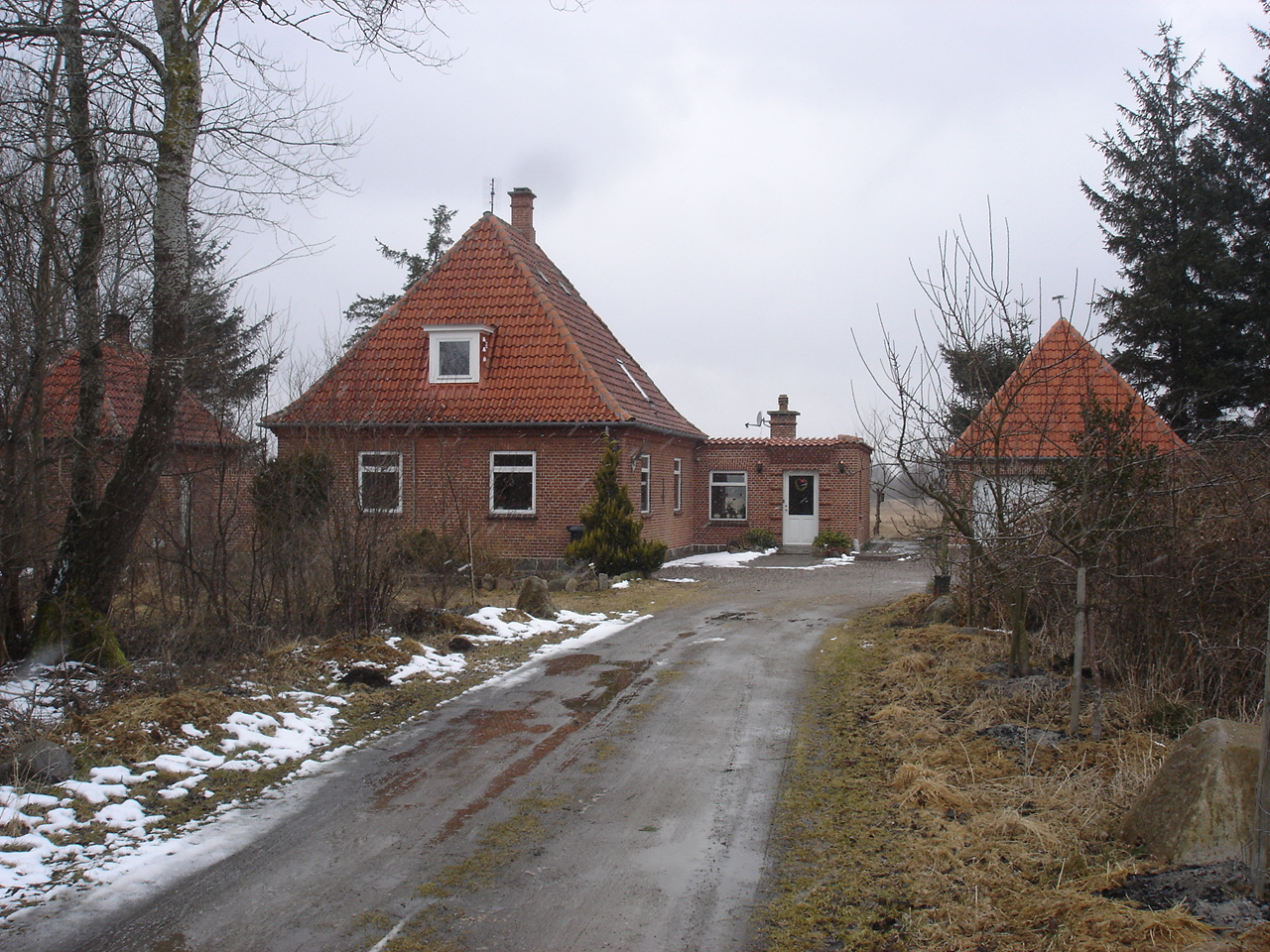
- Kaldred Station

- Location of Kaldred in Denmark
- Coordinates: 55°42′4″N 11°15′51″E
- Country: Denmark
- Region: Region Zealand
- Municipality: Kalundborg

Population (2026)
  - Total: 427
- Time zone: UTC+1 (CET)
  - Summer (DST): UTC+2 (CEST)
- Postal codes: 4593

Kaldred is a holiday home area in Kalundborg Municipality, in the Region Zealand. It is located 9 km (5.6 mi) southwest of Havnsø, 9 km (5.6 mi) north of Svebølle and 12 km (7.5 mi) east of Kalundborg. Kaldred is only a few kilometers from Saltbæk Vig and Sejerø Bugt.

== Transport ==
Kalundborg Airfield, also called Kaldred Airfield, is located between the holiday home area and Saltbæk Vig. It is owned by Kalundborg Municipality and is used especially by gliders and motor pilots from Kalundborg Flyveklub, which has been based here since 1961, and Polyteknisk Flyvegruppe. The airport has a 700 m (2,300 ft) long asphalt runway as well as take-off play and wire pick-up for use by gliders.
