= Kristian Larsen =

Danish gymnast (1895–1972)

- Full name: Niels Kristian Ferdinand Larsen
- Born: 2 February 1895 Bjergsted, Denmark
- Died: 19 June 1972 (aged 77) Ubby, Denmark

Gymnastics career
- Discipline: Men's artistic gymnastics
- Country represented: Denmark
Medal record
Men's artistic gymnastics
Representing Denmark
Olympic Games
Silver medal – second place	1920 Antwerp	Team, Swedish system

Niels Kristian Ferdinand Larsen (2 February 1895 in Bjergsted, Denmark – 19 June 1972 in Ubby, Denmark) was a Danish gymnast who competed in the 1920 Summer Olympics. He was part of the Danish team, which was able to win the silver medal in the gymnastics men's team, Swedish system event in 1920.
