= Niels Cristian Nielsen =

Danish artistic gymnast

- Born: 10 January 1897 Ubby, Denmark
- Died: 12 April 1972 (aged 75) Slagelse, Denmark

Gymnastics career
- Discipline: Men's artistic gymnastics
- Country represented: Denmark
Medal record
Men's artistic gymnastics
Representing Denmark
Olympic Games
Silver medal – second place	1920 Antwerp	Team, Swedish system

Niels Cristian Nielsen (10 January 1897 in Ubby, Denmark – 12 April 1972 in Slagelse, Denmark) was a Danish gymnast who competed in the 1920 Summer Olympics. He was part of the Danish team, which won the silver medal in the gymnastics men's team, Swedish system event in 1920.
