= Høng Bog og Papirhandel =

Danish nookstore (1883-2011)

Høng Boghandel
- Company type: Private
- Industry: Retail; Bookshop
- Founded: 1883; 143 years ago
- Founder: Johannes Sørensen
- Headquarters: Høng, Denmark
- Products: Books, stationery

Høng Boghandel was an independent Danish book retailer established in 1883. It closed in 2011.

== History and developments ==
The independent bookstore was originally founded by Johannes Sørensen on November 11, 1912. In 1916, it was taken over by Sven Thorbek, who moved the store from Hovedgaden no. 15 to no. 33 in 1922. Sven Thorbek died in 1947, and his wife, Kirsten Thorbek, took over and ran the business.

In 1962, their son Mogens Thorbek became the owner of the bookstore. The bookstore celebrated its 60th anniversary on November 1, 1977. On December 5, 1983, after being owned by the Thorbek family for 67 years, the bookstore was taken over by a limited company, and Johannes. Helweg became the professional leader.

John Petersen became the professional manager on January 1, 1985, and on November 1, 1986, the bookstore welcomed a new academic manager, Grethe Bukrinsky. However, in 1989, the store went into receivership on October 31.

On March 1, 1990, the business was assumed as a cash bookshop and Mogens Thorbek returned as the manager. He was over 70 years old at the time. On June 21, 1990, Birgitte Nielsen became the technical manager. Lykke Bjørn Rasmussen returned as the professional manager on February 1, 1991.

Liselotte Hansen became the academic manager in 1999. The independent bookstore closed its doors on June 30, 2011.

== Thorbek family history ==
=== Sven Thorbek & Kirsten Svendsen ===
Sven Thorbek (9.12.1885 - 1947, Odense) was the son of headmaster Kristian Sørensen Thorbek (born March 15, 1853) and Kristine Nielsen (born July 31, 1853). He was an apprentice at Edv. G. Hansen in Odense and worked as an assistant at Axel Andersen and Axel E. Aamodt, both in Copenhagen, as well as at Chr. G. Kielberg in Svendborg and C. Ferslew & Co. in Copenhagen. He spent a couple of years away from the bookstore, but returned to work as an assistant at J. Gjellerup in 1914-15 and E. Henningsen in Holbæk in 1915-16 before taking over the bookstore in Høng. He married Kirsten Vilhelmine Svendsen (born March 21, 1887) on October 24, 1918. She was born in Køge, daughter of butcher Henrik Gustav Svendsen (born June 14, 1862) and Karen Sofie Nielsen (born October 22, 1864). After her husband's death, she ran the business for 15 years until 1962, when their son Mogens Thorbek took over (source: Dolleris IV etc.).

=== Mogens Thorbek & Inger Thorbek ===
Mogens Thorbek (born June 19, 1919) Son of bookdealer Sven Thorbek (December 9, 1885 – 1947) and Kirsten Vilhelmine Svendsen (born March 21, 1887) in Høng. He apprenticed in Ringsted and Rønne from 1939 to 1941, then worked as an assistant in Tønder, Åbybro, Silkeborg, and Hillerød. He took over the family bookstore in Høng from his mother in 1962. In 1983, the business was turned into a limited company with various professional leaders: Johs. Helweg, John Petersen, Grethe Bukrinsky, and Lykke Bjørn Rasmussen. However, in 1989, the bookstore went into receivership. Mogens Thorbek, now 70 years old, took over once again, and the bookstore operated as a cash bookstore for a few years before getting back on its feet.
