= Church of Our Lady, Kalundborg =

Coordinates: 55°40′49.57″N 11°4′51.17″E

Church of Our Lady
- Vor Frue Kirke
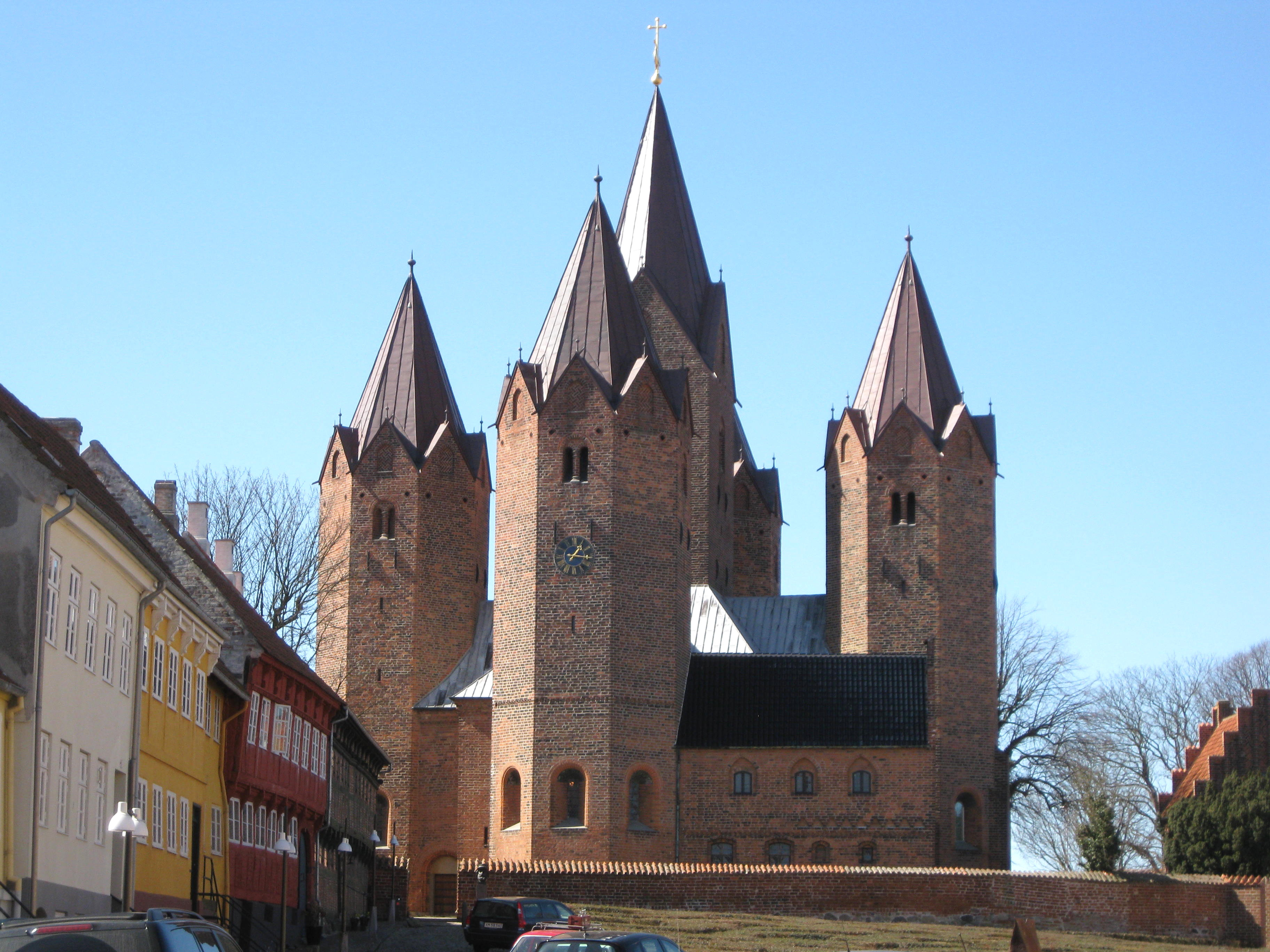
- Church of Our Lady
- Location: Kalundborg
- Country: Denmark
- Denomination: Church of Denmark

History
- Founded: 1170

Architecture
- Years built: 13th century

Administration
- Diocese: Diocese of Roskilde
- Deanery: Kalundborg Provsti
- Parish: Vor Frue Sogn

The Church of Our Lady (Vor Frue Kirke, Kalundborg) is a historical building at Kalundborg in northwestern Zealand, Denmark. The precise date of construction is not known with any certainty, though its architecture indicates the early part of the 13th century. With its five distinctive towers, it stands on a hill above the harbour, making it the town's most imposing landmark.

== History ==
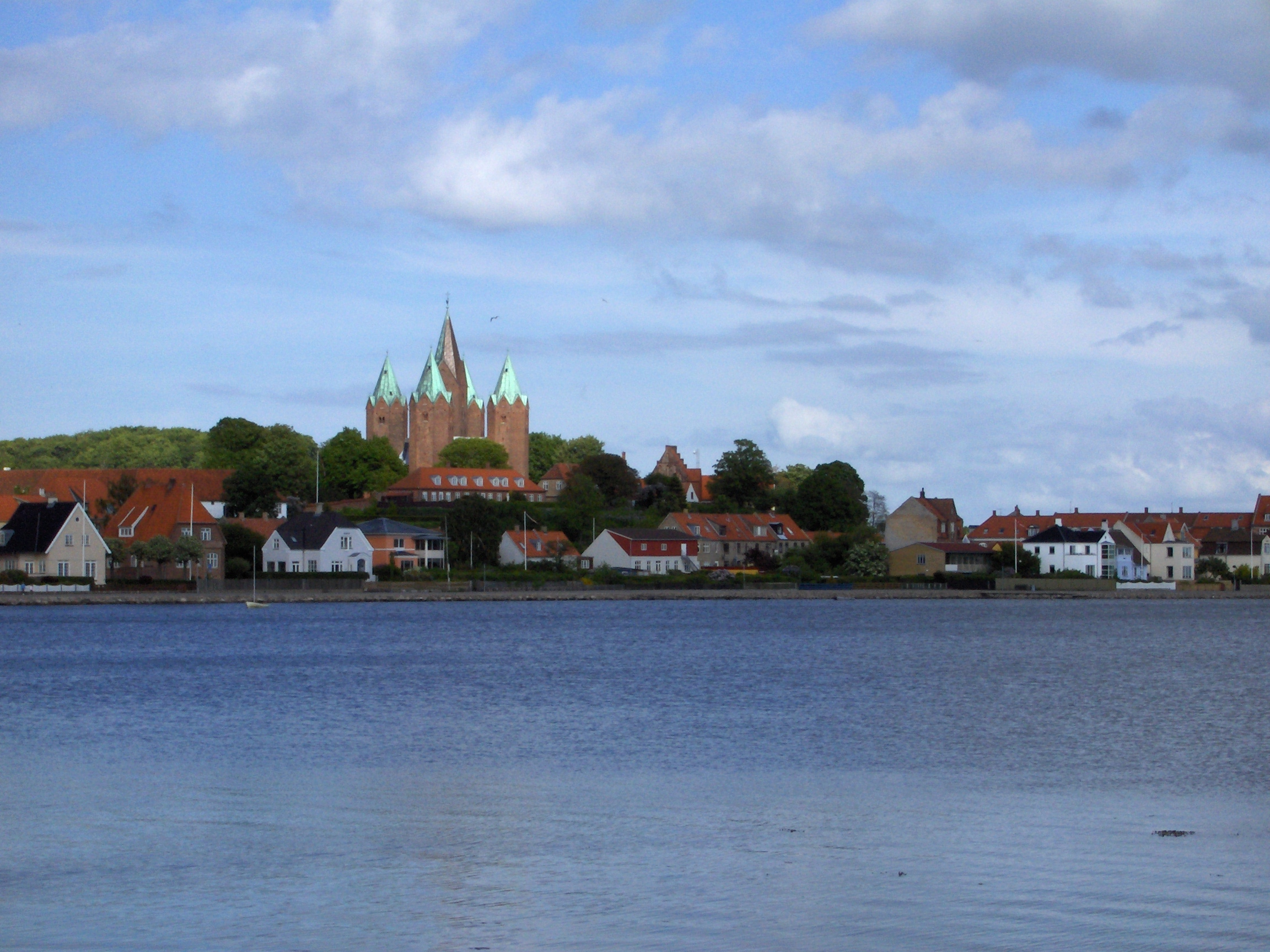
The church seen from the sea

The church is built of red brick, indicating that it was constructed no earlier than 1170 when brick was first used in Denmark. Coincidentally, this is also the date of the site's first fortification, the nearby castle of Esbern Snare (1127–1204). The architectural design, however, would indicate a rather later date, possibly in the first three decades of the 13th century.

At the time when the church was built, a small medieval town stood on the hill. It was originally fortified by Snare's castle but this was replaced in the 14th century by Kalundborg Friary, now in ruins, with its ring walls and ditches. Much of this has now disappeared but the old churchyard walls are still intact. Two brick houses from 1500 form part of the boundary walls and a few brick houses near the church are evidence of the prosperity the town enjoyed in the 15th century.

The central tower of the church collapsed in 1827 due to structural flaws and incautious repairs inside the church. Collapse did not cause any injuries but many medieval furnishings were destroyed.

As the church had fallen into a state of disrepair by the beginning of the 19th century, restoration work was carried out first from 1867 to 1871 under the leadership of architect Vilhelm Tvede (1826–1891) when the central tower was rebuilt. Later from 1917 to 1921 the three entrances and the windows were reconstructed under architect Mogens Clemmensen (1885–1943) and his father Andreas Clemmensen (1852–1928). From the square nave, four arms of equal length stretch out to a polygon terminal. These proportions have been compared to the description of the New Jerusalem in the Book of Revelation. While the original barrel vaults of the transepts are still in place, the columns in the nave and the vaults have been reconstructed. The medieval sacristy (1400) along the north wall of the chancel is well preserved. In about 1500 it was given an upper storey.

== Architecture ==
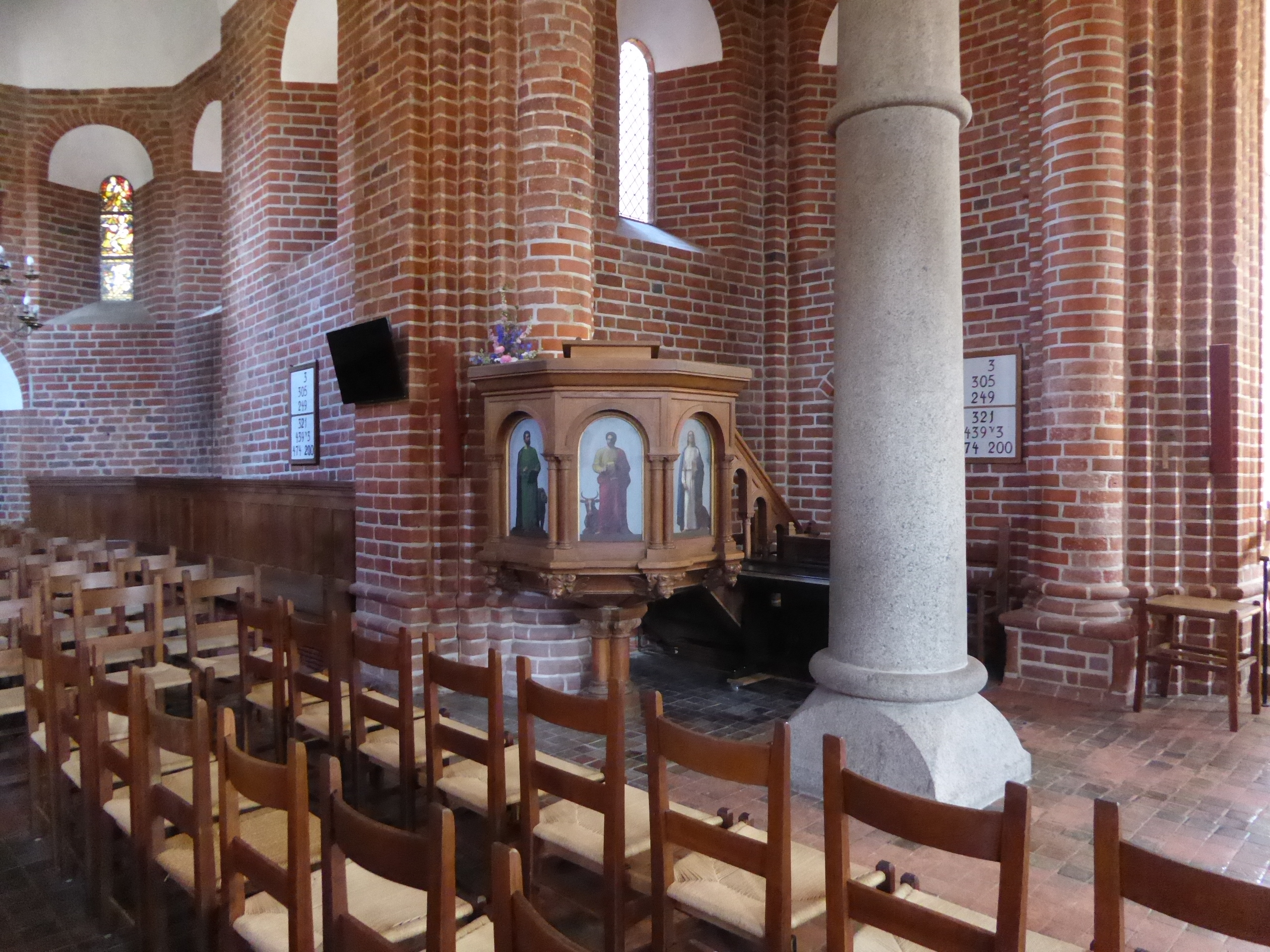
Church of Our Lady interior view

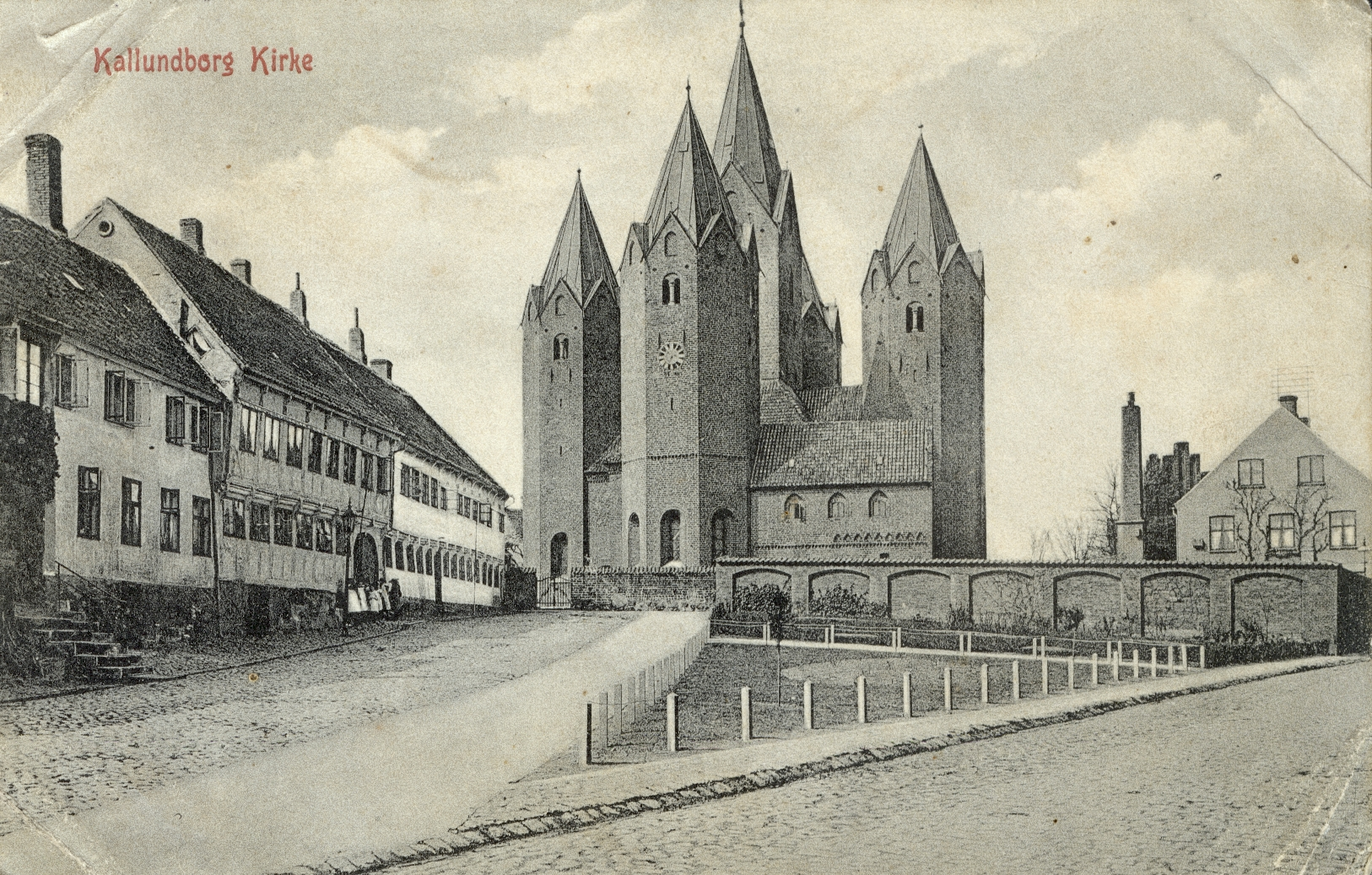
Old postcard drawing of the church

The plan is in the form of a Greek cross with four arms of equal length. The window arches as well as the pilasters and sunken columns inside the church suggest the involvement of Lombard builders from northern Italy. It is said to be Denmark's most important contribution to architecture during the Middle Ages.

The church's central tower, known as Mary's tower (after the Virgin Mary), is 44 m tall and square-shaped while the four lateral towers, each 34 m tall, are octagonal. The other towers are also named after saints: St. Anne's to the east, St. Gertrude's to the west, St. Mary Magdalene's to the south and St. Catherine's to the north. The four columns supporting the central tower are made of granite, providing additional strength. With five towers in all, the church is unique.

The architecture reveals similarities with the Church of the Holy Sepulchre, as well as with grouped towers in the great churches of France and the Rhineland. In particular, both the church's age and its architectural style have much in common with Tournai Cathedral in the south of Belgium. The masonry, on the other hand, is comparable to that of other early brick buildings in the area such as St. Bendt's Church in Ringsted.

== Decoration and furnishings ==
Little remains of the church's original furnishings apart from the granite font, sculpted by a mason who worked for the Esbern Snare family. There is also a wooden crucifix (c. 1500) from the rood altar and two pairs of candlesticks.

A mural fragment (c. 1225) in the north window of the chancel shows that the interior was once decorated with wall paintings or kalkmalerier.

The altarpiece was designed in 1650 by woodcarver Lorentz Jørgensen (c.1644–c.1681) of Holbæk while the pulpit (1871) is the work of Vilhelm Tvede.

The church has four bells. The oldest bell was cast in 1502 by Olaus Benedicti. The next one was cast in 1702 by Steffen Scherrenbein. The next one was cast in 1732 by Johan Barthold Holtzmann. The newest bell was cast in 1939 by Brønderslev.

The organ loft above the porch in the west transept was completed in 1921 but the organ was built by Theodor Frobenius & Co in 1957.

== Possible candidate for UNESCO World Heritage ==
In December 2008, Kalundborg municipality, supported by a group of leading Danish architects, urged the Danish cultural authorities to submit a request to UNESCO for inclusion of the Church of Our Lady in the World Heritage list.

== See also ==
- List of churches in Kalundborg Municipality
- Architecture of Denmark
- Brick Romanesque
