= Kalundborg Airfield =

Kalundborg Airfield Kalundborg Flyveplads
- IATA: none; ICAO: EKKL

Summary
- Airport type: Public
- Owner: Kalundborg Municipality
- Operator: Kalundborg Flyveplads ApS
- Serves: Kalundborg
- Location: Kaldred
- Coordinates: 55°42′00″N 11°14′58″E

Map
- Location of airfield in Denmark

Runways
Direction	Length		Surface
Direction	ft	m	Surface
09L/27R	2,293	699	Asphalt
09R/27L

Kalundborg Airfield, also called Kaldred Airfield, is an airfield located in Kaldred, right next to Saltbæk Vig approx. 15 km (9.3 mi) outside Kalundborg. The airfield has a 699 meter long and 18 meter wide paved east/west facing runway as well as grass runways north and south of the paved runway.

Kalundborg Airfield is primarily used by the glider clubs Kalundborg Flyveklub and Polyteknisk Flyvegruppe.

The first flight in Denmark with an electric plane took place in 2019 from Kalundborg Airfield.
