= Bjergsted =

Former municipality in Denmark

Coordinates: 55°40′N 11°22′E

Until 1 January 2007, Bjergsted was a municipality (Danish, kommune) in West Zealand County on the west coast of the island of Zealand (Sjælland) in Denmark. The municipality included the islands of Sejerø and Nekselø, and covered an area of 138.62 km^{2}. It had a total population of 8,047 (2005). Its last mayor was Gert Larsen, a member of the Venstre (Liberal Party) political party. The main town and the site of its municipal council was the town of Svebølle.

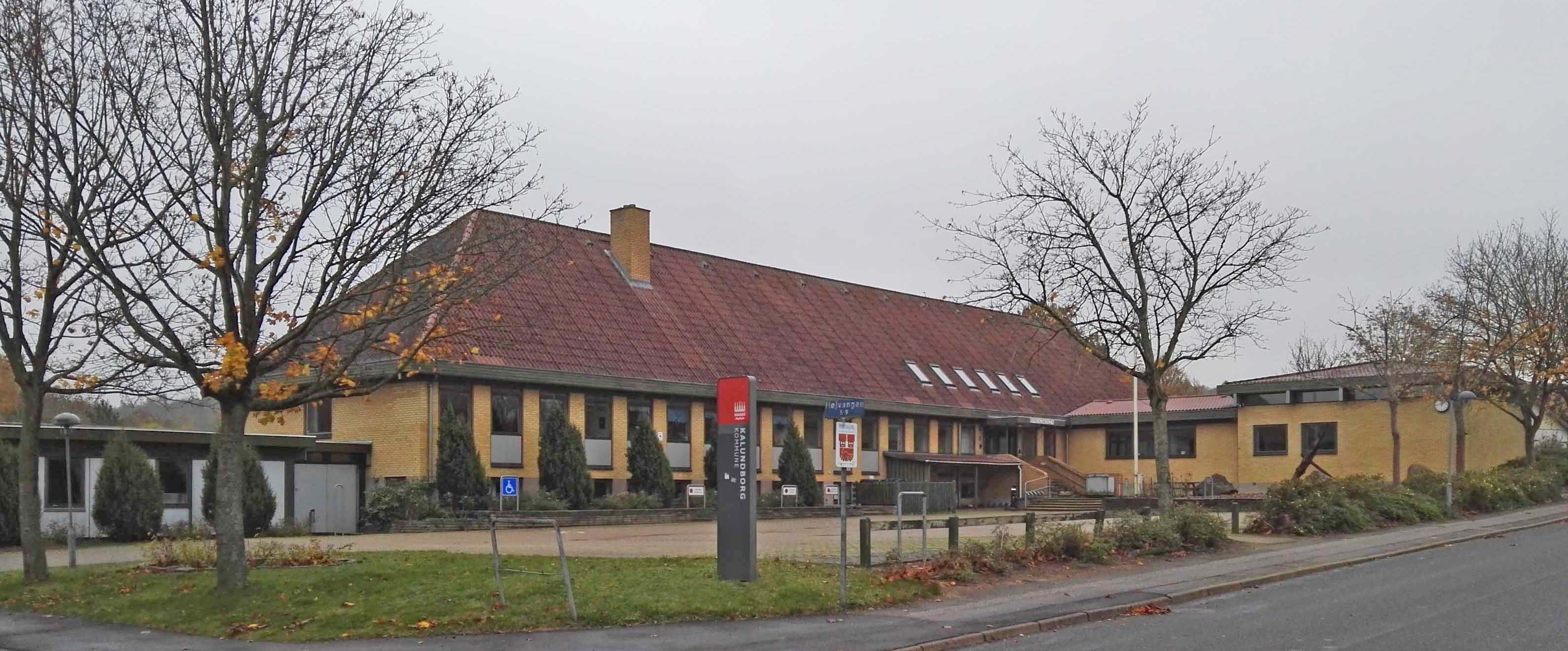
The former townhall of Bjergsted Municipality in Svebølle

Bjergsted municipality ceased to exist as the result of Kommunalreformen ("The Municipality Reform" of 2007). It was merged into the Kalundborg municipality along with former Gørlev, Hvidebæk, Høng, and Kalundborg municipalities. This created a municipality with an area of 598 km^{2} and a total population of 48,697 (2005).
