= Havnsø =

- town
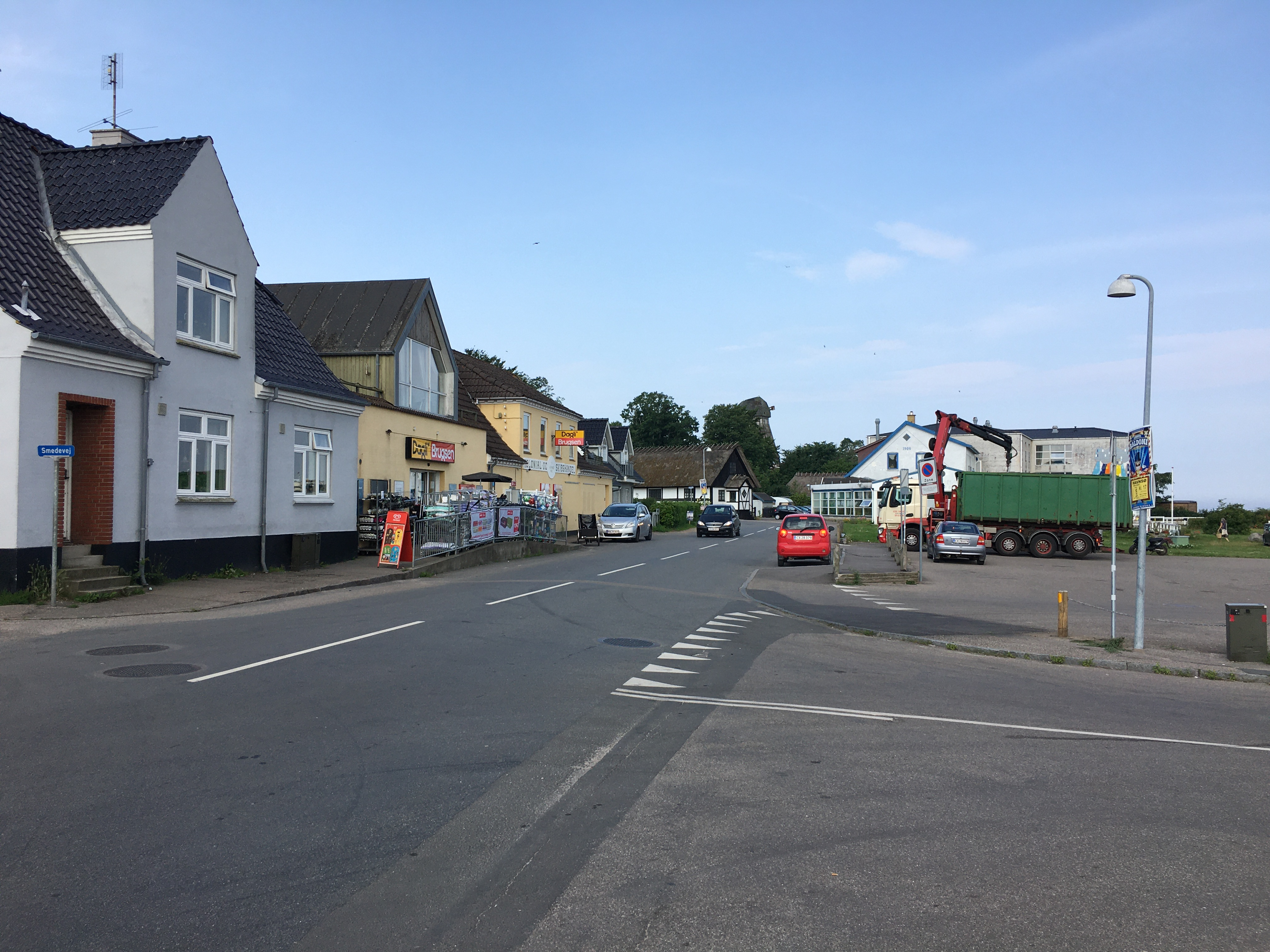
- Road by the harbor in Havnsø.

- Location in Region Zealand Havnsø (Denmark)
- Coordinates: 55°45′11″N 11°19′14″E
- Country: Denmark
- Region: Region Zealand
- Municipality: Kalundborg Municipality

Population (2026)
  - Total: 938

Havnsø is a small harbour town, with a population of 938 (1 January 2026). It is situated on the northwest coast of the Danish island of Zealand, in the northeastern corner of Kalundborg Municipality at the boundary between Kalundborg and Odsherred Municipality.

The harbour has ferry connections to the islands of Nekselø and Sejerø.

K-Salat, a manufacturer of salat spreeds, dressing, mayonnaise and remoulade sold to the retail trade and food service customers in Denmark and abroad, is located in the town.
