= Nekselø =

Island in Denmark

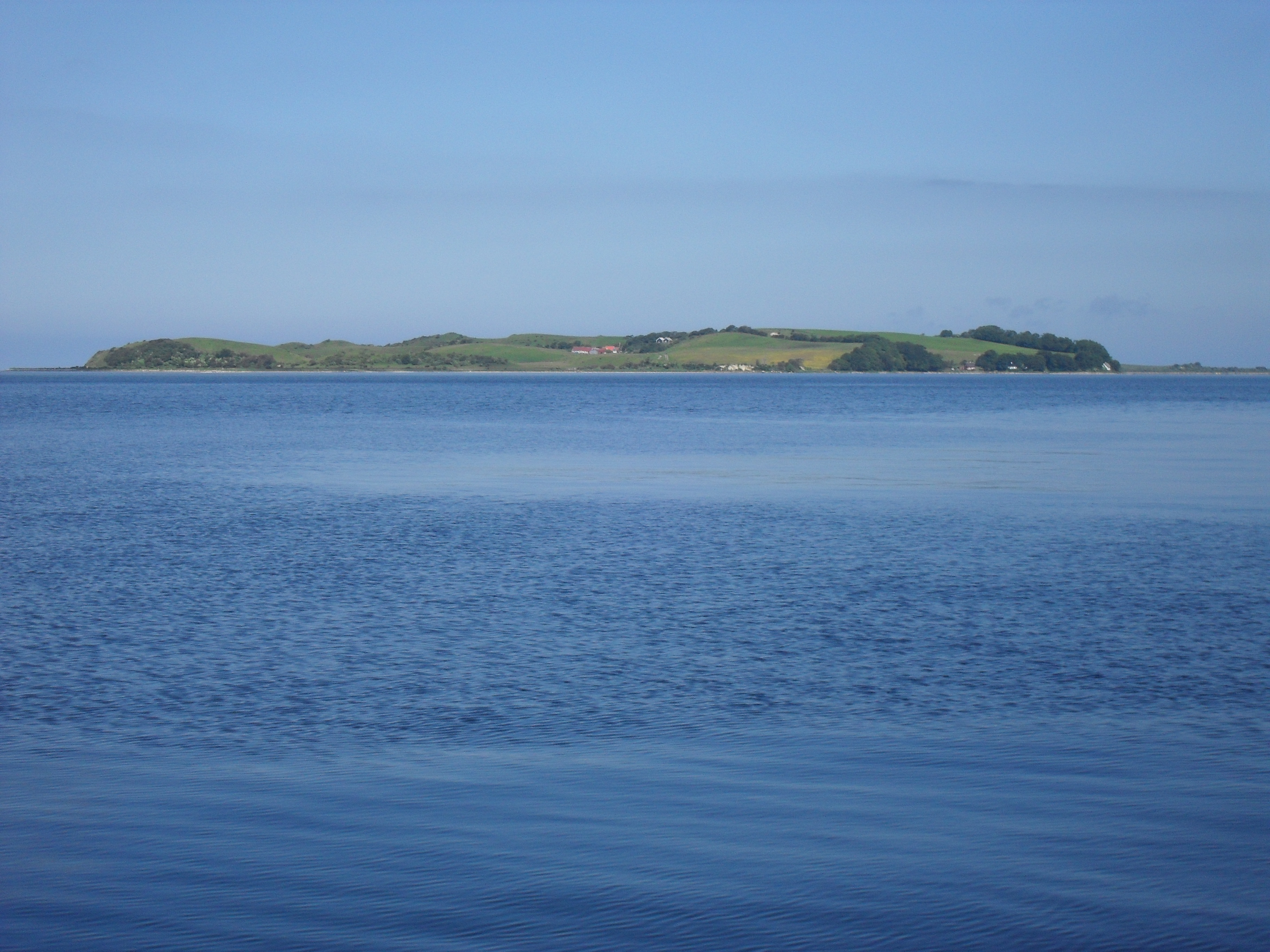
- Nekselø

- Location within Denmark

Geography
- Location: Kattegat
- Coordinates: 55°46′49.2″N 11°17′30.2″E
- Area: 2.20 km^{2} (0.85 sq mi)
- Highest elevation: 41 m (135 ft)
- Highest point: Elmebjerg and Gadebjerg

Administration
- Denmark
- Region: Region Zealand
- Municipality: Kalundborg Municipality

Demographics
- Population: 15 (2025)
- Pop. density: 6.8/km^{2} (17.6/sq mi)

Additional information
- listed island

Nekselø is a small Danish island in the Kattegat off the west coast of Zealand in the Bay of Sejrø. Nekselø has an area of 2.2 km^{2} and is part of Kalundborg Municipality. As of 1 January 2025, it had a population of 15.

== Description ==
Nekselø consists of an impressive row of hills which culminates at a height of 41 meters at Elmebjerg and Gadebjerg. The cliffs on the west coast are characterised by bushes shaped by the winds. On the east coast, there are coastal meadows and grasslands with woodlands in between, presenting a variety of tree species. The island is a popular venue for tourists. There are ferry connections to Havnsø on Zealand with a travel time of about 20 min. Cars are not allowed on the island.

=== Nature ===
Because of its special nature, the entire island was listed in 1951. Human traffic is prohibited outside the official nature paths from 1 April to 15 July, when birds are breeding.

== Gallery ==
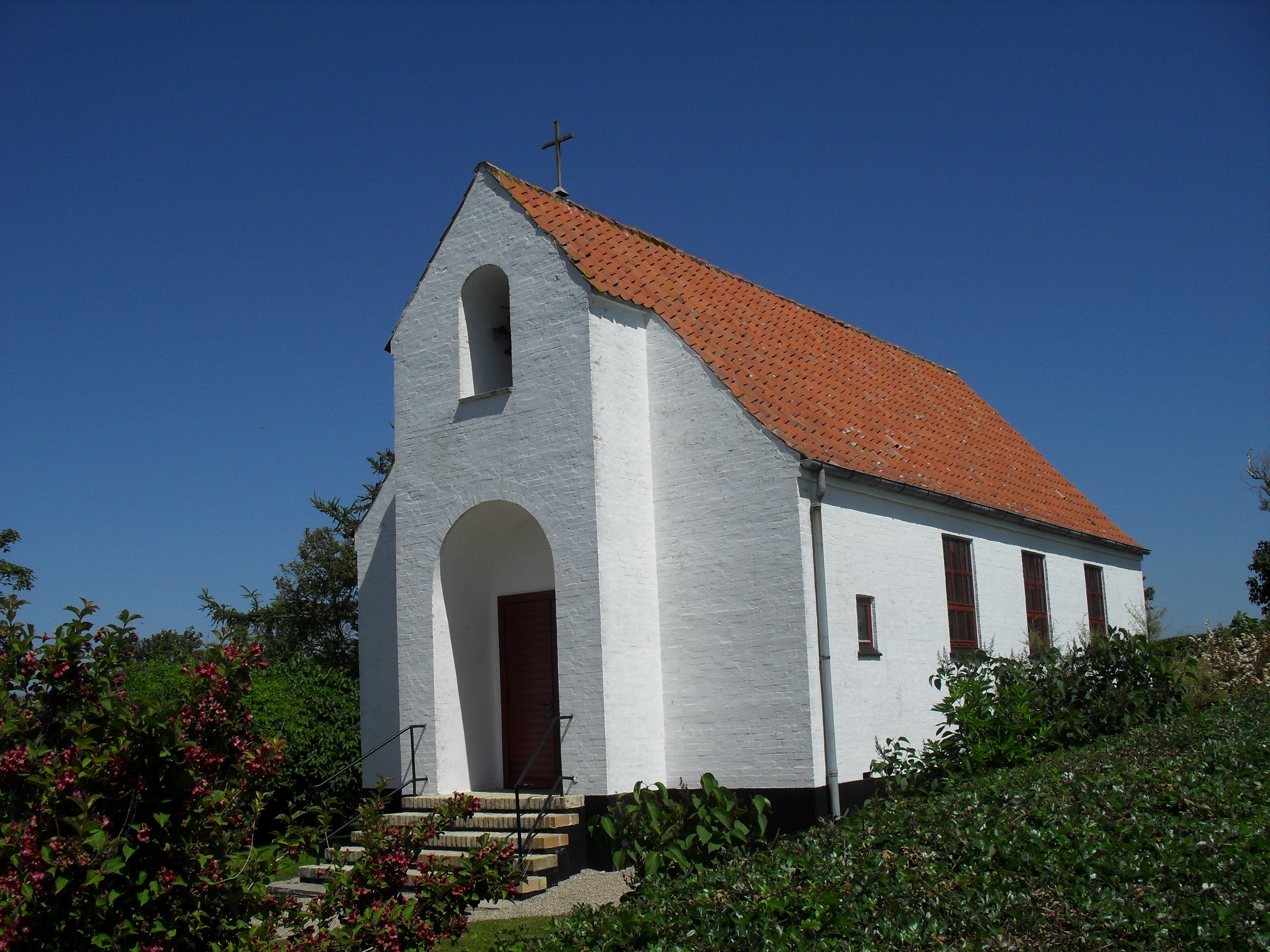
Nekselø Church

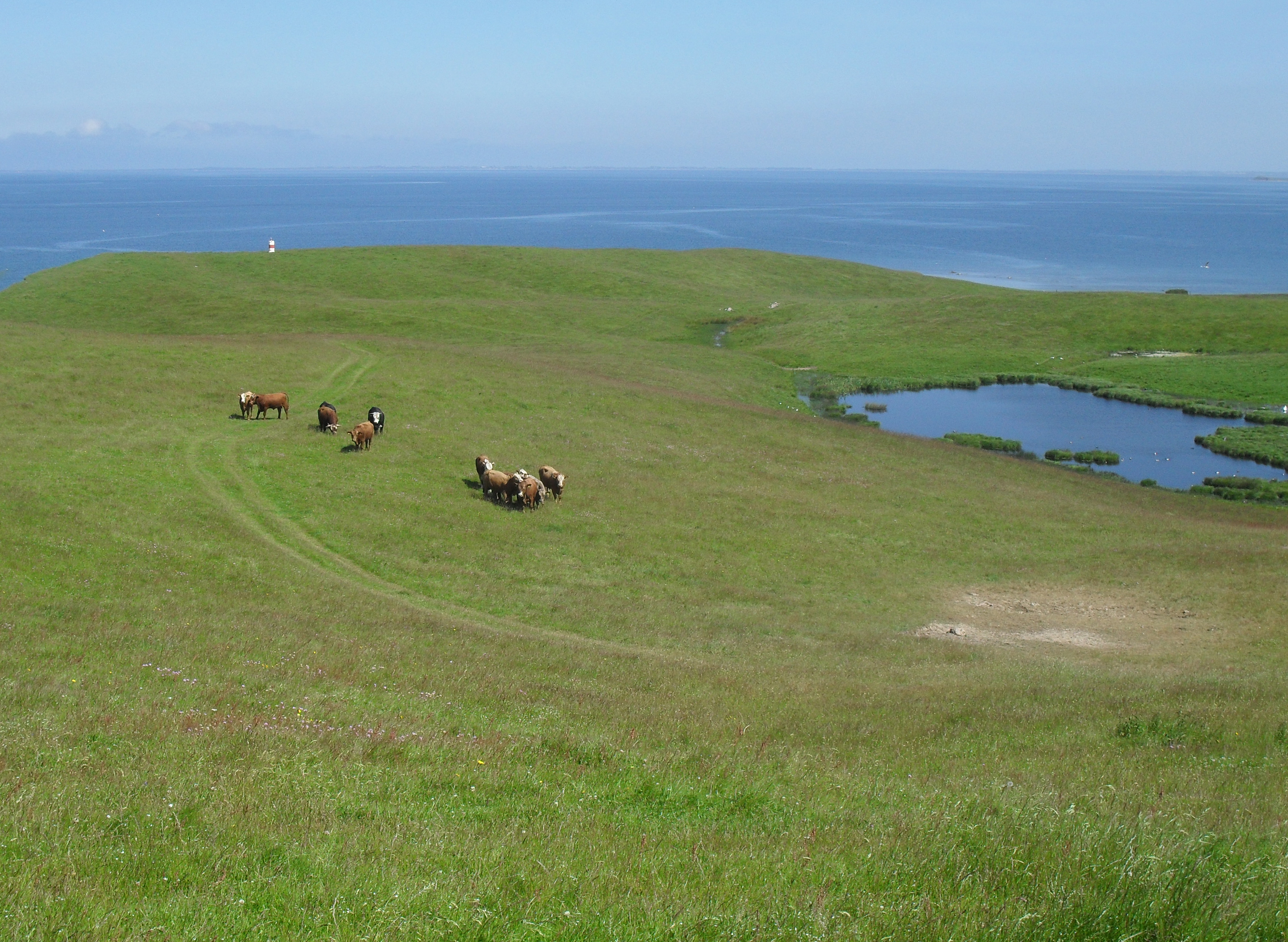
North end of Nekselø

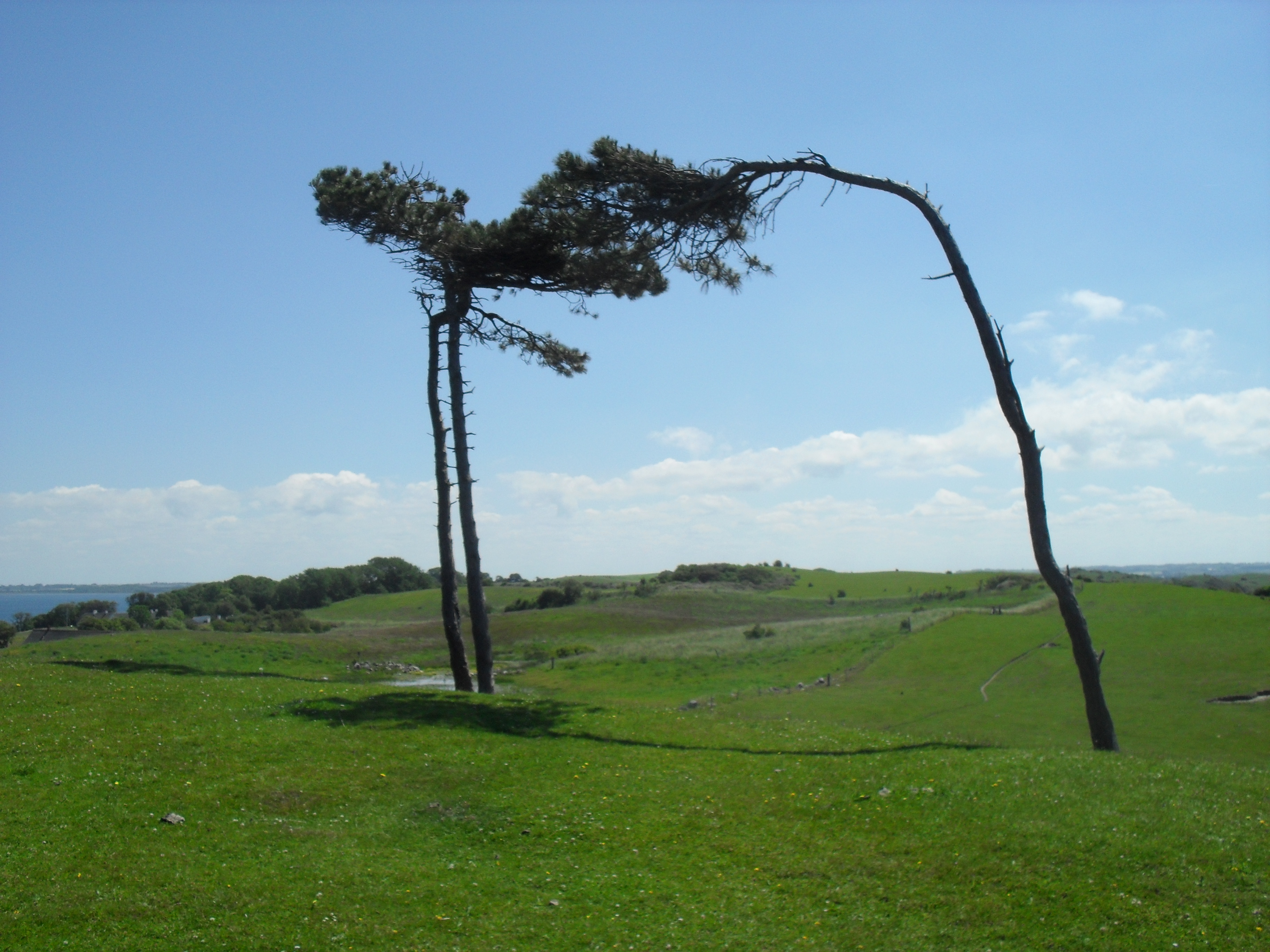
The pines are the landmark of the island

== See also ==
- Sejerø
- List of islands of Denmark
