= Hvidebæk =

Former municipality in Denmark

Coordinates: 55°36′48″N 11°13′50″E

Until 1 January 2007 Hvidebæk was a municipality (Danish, kommune) in West Zealand County on the west coast of the island of Zealand (Sjælland) in Denmark. The municipality covered an area of 98,26 km^{2}, and had a total population of 5,492 (2005). Its last mayor was Henning Fougt, a member of the Venstre (Liberal Party) political party. The main town and the site of its municipal council was the town of Ubby.

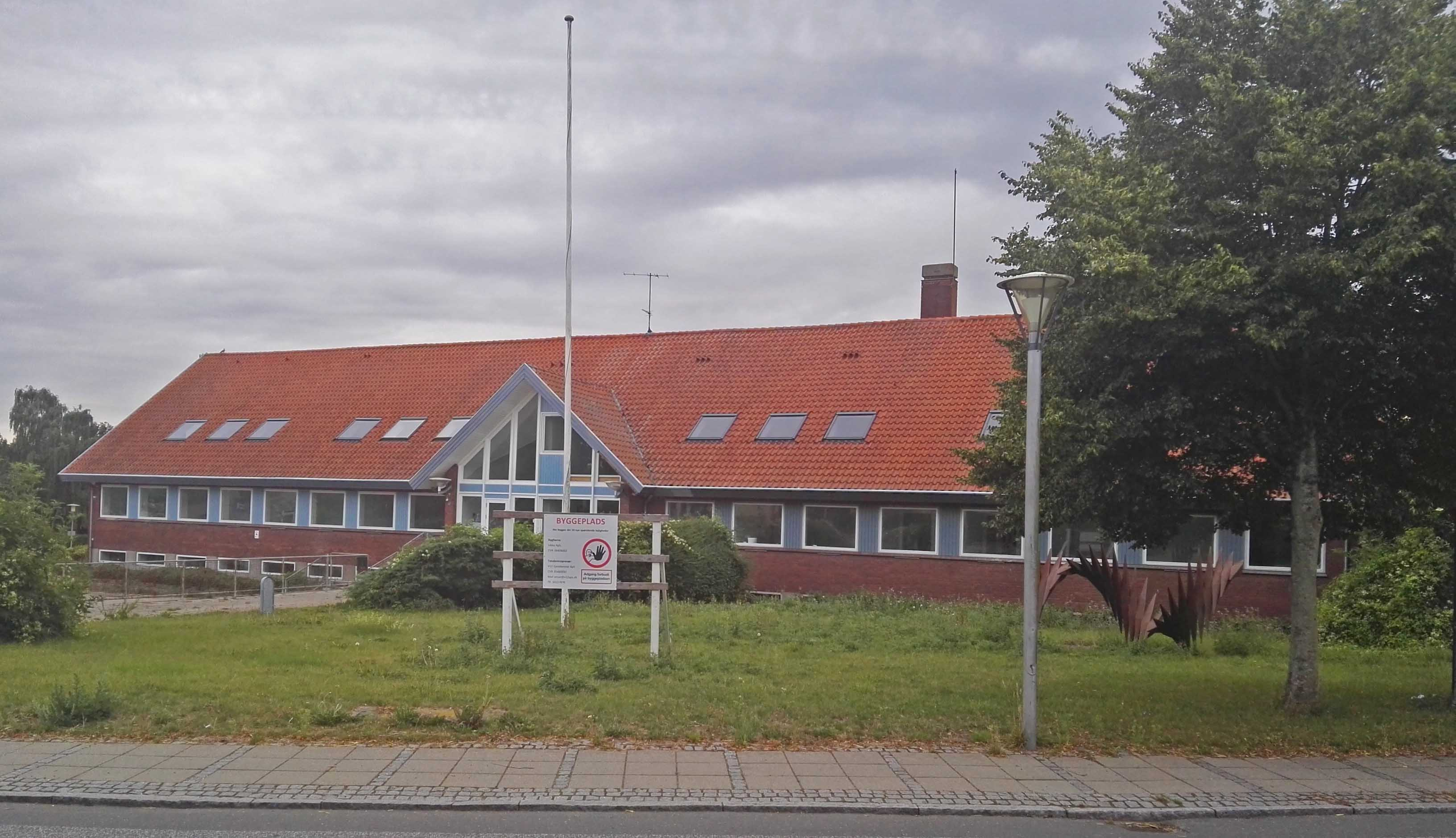
The former townhall of Hvidebæk Municipality in Ubby

Hvidebæk municipality ceased to exist as the result of Kommunalreformen ("The Municipality Reform" of 2007). It was merged with Bjergsted, Gørlev, Høng, and Kalundborg municipalities to form the new Kalundborg municipality. This created a municipality with an area of 598 km^{2} and a total population of 48,697 (2005). The new municipality belongs to Region Sjælland ("Zealand Region").
