= Reersø =

- Town
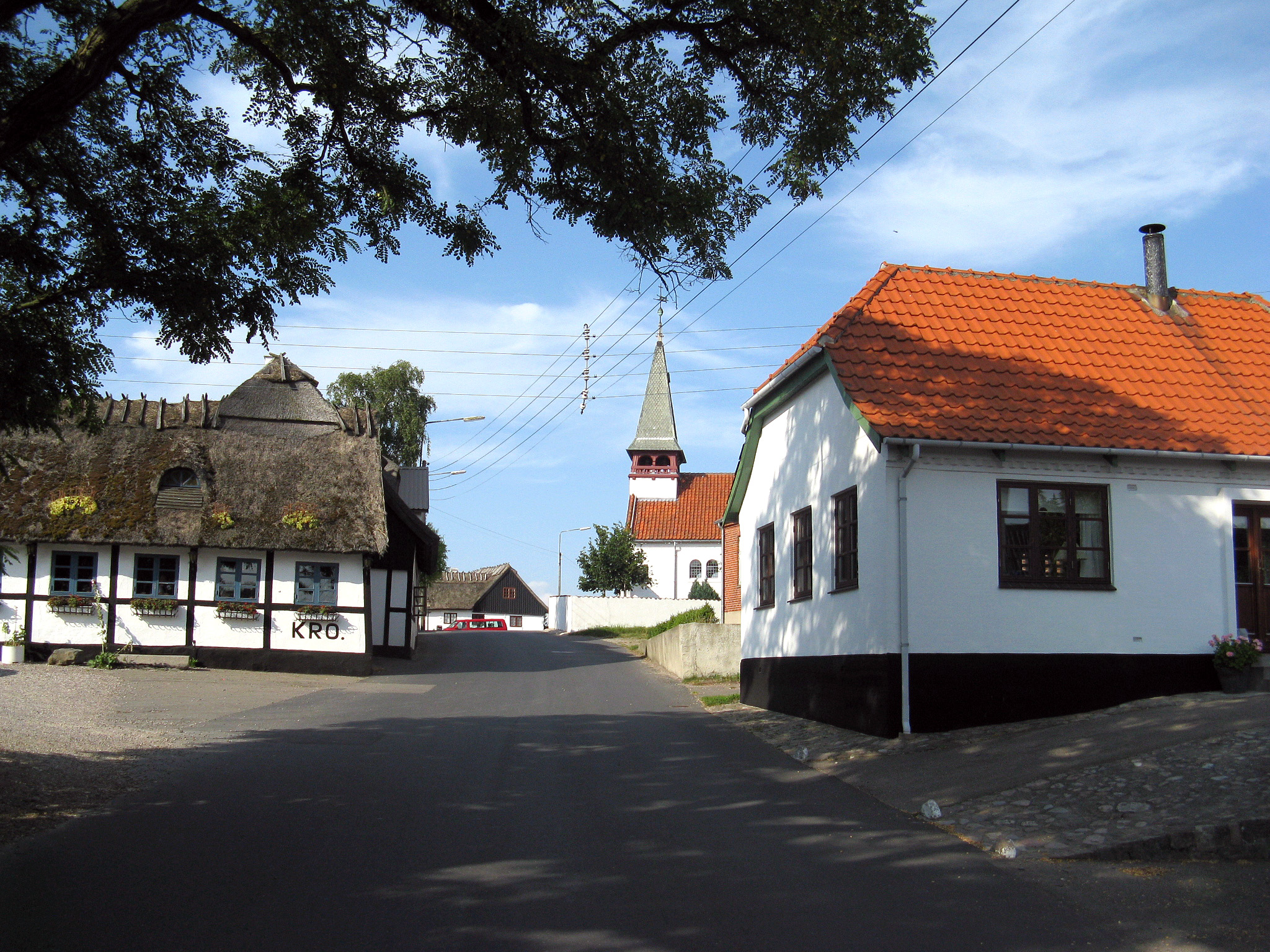
- Reersø inn and church

- Location within Denmark
- Coordinates: 55°31′24″N 11°06′40″E
- Country: Denmark
- Region: Region Zealand
- Municipality: Kalundborg Municipality

Population (2026)
  - Total: 490
- Time zone: UTC+1 (Central European Time)
  - Summer (DST): UTC+2 (Central European Summer Time)

Reersø is a Danish town located on a small peninsula of the same name. It is located in the Great Belt between Korsør and Kalundborg on the western coast of the island of Zealand, and it is part of Kalundborg Municipality in Region Zealand. The town has a population of 490 (2026).

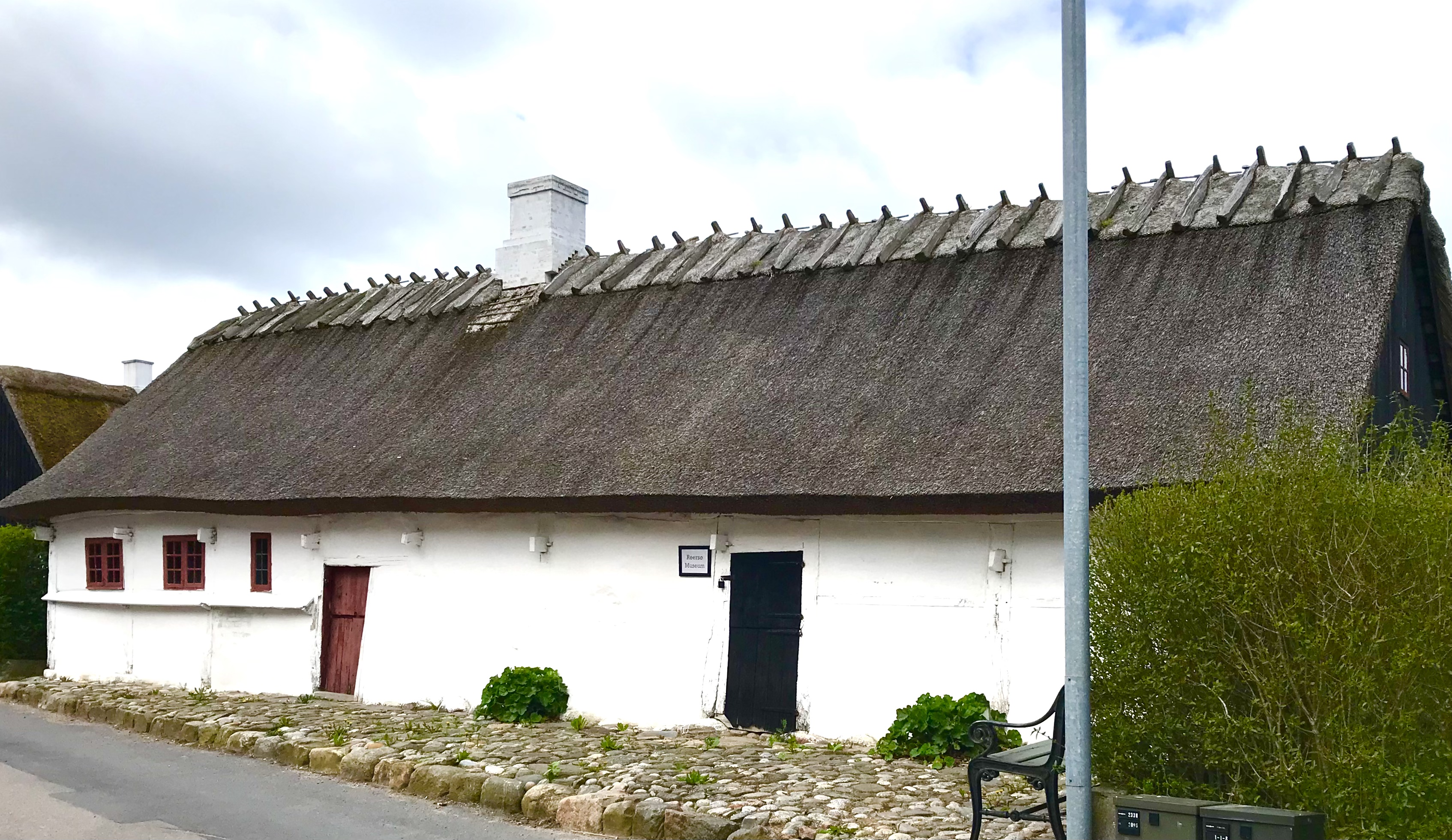
Reersø Museum

Reersø features cliffs on its outer western shore and salt marshes on the neck that cconnect it to the mainland. The area is home to several farms dating to the 16th century. Reersø is a popular tourist destination, and there are several summer houses in the area. Reersø is also home to several artists and has several galleries. Reersø Museum was founded in 1926 by the writer Thorkild Gravlund.

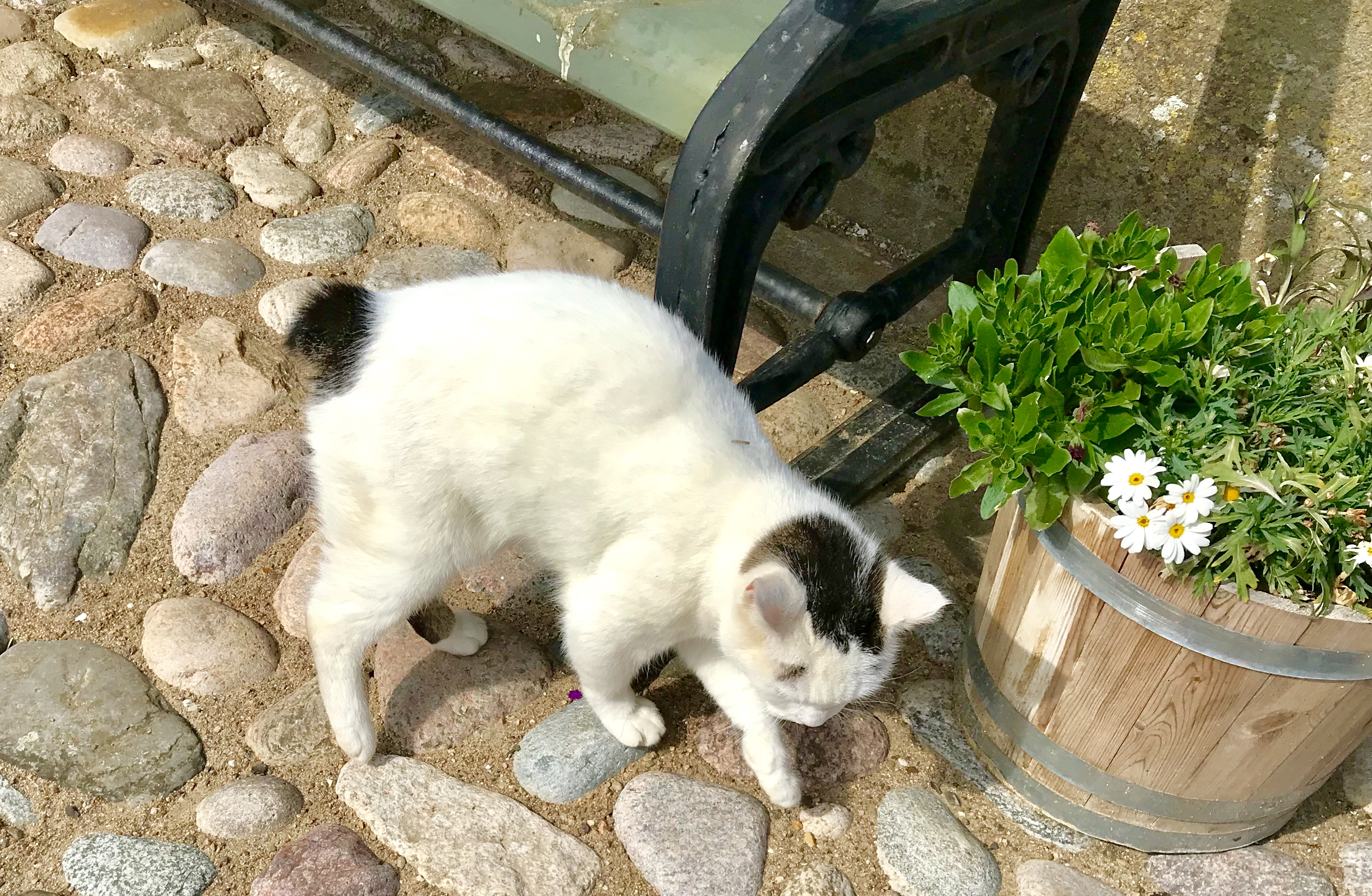
Tailless cat at the Reersø Museum

Reersø is known for its tailless cats.

== Etymology ==
The name Reersø dates back to 1231 with an original spelling of Rethærsø, meaning Rēthar's island.

== Geology ==
The Reersø peninsula was formed by a terminal moraine from the Great Belt Glacier which arrived from the south during the Weichsel glaciation. Reersø was originally an island, but sand eroded from the island's west coast was deposited on the eastern shore, eventually connecting the island to Zealand and forming a sand spit over the mouth of the nearby Halleby River. The west coast has eroded up to the moraine, leaving a shoreline marked by dunes and cliffs.

== Gallery ==
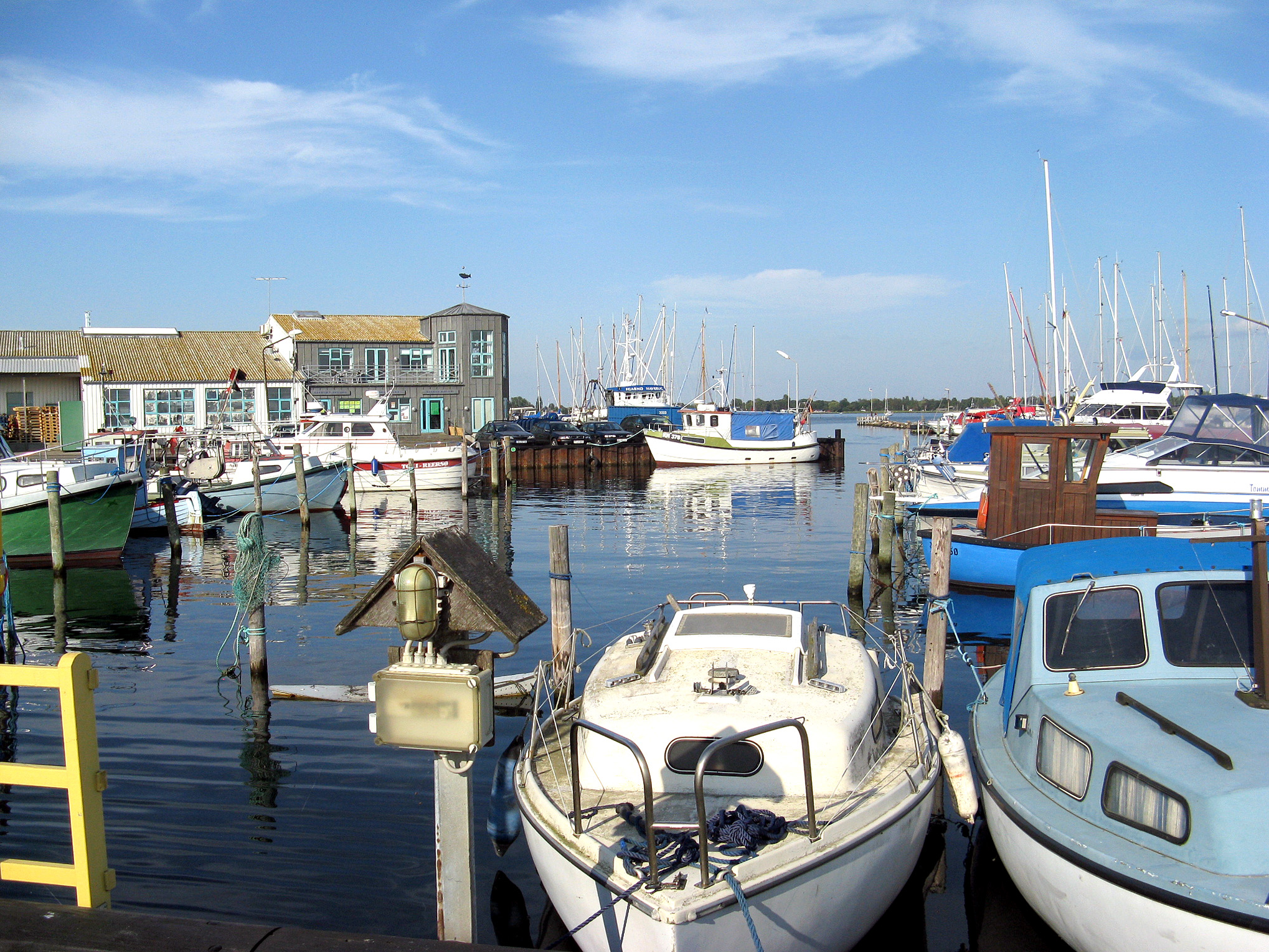
Reersø Harbor
