= Høng =

- Town
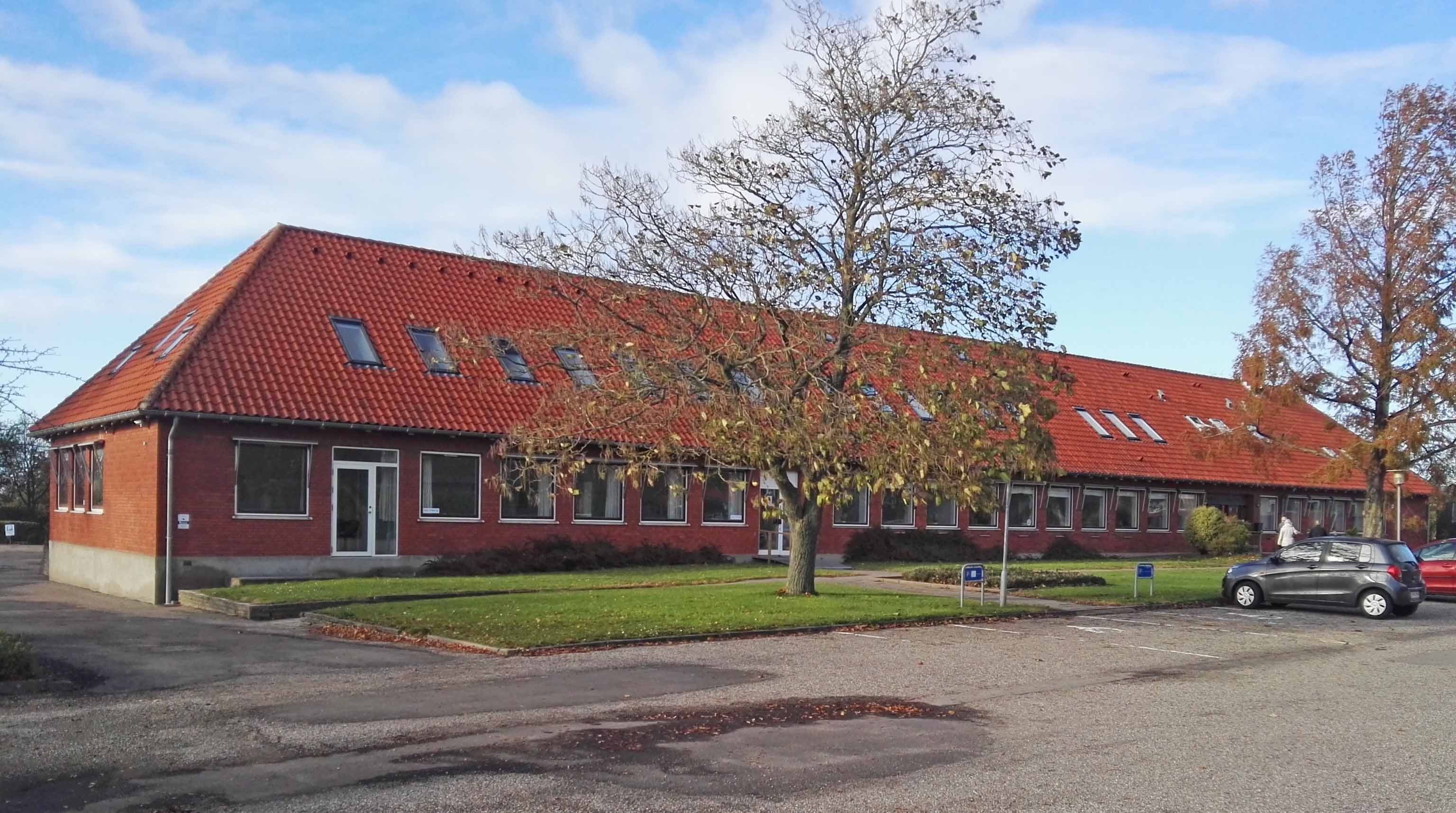
- The old townhall in Høng for the former Høng Municipality

- Location in Denmark Høng (Denmark Region Zealand)
- Coordinates: 55°30′16″N 11°17′31″E
- Country: Denmark
- Region: Region Sjælland
- Municipality: Kalundborg

Area
  - Urban: 3 km^{2} (1.2 sq mi)

Population (2026)
  - Urban: 4,299
  - Urban density: 1,400/km^{2} (3,700/sq mi)
  - Gender: 2,072 males and 2,227 females
- Time zone: UTC+1 (CET)
  - Summer (DST): UTC+2 (CEST)
- Postal code: DK-4270 Høng

Høng is a town with a population of 4,299 (1 January 2026) in Region Sjælland near the west coast of the island of Zealand (Sjælland) in Denmark. It was the municipal seat of the former Høng Municipality.

== Høng Municipality ==
The former Høng Municipality (Danish, Høng Kommune) covered an area of 145 km^{2}, and had a total population of 8,411 (2005). Its last mayor was Ingver Jensen.

On 1 January 2007 Høng Municipality ceased to exist as the result of Kommunalreformen ("The Municipality Reform" of 2007). It was merged with Bjergsted, Gørlev, Hvidebæk, and Kalundborg municipalities to form the new Kalundborg Municipality. This created a municipality with an area of 598 km^{2} and a total population of 48,697 (2005).

== Transport ==
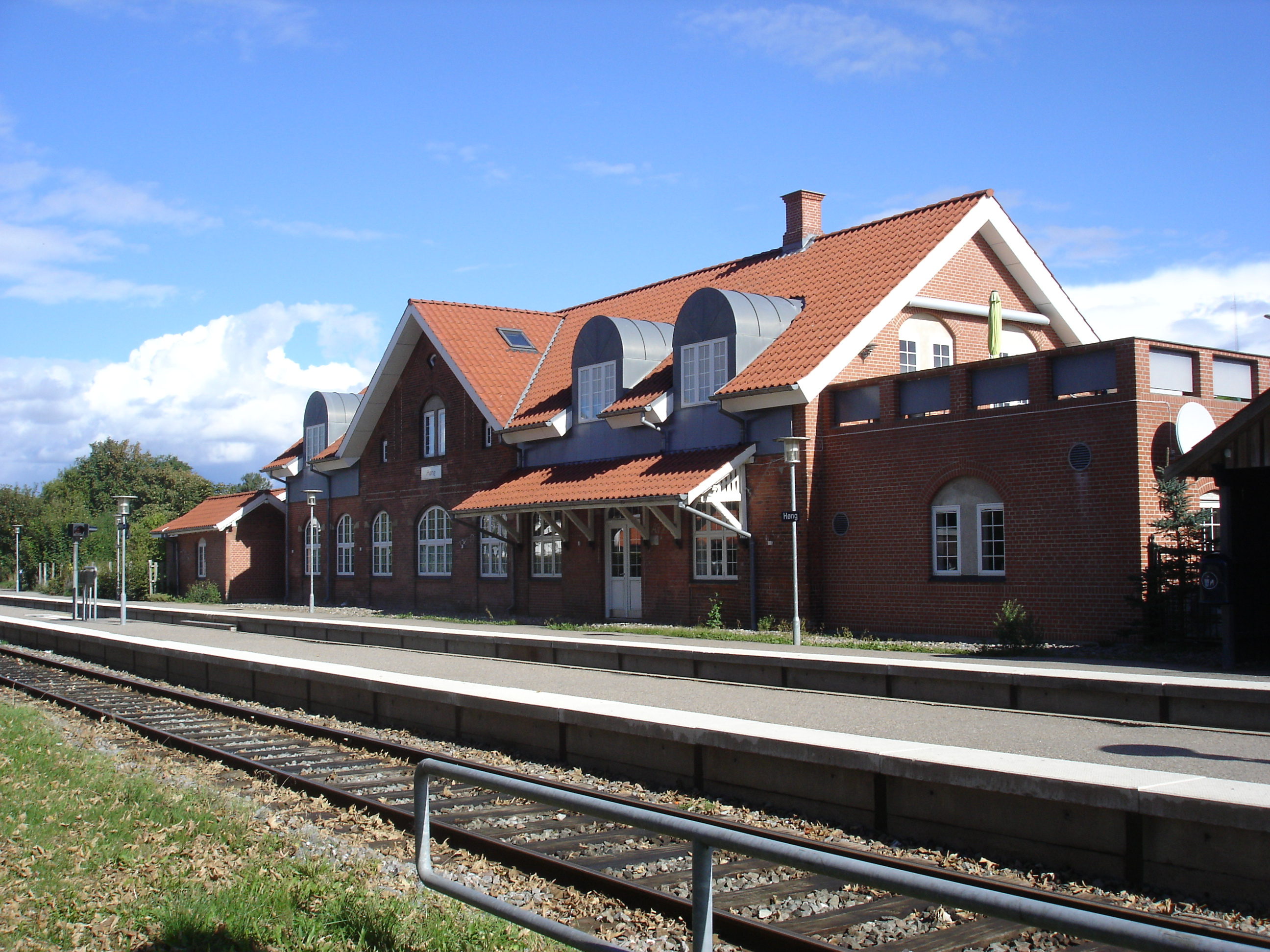
Høng railway station.

Høng is served by Høng railway station. It is located on the Tølløse railway line and offers local train services to Tølløse and Slagelse.

== Notable people ==
- Peter Madsen (born 1971) Danish engineer, entrepreneur and convicted murderer; interested in rockets and submarines. Was brought up in Høng
