= Ubby =

- Town
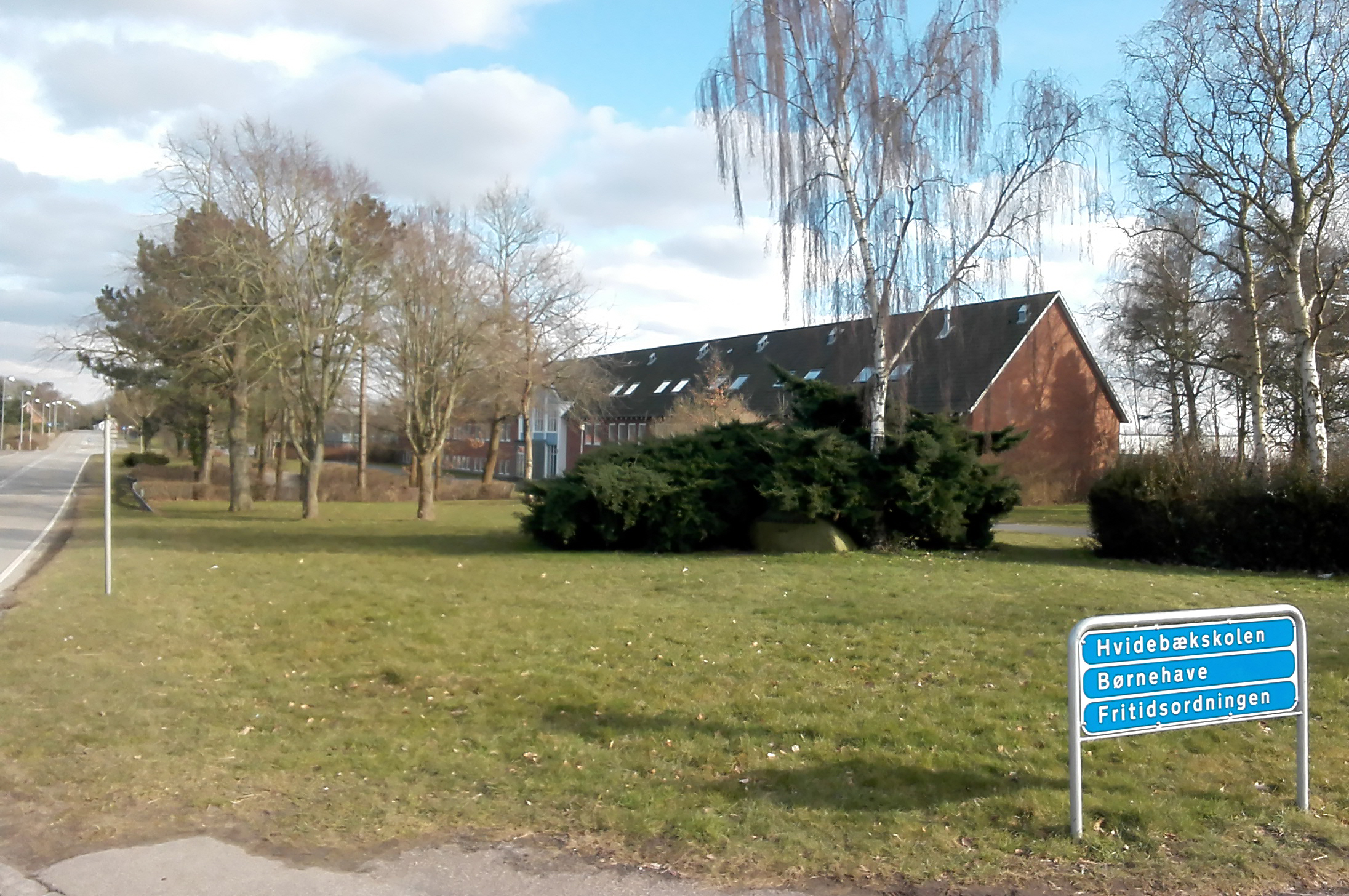
- Hvidebækskolen (The Hvidebæk School) in Jerslev

- Location in Region Zealand Ubby (Denmark)
- Coordinates: 55°37′10″N 11°12′50″E
- Country: Denmark
- Region: Region Zealand
- Municipality: Kalundborg Municipality

Area
  - Urban: 1.6 km^{2} (0.62 sq mi)

Population (2026)
  - Urban: 1,894
  - Urban density: 1,200/km^{2} (3,100/sq mi)
- Time zone: UTC+1 (CET)
  - Summer (DST): UTC+2 (CEST)
- Postal code: DK-4490 Jerslev Sjælland

Ubby is a town with a population of 1,894 (1 January 2026), in Kalundborg Municipality, Region Zealand in Denmark. The town consist of the former villages of Ubby on the western end of the town and Jerslev on the eastern end of the town.

Ubby was the municipal seat of the former Hvidebæk Municipality until 1 January 2007.

The town is located northwest of lake Tissø 11 km southeast of Kalundborg and 12 km north of Gørlev.

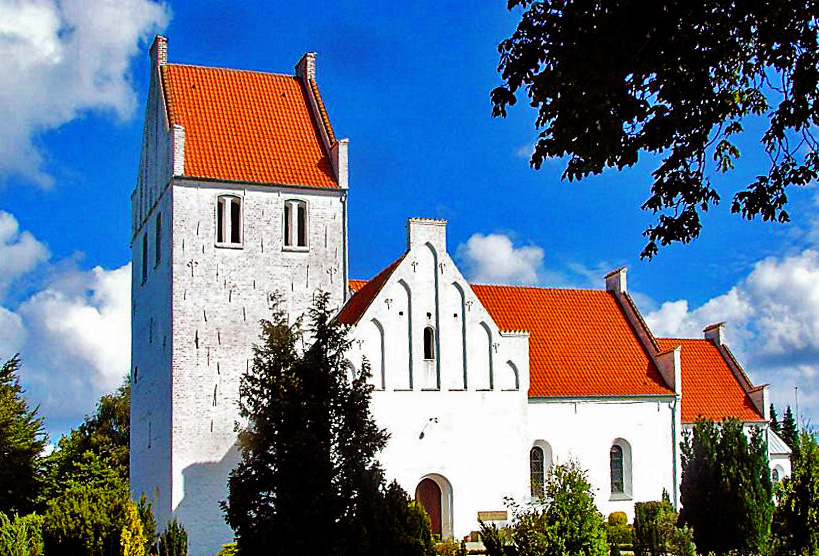
Ubby Church

Ubby Church is located in the town
