= Gørlev =

- Town
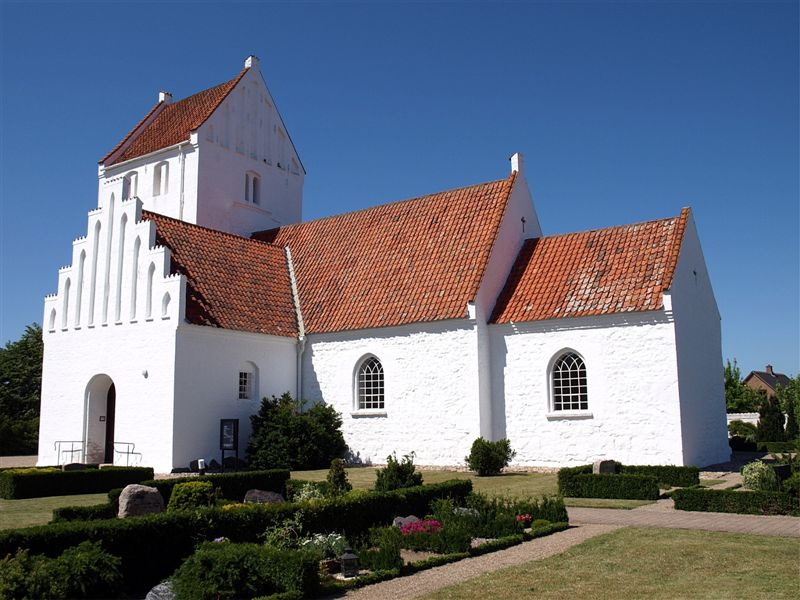
- Gørlev Church

- Location in Denmark Gørlev (Denmark Region Zealand)
- Coordinates: 55°32′24″N 11°13′44″E
- Country: Denmark
- Region: Region Sjælland
- Municipality: Kalundborg

Area
  - Urban: 2.1 km^{2} (0.81 sq mi)

Population (2026)
  - Urban: 2,405
  - Urban density: 1,100/km^{2} (3,000/sq mi)
- Time zone: UTC+1 (CET)
  - Summer (DST): UTC+2 (CEST)
- Postal code: DK-4281 Gørlev

Gørlev is a town on the west coast of the island of Zealand in Denmark. It has a population of 2,405 (1 January 2026) and belongs to Kalundborg Municipality in Region Sjælland. To the west are Musholm Bugt (Musholm Bay), the Storebælt (Great Belt) — the strait separating Zealand and the island of Funen -, and Jammerland Bugt (Jammerland Bay).

== History ==
The countryside around Gørlev - and Kalundborg Municipality in general -, is home to a number of notable prehistoric sites, including Stone Age passage graves and various Bronze Age mounds. The passage grave of Rævehøj (Fox-hill) near the hamlet of Dalby, is known for its rare rock carvings. As many other Stone Age constructions, it was also used throughout the Bronze Age as well.

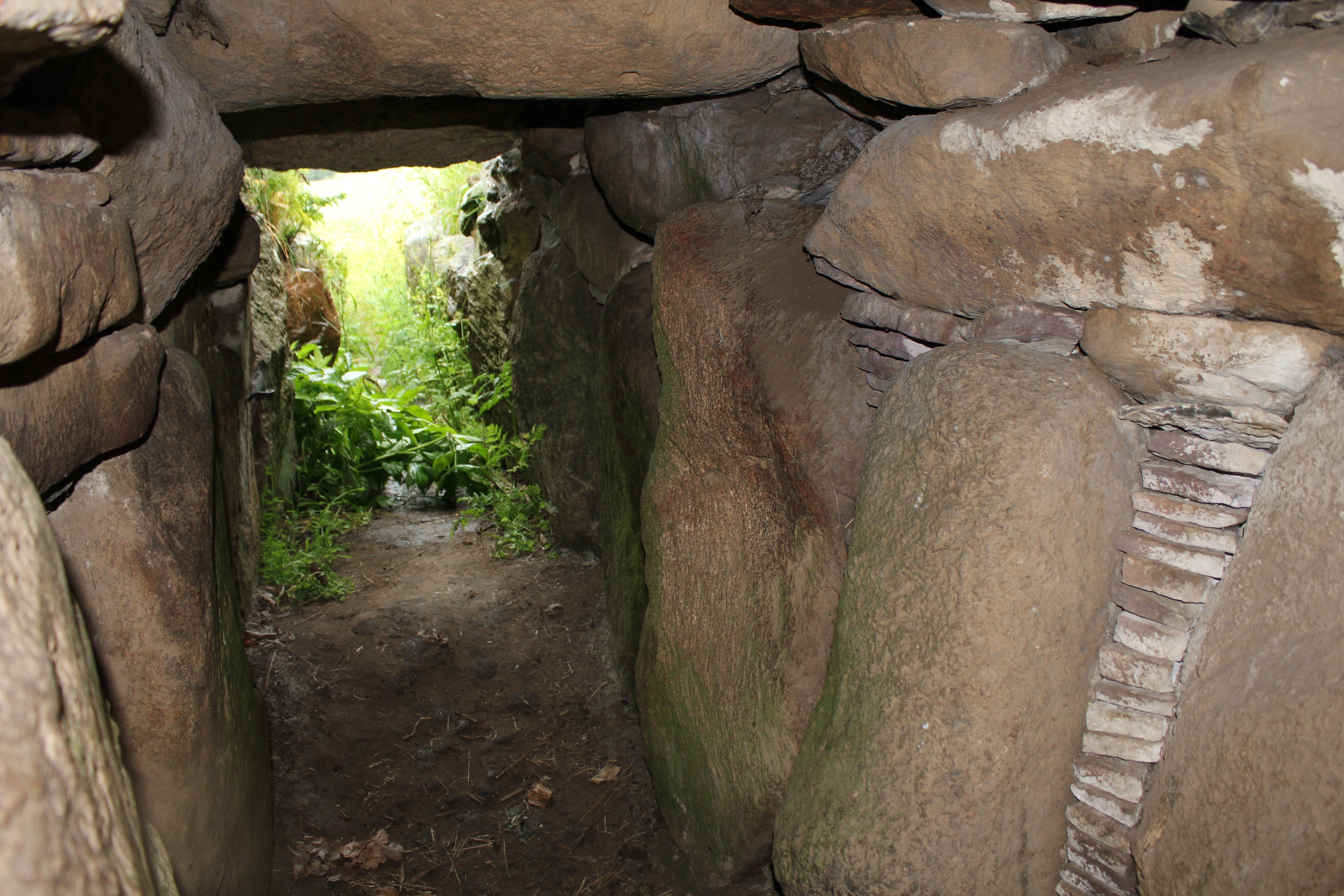
From the Stone Age passage grave of Rævehøj near Gørlev.

In Gørlev Church's entryway are two Viking Age runestones, Gørlevstenene (The Gørlev Stones), showing the entire runic alphabet known as the younger futhark. The first runestone is dated to the early 9th century, and was found on the spot in May 1921 by a bricklayer working at the church. The second runestone is dated to c. 1000, and was found in 1965 under the church tower. The only runestones in Denmark more significant than these are the Jelling stones, erected by King Harold Bluetooth c. 965 in the town of Jelling, the old Viking capital of Denmark.

The nearby marshlands of Maglemose, also known as Mullerup Mose (Mullerup Marsh), is a large wetland area, which includes the lake of Tissø. Here, archaeological evidence of international importance was excavated in the years 1900 and 1902, revealing and defining the Mullerup or Maglemosian Culture that roamed Northern Europe in the Mesolithic Stone Age. They used Maglemose and the surrounding area as a summer camp for hunting and fishing. Maglemose is the oldest site of its type in the Nordic countries, and the findings bettered the understanding of the Nordic Stone Age cultures and Denmark's earliest history in particular. Two memorials commemorate the discovery site.

Other attractions include Svellas Mølle (Svella's Mill), a restored windmill built in 1870 and one of Denmark's smallest mills; the agriculture museum Fløjgården; Reersø Museum; and Den Gamle Biograf (The Old Movie House), the municipality's culture center.

== Gørlev Municipality ==
Until 1 January 2007, Gørlev was also a municipality (Danish: kommune) in West Zealand County. Gørlev Municipality covered an area of 92,06 km^{2}, and had a total population of 6,556 (2005). Its last mayor was Jørgen Arnam-Olsen, a member of the Venstre (Liberal Party) political party.

Gørlev Municipality ceased to exist as the result of Kommunalreformen ("The Municipality Reform" of 2007). It was merged with existing Bjergsted, Hvidebæk, Høng, and Kalundborg municipalities to form the new Kalundborg Municipality. This created a municipality with an area of 598 km^{2} and a total population of 48,697 (2005).

== Notable people ==
- Heino Hansen (born 1947 in Gørlev) a Danish former professional footballer who played 31 games for Denmark

== Sources ==
- Municipal statistics: NetBorger Kommunefakta, delivered from KMD a.k.a. Kommunedata (Municipal Data)
- Municipal mergers and neighbors: Eniro new municipalities map
