= Sejerø =

Danish island in the Kattegat sea, north-west of Zealand

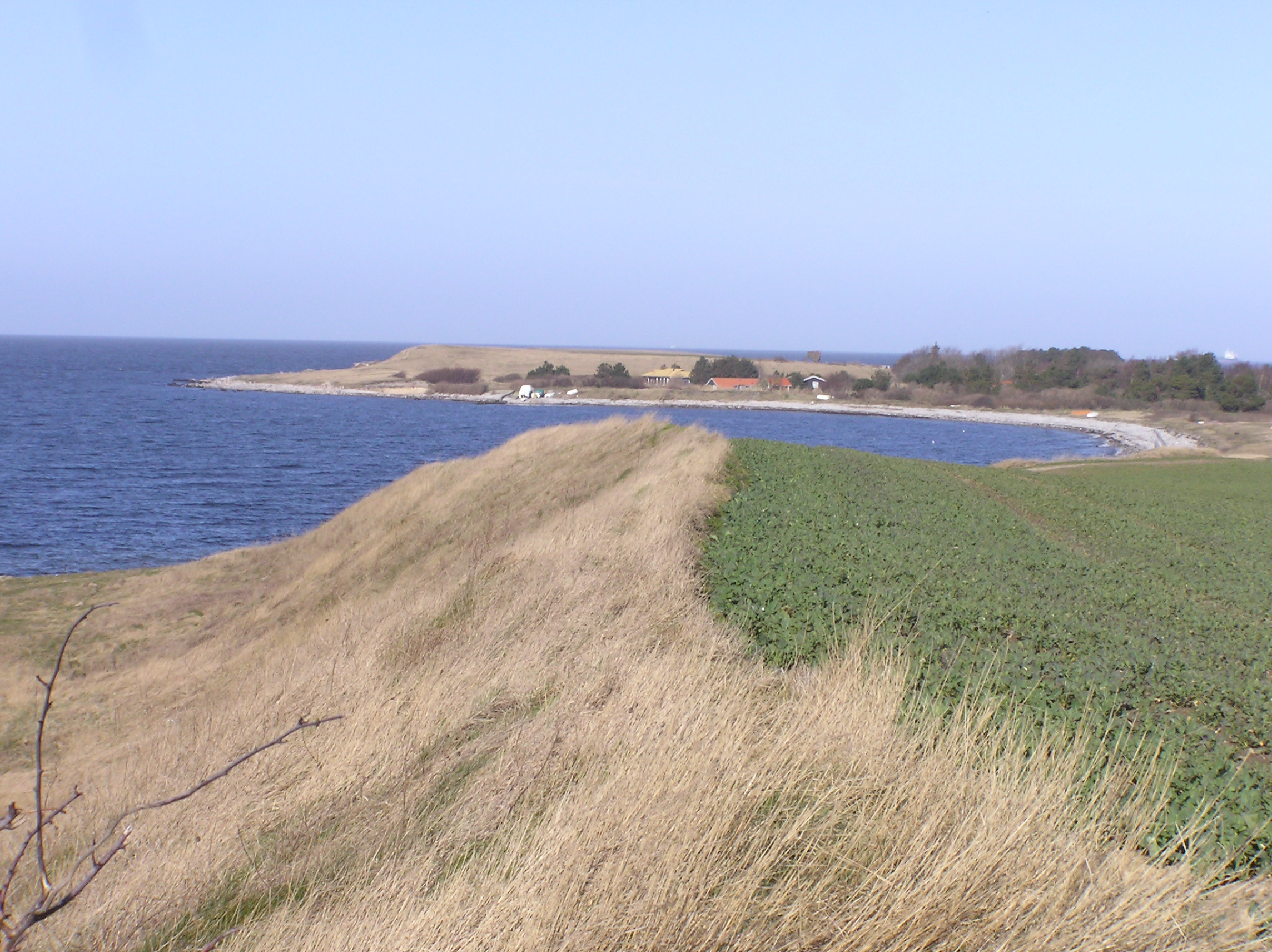
- Typical coastline at Sejerø.

- Sejerø island west of Zealand in the Bay of Sejerø.

Geography
- Coordinates: 55°53′0″N 11°9′0″E
- Area: 12.36 km^{2} (4.77 sq mi)

Administration
- Denmark
- Municipality: Kalundborg Municipality

Demographics
- Population: 301 (2025)
- Pop. density: 24.35/km^{2} (63.07/sq mi)

Additional information
- Time zone: CET (UTC+1)
  - Summer (DST): CEST (UTC+2)
- Postal code: 4592

Sejerø is a Danish island in the Kattegat sea, north-west of Zealand. Sejerø with its 301 inhabitants is part of Kalundborg Municipality and covers an area of 12.36 square kilometres (4.77 square miles). The largest village on Sejerø is Sejerby, housing half of the island's population.

South-east of Sejerø is the smaller island of Nekselø, also in the Bay of Sejerø.

== See also ==
Nearby islands:

- Nekselø
- Samsø
- Zealand

== Sources ==
- Tageo.com, "VESTSJAELLAND DENMARK Geography Population" (coordinates), 2007, webpage: Tageo-Sejero.
- Denmark Postal codes, webpage: Postnumre-DK.
- Tele.dk Denmark detailed road map, webpage: Tele-DK-Danmark.
