= Kalundborg Municipality =

Kalundborg Municipality Kalundborg Kommune (Danish)
- Municipality
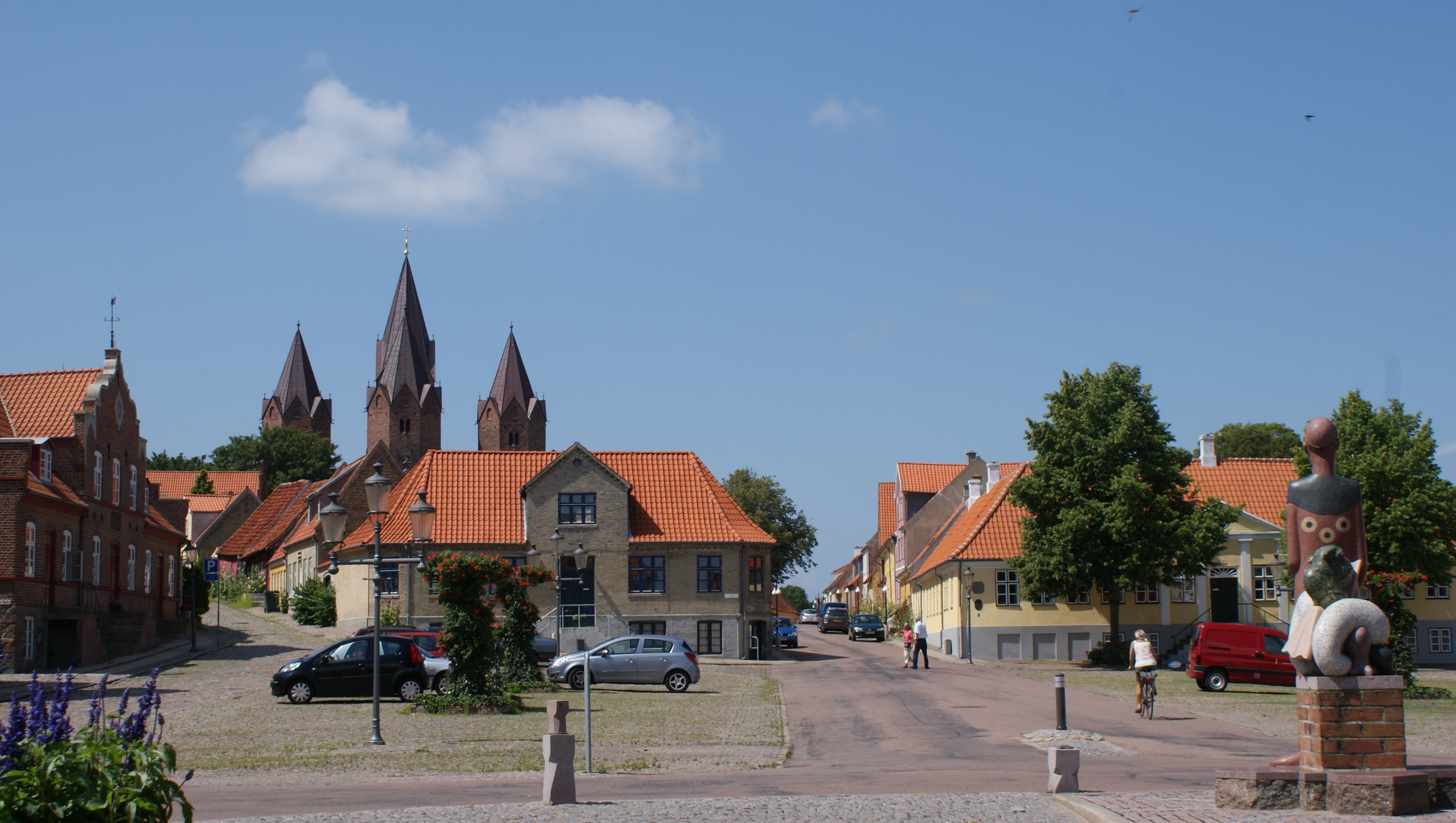

- Coat of arms

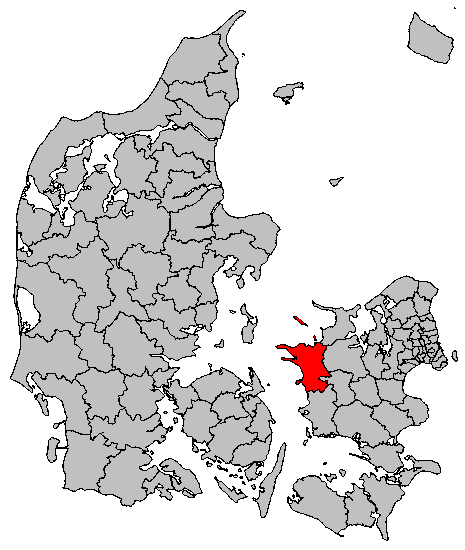
- Coordinates: 55°40′50″N 11°05′53″E
- Country: Denmark
- Region: Zealand
- Established: 1 January 2007
- Seat: Kalundborg

Government
  - Mayor: Martin Damm (V)

Area
  - Total: 604 km^{2} (233 sq mi)

Population (1 January 2026)
  - Total: 47,954
  - Density: 79.4/km^{2} (206/sq mi)
- Time zone: UTC+1 (CET)
  - Summer (DST): UTC+2 (CEST)
- Postal code: 4400
- Municipal code: 326
- Website: www.kalundborg.dk

Kalundborg Municipality (Danish: Kalundborg Kommune) is a kommune in the Region Sjælland on the west coast of the island of Zealand in Denmark. The municipality covers an area of 604 km^{2} (233 mi^{2}), and has a total population of 47,954 (1 January 2026). Its mayor is Martin Damm, a member of Venstre. The main town and the site of its municipal council is the city of Kalundborg.

The municipality is surrounded by water on three sides:

- Samsø Bælt— the strait which separates the municipality from the island of Samsø— and Sejerø Bay (Sejerø Bugt) — the bay in which the island of Sejerø is located) to the north
- The Great Belt (Storebælt)— the strait which separates Zealand from the island of Funen) and the Kattegat to the west
- Jammerland Bay (Jammerland Bugt) to the south.

The municipalities of Samsø to the northwest, and Juelsminde on the Jutland peninsula to the west are thus also Kalundborg's municipal neighbors, albeit separated by water.

Ferry lines connect the municipality to Aarhus on the Jutland peninsula, and to the island of Samsø at the central harbour in Kalundborg. The harbour is conveniently located near the Kalundborg train station, which connects to the cities of Holbæk and Copenhagen. A large industrial zone, including a South Harbour, is located south of the town's central area.

On 1 January 2007 Kalundborg municipality was, as the result of Kommunalreformen ("The Municipal Reform" of 2007), merged with existing Gørlev, Hvidebæk, Bjergsted, and Høng municipalities to form the new Kalundborg municipality.

== Urban areas ==
The ten largest urban areas in the municipality are:

#	Locality	Population
1	Kalundborg	16,268
2	Høng	4,357
3	Gørlev	2,482
4	Svebølle	2,201
5	Ubby	1,943
6	Havnsø	988
7	Snertinge	967
8	Rørby	783
9	Spangsbro	783
10	Kirke Helsinge	560

== Politics ==
Kalundborg's municipal council consists of 27 members, elected every four years.

=== Municipal council ===
Below are the municipal councils elected since the Municipal Reform of 2007.

Election	Party									Total seats	Turnout	Elected mayor
Election	A	B	C	F	J	L	O	V	Ø	Total seats	Turnout	Elected mayor
2005	7	1	1	8	1	1	2	10		31	69.0%	Tommy Dinesen (F)
2009	8	1	1	5		1	4	11		31	64.8%	Martin Damm (V)
2013	6	2		1			5	11	2	27	71.2%	Martin Damm (V)
2017	8	1		1			5	11	1	27	69.9%	Martin Damm (V)
Data from Kmdvalg.dk 2005, 2009, 2013 and 2017

== Attractions ==
The tip of Røsnæs peninsula is the westernmost point on the island of Zealand. On the northern side of the peninsula is the Skanse Forest (Skanseskoven) which has a rich birdlife. During the spring and autumn it is visited by many migrating birds.

Stately Lerchenborg Castle, the traditional seat of the aristocratic Lerche family, is located on the forest-covered Asnæs peninsula. It is one of the finest examples of baroque architecture in Denmark. The home and gardens are open to the public, but is closed during 2005 for restoration. A number of special arrangements take place at the castle during the year, including a Christmas market, music concerts and car shows. The castle was built in 1747 by General Lerche-Lerchenborg. In the southern side wing is a room dedicated to Hans Christian Andersen who was guest in 1862.

The municipality also encompasses a large body of water near its northern coast— Saltbæk Cove (Saltbæk Vig), which is one of the largest lakes in West Zealand and a bird reservation. Nearby to the south is a public beach.

Our Lady Church (Vor Frue Kirke), erected ca. 1170, is located in the center of Kalundborg city's old quarter called Højbyen ("The High City"). It is a beautiful and unique, five-spired church which is believed to have been built by Esbern Snare. It is closely associated with King Valdemar I and the famous Archbishop Absalon. The city center has cobblestone streets, narrow streets, and well-preserved half-timbered houses from the Middle Ages.

== Image gallery ==
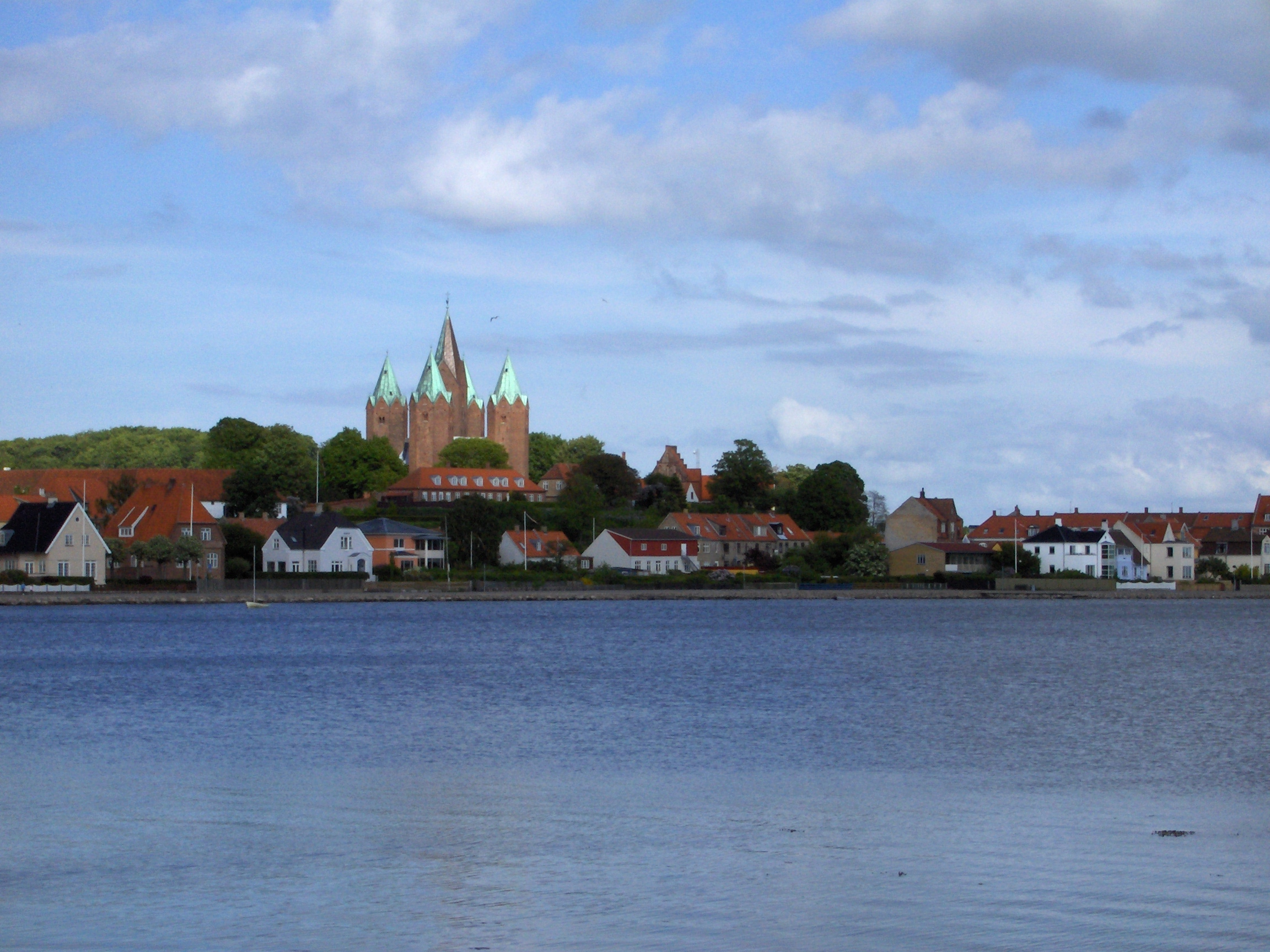
Kalundborg seen from the sea

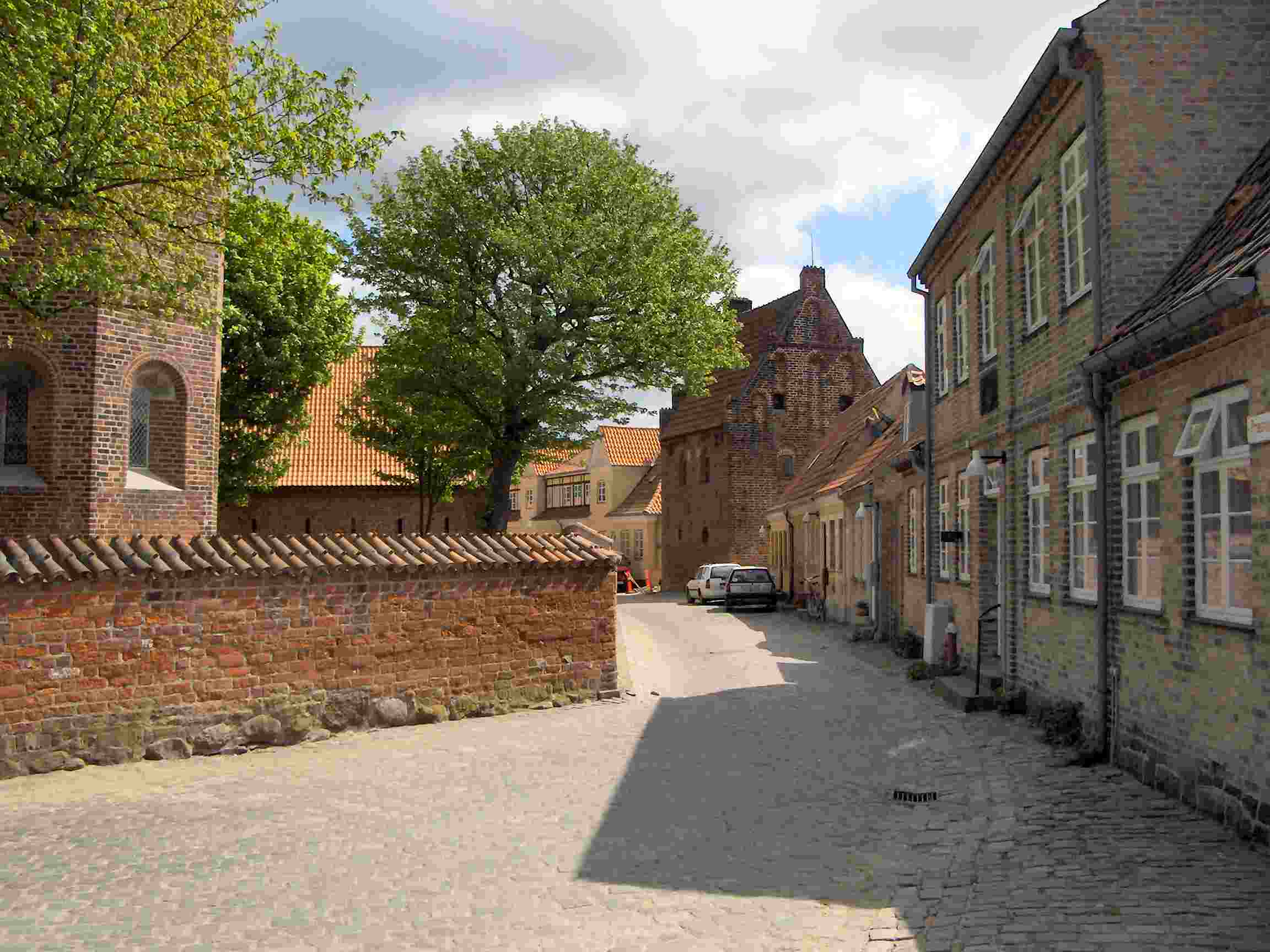
A street in Kalundborg

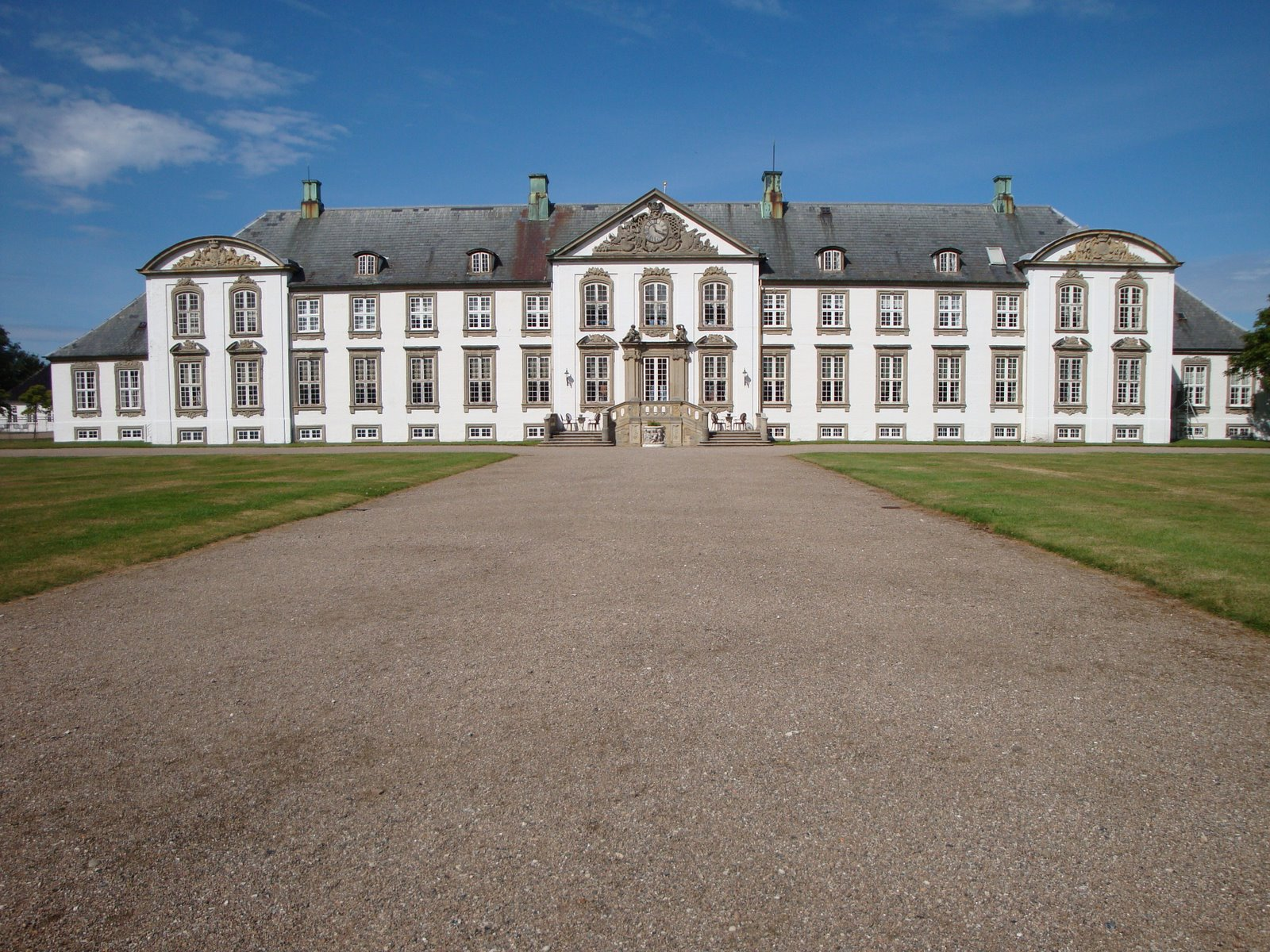
Lerchenborg

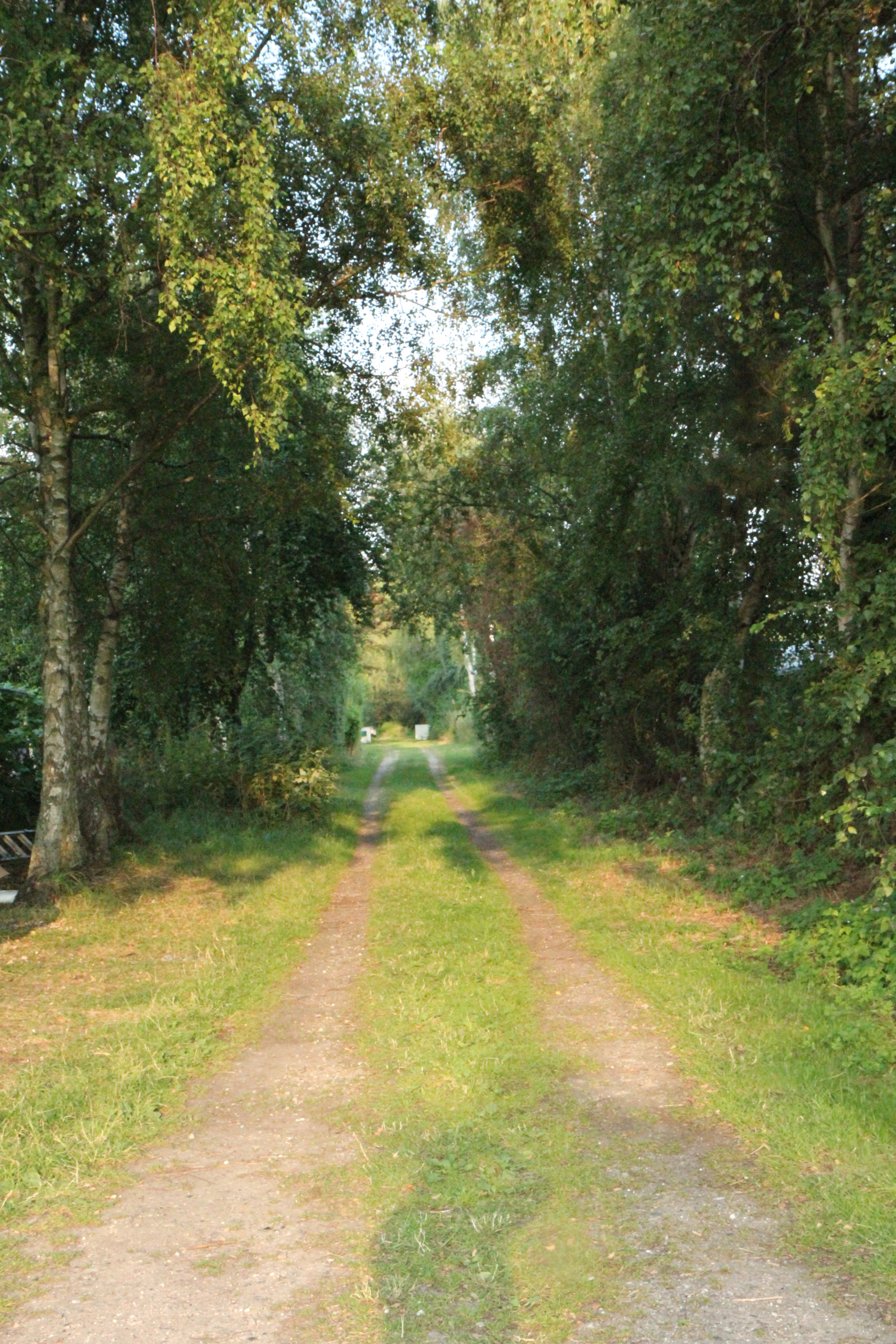
A path at Bjerre Beach near Gørlev
