= Knabstrup railway station =

Railway station in Northwest Zealand, Denmark

Knabstrup
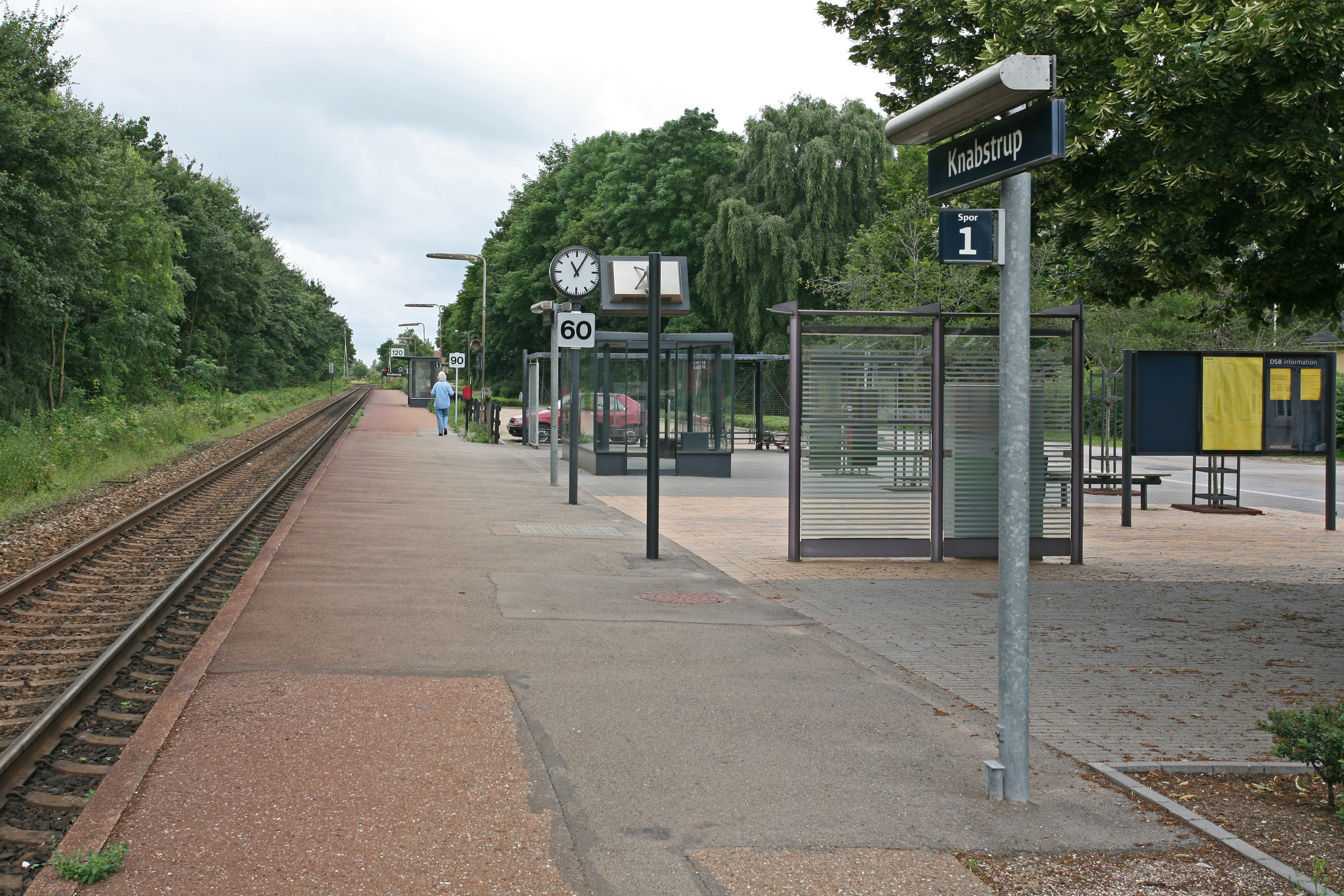
- Knabstrup station in 2007

General information
- Location: Stationsvej 1 Knabstrup, 4440 Mørkøv; Holbæk Municipality; Denmark
- Coordinates: 55°39′53.59″N 11°33′12.63″E
- Elevation: 18.3 metres (60 ft)
- Owner: DSB (station infrastructure); Banedanmark (rail infrastructure)
- Line: Northwest Line
- Platforms: 1 side platform
- Tracks: 1
- Train operators: DSB

Construction
- Architect: Adolf Ahrens

Other information
- Station code: Ks
- Website: Official website

History
- Opened: April 1, 1876; 150 years ago

Services
Preceding station	DSB	Following station
Regstrup towards Østerport	Copenhagen–Kalundborg Regional train	Mørkøv towards Kalundborg
Location

Knabstrup railway station is a railway station serving the small railway town of Knabstrup between the cities of Holbæk and Kalundborg on the island of Zealand, Denmark. The station is located in the centre of the town near its main artery Holbækgade. Knabstrup Manor, where the horse breed Knabstrupper was bred, is located two kilometres (1.2 mi) southeast of the station.

Knabstrup railway station is situated on the Northwest Line from Roskilde to Kalundborg. The station opened in 1876. It offers regional rail services to Kalundborg, Holbæk, Roskilde and Copenhagen operated by the national railway company DSB.

== History ==
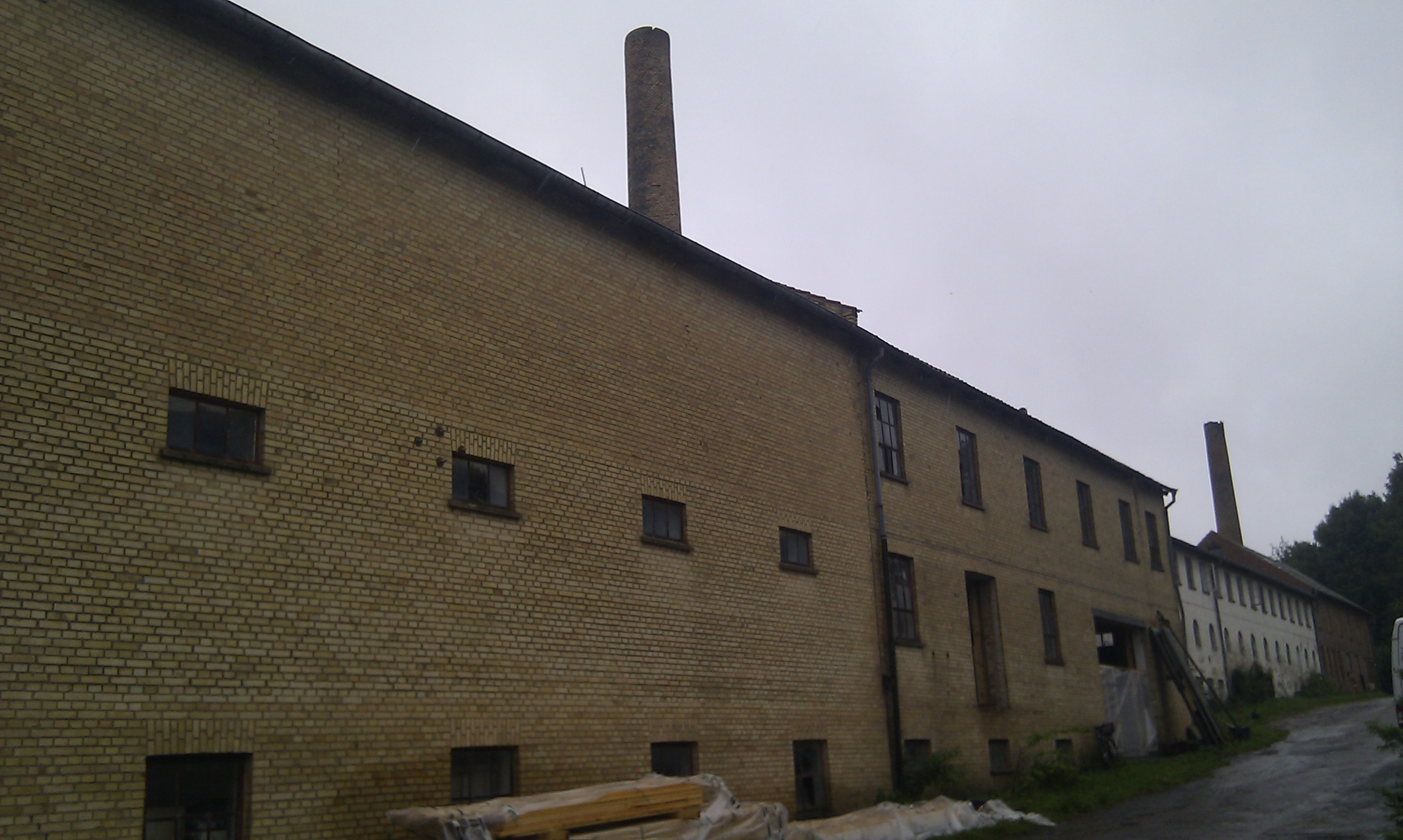
Knabstrup Brickworks photographed in 2011.

Knabstrup station was not one of the original stations on the Northwest Line between Roskilde and Kalundborg which opened on 30 December 1874. Instead, the owner of the nearby Knabstrup Manor financed the establishment of a stop with a shot industrial track to the estate's brickworks, which opened on 1 April 1876. Subsequently, a station town developed around the station, where some of the factory workers of the brickworks lived.

In 1892, the Danish State Railways took over the station, and in 1893 Knabstrup became a real station which served passengers, luggage and freight.

== Architecture ==
Knabstrup station's station building was built to designs by the Danish railway architect Adolf Ahrens (1826–1895). The station building was torn down in 1975.

== Services ==
The station offers frequent regional rail services to Kalundborg, Holbæk, Roskilde and Copenhagen operated by the national railway company DSB.

== See also ==
- List of railway stations in Denmark
- Rail transport in Denmark
- History of rail transport in Denmark
- Transport in Denmark
