= Carl Adolph Castenschiold =

Danish Royal official

Carl Adolph Castenschiold (1740 – 30 July 1820) was a Danish landowner and royal official. He owned the Knabstrup Manor and Hagestedgaard estates, and was the brother of Joachim Castenschiold.

== Early life ==
Castenschiold was born on St. Thomas in the Danish West Indies, the son of plantation owner Johan Lorentz Carstens and Jacobe von Holten. The family moved to Copenhagen around the time of his birth. They lived in Store Kirkestræde. His father purchased Knabstrup and was ennobled under the name Castenschiold in 1745.

== Property and titles ==
He inherited Knabstrup Manor in 1760 but sold the estate in 1764. He purchased Hagestedgaard in 1769. He was appointed to etatsråd in 1777 and chamberlain in 1780.

== Personal life ==
He married Dorothea Augusta Brøer (1744 – 14 June 1819) on 5 May 1760 at Hagestedgård. The couple had 10 children but several of them died as infants. He married, for a second time, Dorothea Lyngbye (1761 – 9 July 1838) on 14 June 1820.
