= Philip Lang =

Philip Lang may refer to:

- Philip J. Lang (1911–1986), American musical arranger, orchestrator and composer of band music
- Phil Lang (Philip David Lang, born 1929), American politician in the Oregon House of Representatives

== See also ==
- Philip Lange (1756-1805), Danish architect and master mason
