= Philip Lange =

Danish architect and master mason

Frantz Philip Nicolai Lange (31 March 1756 – 28 March 1805) was a Danish architect and master mason. He made a significant contribution to the rebuilding of Copenhagen in the years after the Copenhagen Fire of 1795. Most of his buildings have been listed on the Danish registry of protected buildings and places.

== Early life and education ==
Lange was born on 31 March 1756 in Copenhagen, the son of architect and master mason Philip de Lange and Anna Lucia Ehlers. He was just 1½ years old when his father died but may have been articled to his 14 years older brother Ferdinand Lange.

== Career ==
Lange was granted citizenship in 1785 as a master mason in Copenhagen. He was appointed as director of Kjøbenhavns Brandforsikring (Copenhagen Fire Insurance) in 1795. Large parts of the city were destroyed the same year in the Copenhagen Fire of 1795. Lange was responsible for overseeing the tent camp on Nørre Fælled. He made a significant contribution to the reconstruction of the city. Many of his buildings were constructed in collaboration with Lauritz Trane.

== Personal life ==
He married Kirstine Pihl (27 October 1762 – 17 March 1837) in 1783. She was the daughter of ship captain Christian Pihl and Kirstine Nielsdatter Holm.

== Selected work ==
- Headmaster's House, Herlufsholm, Næstved (1794–1795)
- 46 temporary dwellings, Toldbodgade/Sankt Annæ Plads, Copenhagen (1795, demolished)
- Nikolajgade 12/Laksegade 31 (1797)
- Laksegade 20/Dybensgade 11 (1798)
- Gammeltorv 4 (1798, demolished)
- Dorthealyst at Knabstrup Manor, Nørre Jernløse Sogn, Holbæk County (1799–1802, listed)
- Kronprinsessegade Barracks, Kronprinsessegade 46, Copenhagen (1803, listed)

=== With Lauritz Thrane ===
- Naboløs 2/Kompagnistræde 1 (1797)
- Skindergade 49 (1797)
- Kattesundet 2/Vestergade 15 (1797–1798)
- Larsbjørnsstræde 6 and 8 (1797–1798)
- Sankt Peders Stræde 37 (1798)
- Admiralgade 13/Laksegade 37 (1798)
- Hyskenstræde 2/Vimmelskaftet 35 (1798)
- Sankt Peders Stræde 39 (1798)
- Boldhusgade 1/Admiralgade 28 (1798–1799)
- Sankt Peders Stræde 37 (1798–1799)
- Laksegade 12/Asylgade 10 (1799)
- Mikkel Bryggers Gade 10/Lavendelstræde 14 (1803)

== Gallery ==
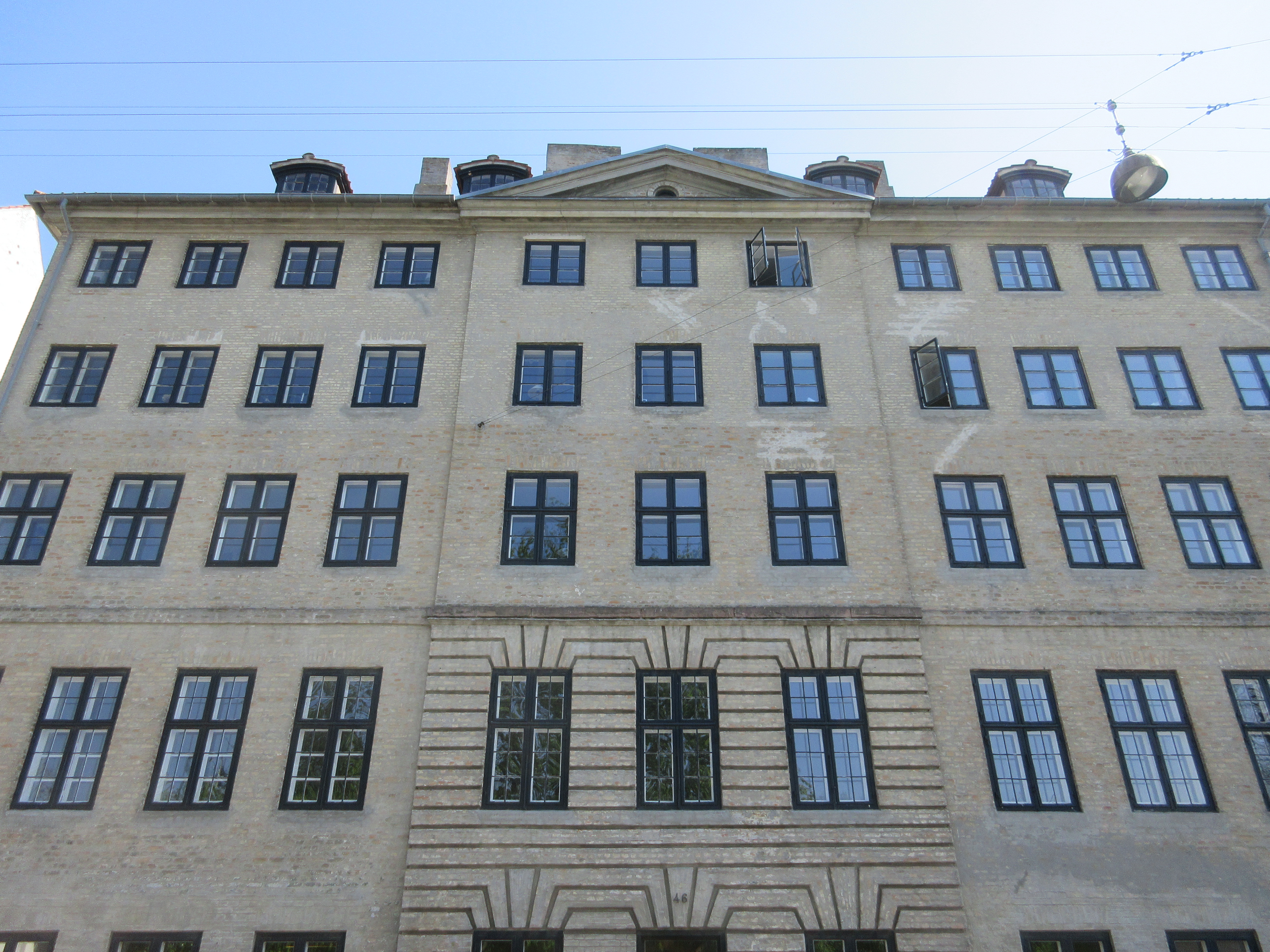
Kronprinsessegade Barracks, Copenhagen

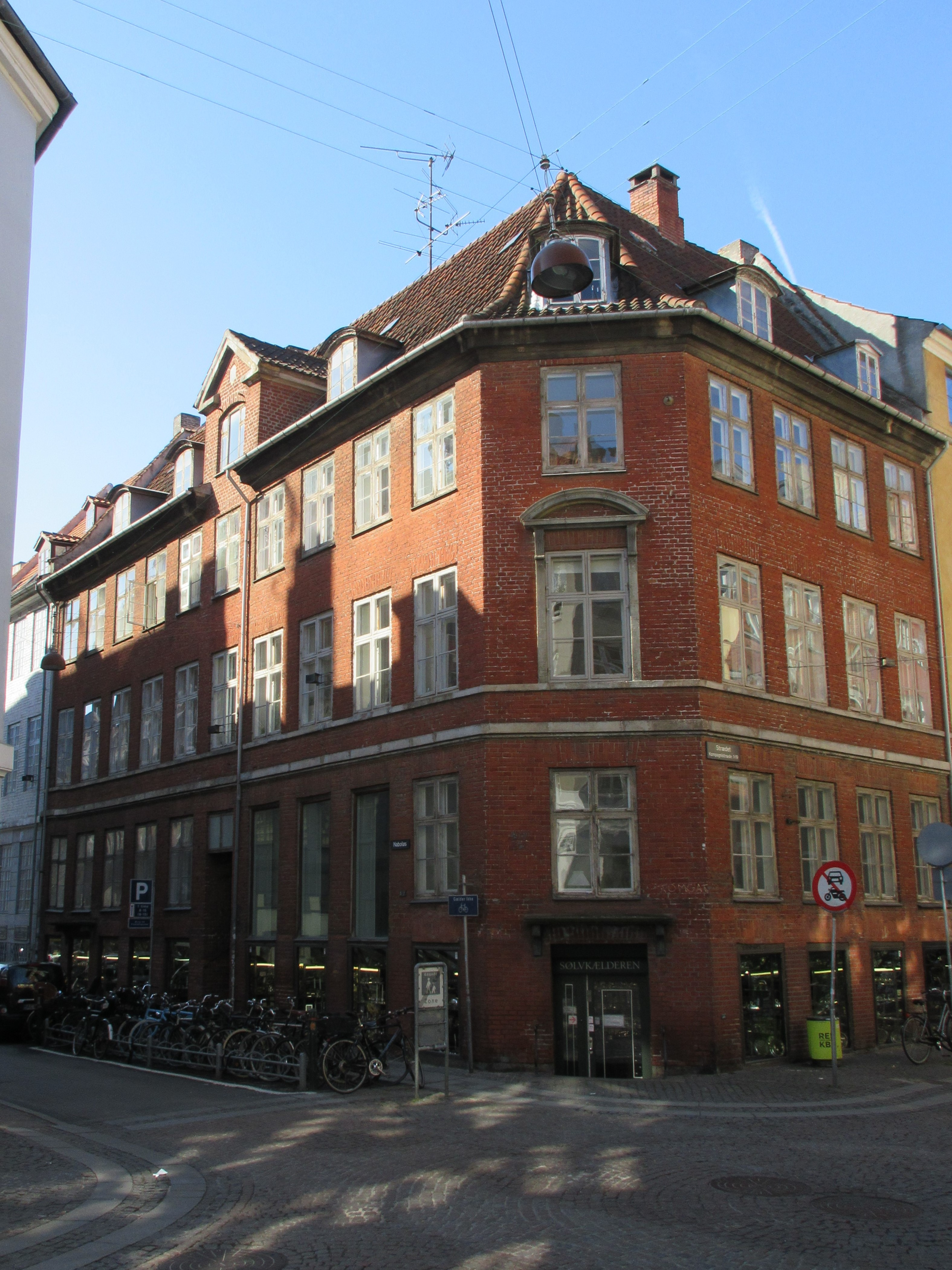
Naboløs 2, Copenhagen

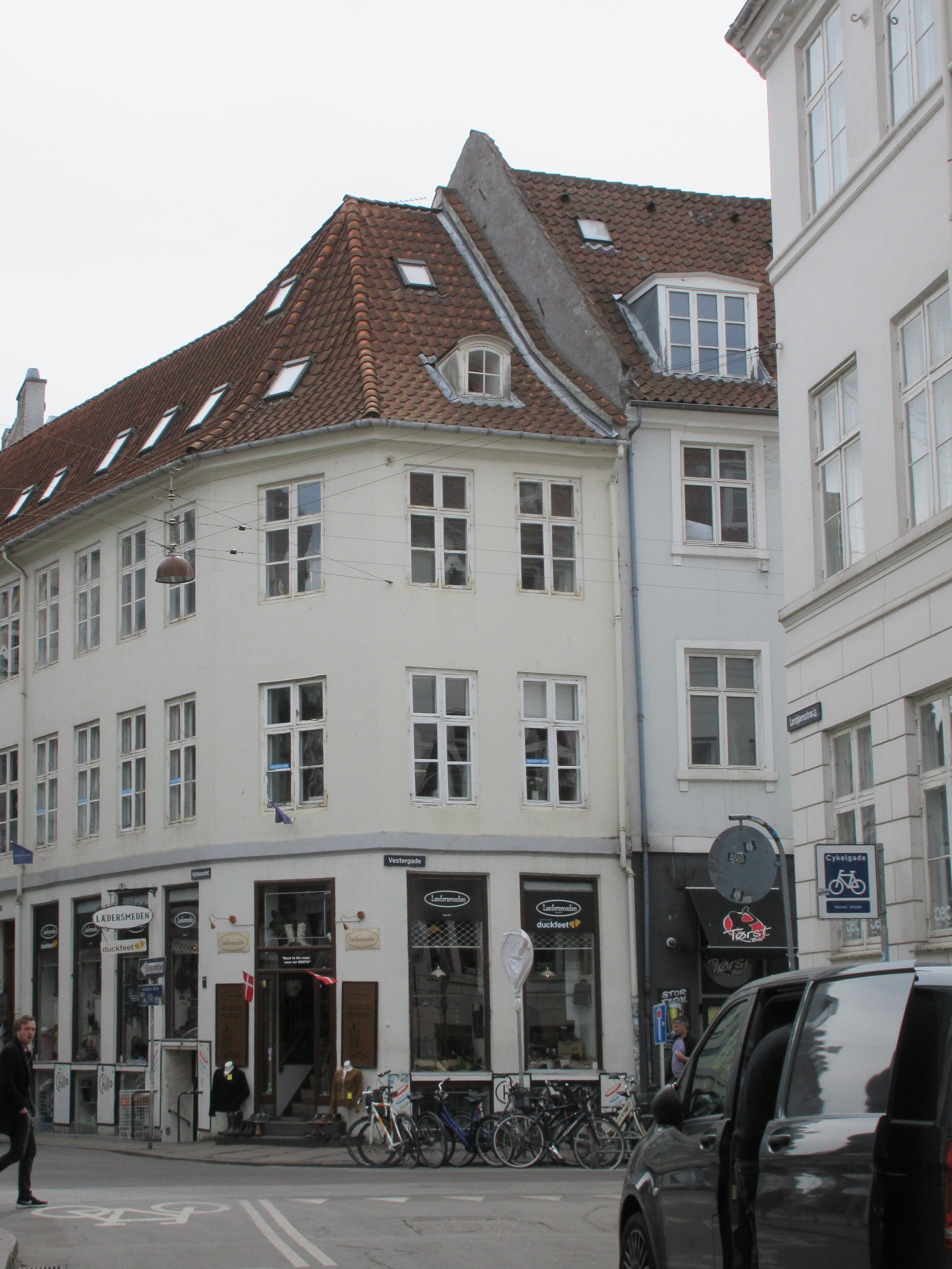
Kattesundet 2 (Vestergade 15, Copenhagen)
