= Knabstrup =

Town in Denmark

- Town
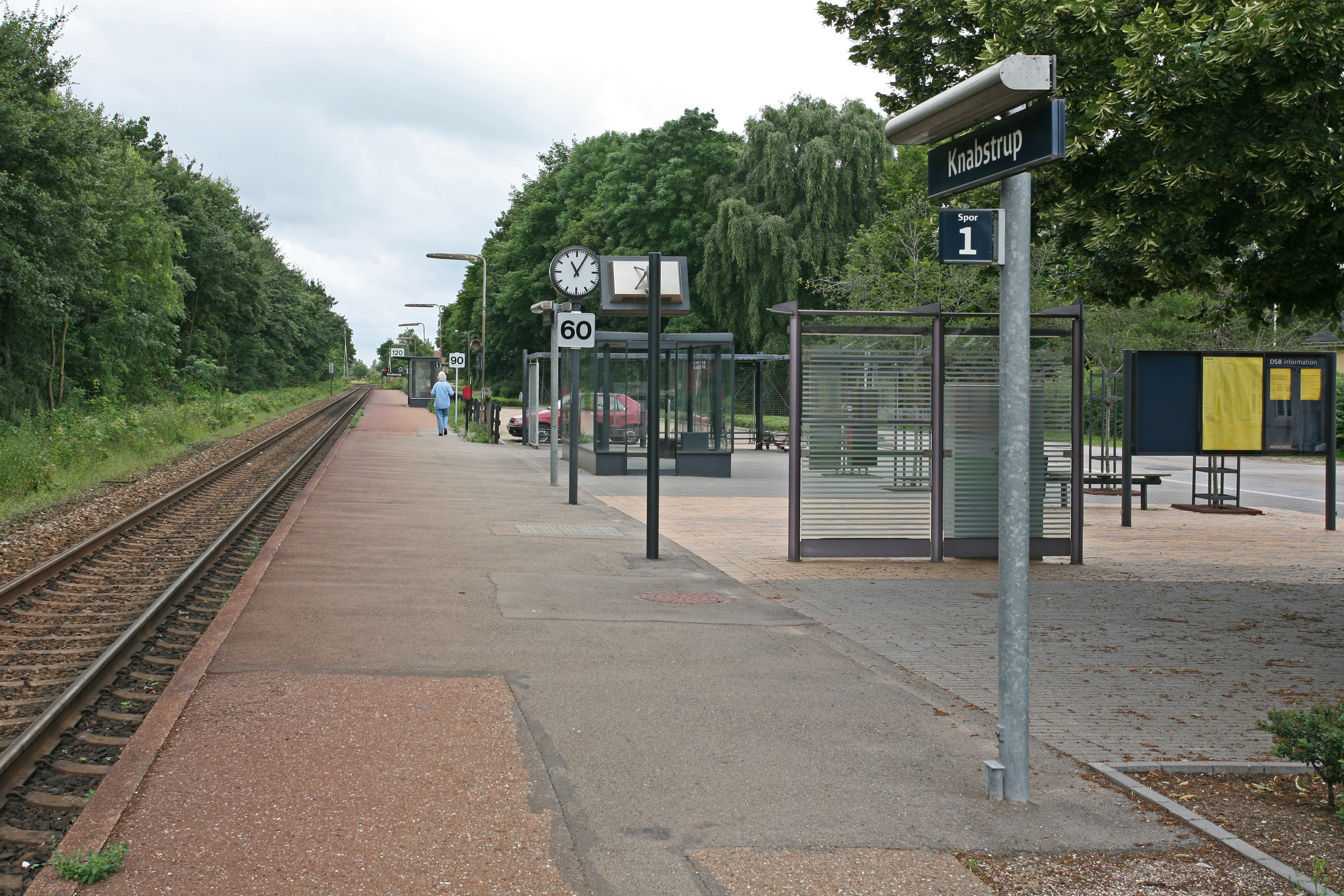
- Knabstrup railway station

- Location in Denmark Knabstrup (Denmark Region Zealand)
- Coordinates: 55.66493°N 11.55391°E
- Country: Denmark
- Region: Region Zealand
- Municipality: Holbæk Municipality

Area
  - Urban: 0.6 km^{2} (0.23 sq mi)

Population (2026)
  - Urban: 1,105
  - Urban density: 1,800/km^{2} (4,800/sq mi)
- Time zone: UTC+1 (CET)
  - Summer (DST): UTC+2 (CEST)
- Postal code: DK-4440 Mørkøv

Knabstrup is a small railway town, with a population of 1,105 (1 January 2026), in Holbæk Municipality, Region Zealand in Denmark.

Knabstrup Manor, where the horse breed Knabstrupper was bred, is located two kilometres (1.2 mi) southeast of the town.

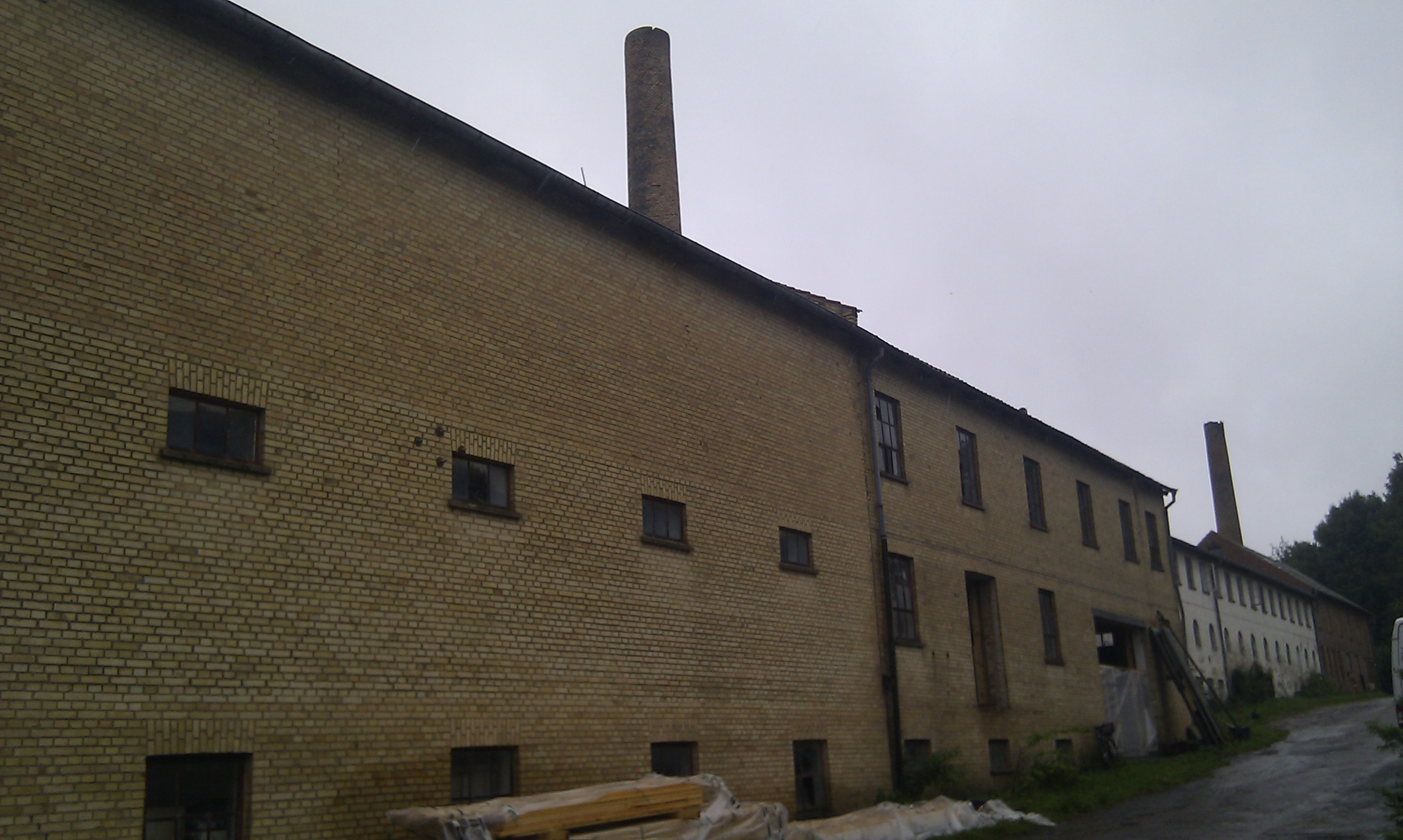
Knabstrup Teglværk

Knabstrup Teglværk, which is located about 300 metres (980 ft) south of the manor, was a brick and ceramic factory that was closed in 1988. Since 2008, the local environmental collective Makvärket has been working to convert 2,000 m^{2} (22,000 sq ft) of the former factory into a center for ecological awareness.

Knabstrup is served by Knabstrup railway station located at the Northwest Line between Roskilde and Kalundborg.
