= Mosquito Bay Plantation =

Coordinates: 18°20′22.29″N 64°58′26.57″W

Mosquito Bay plantation was owned by Johan Lorentz Carstens, who was also the owner of the plantations Perlen on Saint Thomas, U.S. Virgin Islands and a smaller plantation on St. Jan.

== History ==
In 1721 there were 77 sugar plantations on St. Thomas, 28 of them had their own sugar factories and 11 distilled rum. There is no record of when rum first began to be made. What is known is that the West Indies sugar and rum production grew side by side.

Rum was known under such names as Rum bullion, Rhum and Rum booze, and the name probably comes from the Latin word for sugar, "saccarum". The process by which the waste products of sugar were made into Rum took place in the Rum house or distillery. The syrup of four barrels of sugar usually gave a barrel of Rum.

Mosquito Bay was the first plantation where baptism of slaves took place. The owner Johan Lorentz Carstens supported a missionary called Martin who worked for the Moravian Church (Herrnhuter brothers – whose founder and high superintendent was Count Nikolas Ludwig von Zinzendorf). Johan Lorentz Carstens owned the house where the Brethren held their meetings in the evening.

Two of his slaves, Mingo and Andreas, became Martin’s first native helpers, and when the missionary caught the tropical fever, Mrs. Carstens took care of him and nursed him through his illness. The Brethren were no longer poor and homeless. They could put money aside and Carstens helped them to buy a plantation that they called Bassoon Mountain. Carstens’ friendly disposition towards the Brethren was an exception. Most of planters viewed the missionary work as an encumbrance and tried by all means to get it stopped.

== Production process ==
On a typical plantation the cookhouse or the "factory" in which sugar juice was processed into raw sugar or muscavado was near the sugar mill. A part of the factory was also used for curinghouse and storage space for sugar, molasses (syrup) and Rum. A wing of the factory was usually designed as Distillery, where the famous Rum was made. All sugar mills were built on higher soil than the cooking, so the juice could run down by itself. In the cookery it was led into a large kettle, siphon, where it was heated while adding a little unlime lime (lime). Then it was allowed to cool while the dirt that rises to the surface was skimmed off using a long shank of foam.

All impurities, together with the non-crystallized sugar, dirty molasses (syrup) and other unusable by-products were carefully stored, as it was used later for the Rum distillation. The molasses could be sold as cheap sweetener, but most plants preferred to use it to make Rum. Each planter, or more specifically his Rum burner, was convinced that his special recipe for making Rum - or the kill-devil, as it was called - was the best. The longer the mask was allowed to ferment, the stronger the Rum became. A shorter fermentation process produced a lighter type of Rum called Demerara.

== Current ==
St. Thomas is today transformed into a modern tourist resort. The flat fields at Mosquito Bay, where Carstens had his plantation, are covered by the concrete runways of Harry S. Truman Airport.

St. Thomas still remembers her Danish past. The islands massive development in connection with the circumstances that cultivation of sugar stopped at an early stage, has resulted in far fewer ruins here that on St. Croix. Today, Carstens’ property, Perlen, is just as impossible to locate as Mosquito bay.
