= Johan Lorentz Castenschiold =

Danish nobleman, landowner and planter

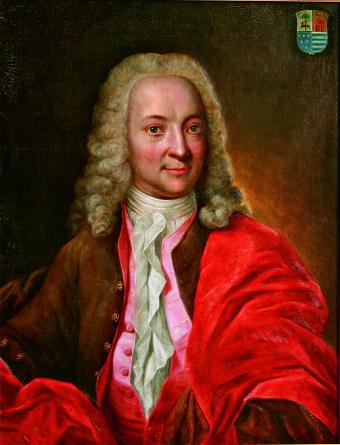
- Born: 13 May 1705; Saint Thomas, Danish West Indies
- Died: 19 June 1745 (aged 40); Knabstrup, Denmark
- Occupations: landowner, planter
- Spouse: Jacoba von Holten (m. 1728)

Johan Lorentz Castenschiold (13 May 1705 – 19 June 1745) was a Danish nobleman, landowner and planter.

== Early life ==
Johan Lorentz Carstens was born on 13 May 1705 on the island of Saint Thomas in the Danish West Indies. His parents were a Danish planter named Jørgen Carstens and his wife Margrethe Volckers. Margrethe was the daughter of Governor Johan Lorensen, a wealthy man whose financial status benefitted that of Jørgen's via the marriage. Prior to the marriage, Jørgen had already acquired a sugar plantation known as Mosquito Bay.

== Plantation-owning career ==
Carstens inherited the Mosquito Bay plantation in 1720 after his father died. He married in 1728 to Jacoba von Holten, daughter of former governor Joachim Melchior von Holten. As a result of the marriage, Carstens acquired ownership over two plantations formerly owned by the von Holten family, the Pearl and Crown estates. Carstens also acquired 400 tønder of land on Saint Croix when Denmark-Norway purchased the island from France in 1733.

== Later life and death ==
Carsten's family moved to Copenhagen in 1739, where they lived in a townhouse in Store Kirkestræde. Carsten continued to manage his slave plantations and dealings in the Danish sugar trade. Von Holten gave birth to two sons during her marriage to Carsten; first was Carl Adolph Carsten, who was born in 1740, and the second was Joachim Carsten, who was born in 1743. Castenschiold died from smallpox on 19 June 1747. He purchased Knabstrup Manor in 1745 and was ennobled under the surname Castenschiold on 12 March that same year. His widow purchased the property of Hørbygaard in 1748. She lived on the estate until her death in 1751.
