= Vestergade 15 =

Historical building in Copenhagen, Denmark

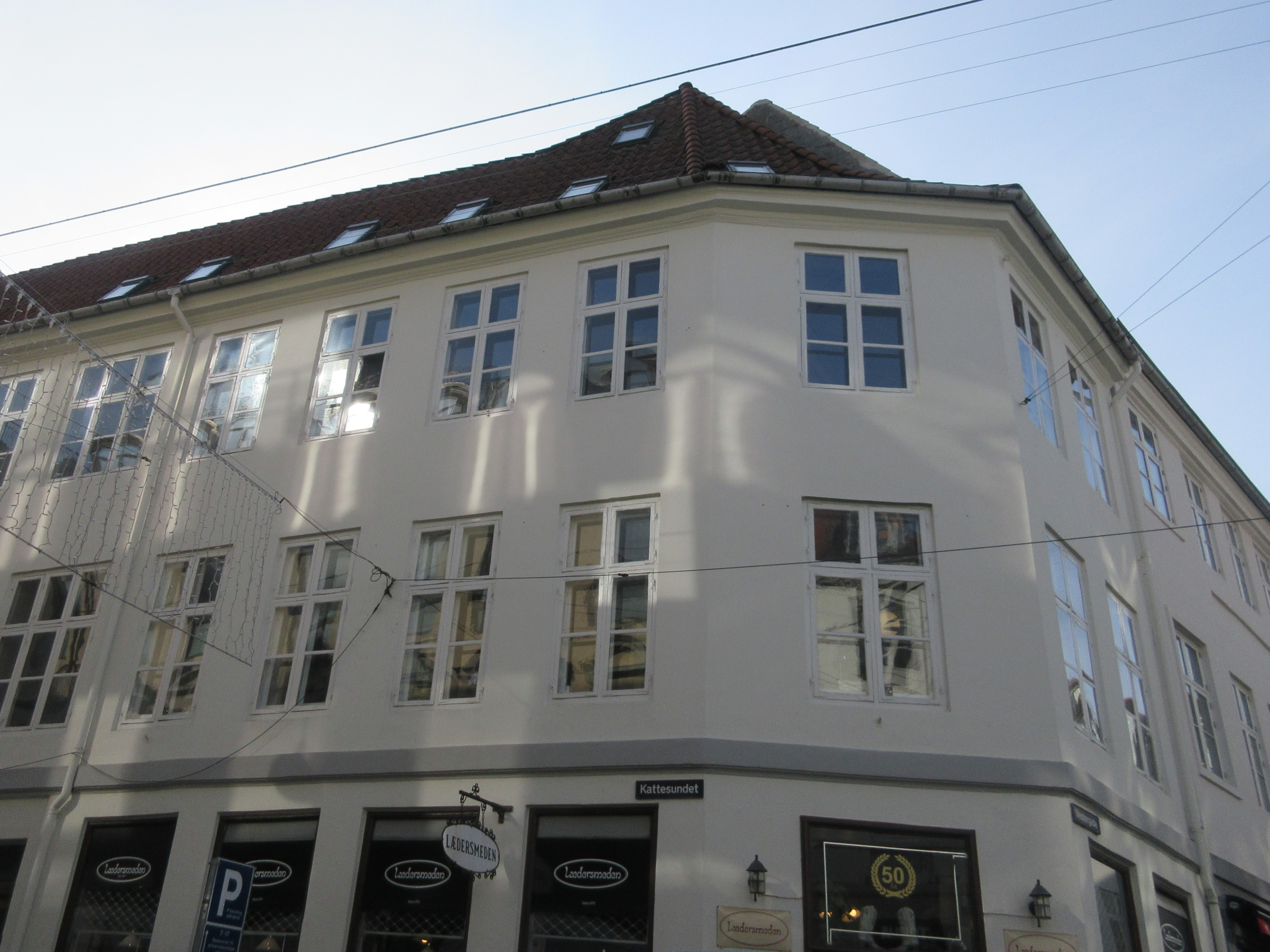
- Interactive map of Vestergade 15

General information
- Location: Copenhagen, Denmark
- Coordinates: 55°40′39.29″N 12°34′12.72″E
- Completed: 1798
- Renovated: 1752, 1896, 1980

Vestergade 15 is a Neoclassical property situated at the corner of Vestergade and Kattesundet in central Copenhagen, Denmark. The building was listed in the Danish registry of protected buildings and places in 1918. Notable former residents include the Icelandic-Danish lawyer Brynjólfur Pétursson.

== History ==
=== 18th century ===
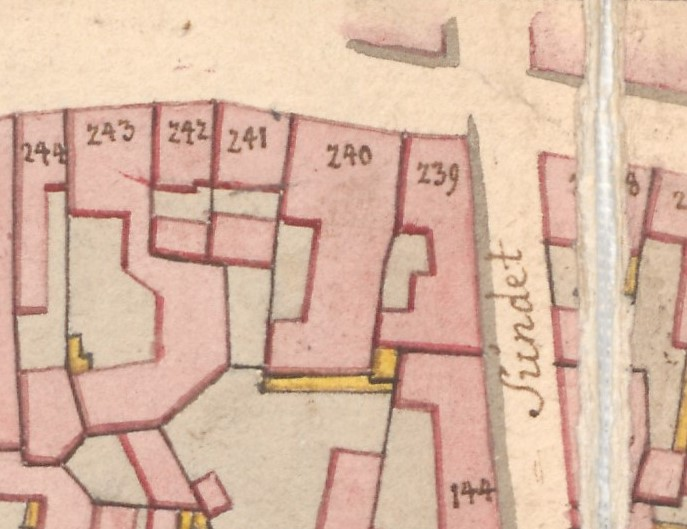
No. 239 seen on a detail from Christian Gedde's map of Copenhagen's West Quarter, 1757.

The site was part of two separate properties in the late 17th century. In Copenhagen's first cadastre of 1689 they were listed as No. 225 and No. 226. They were owned at that time by grocer (høker) Mikkel Jostsen (No. 225) and cooper Jacob Pedersen (No. 226). The properties were later merged into a single property. In the new cadastre of 1756, it was listed as No. 239. The owner at that time was tobacco spinner Niels Christensen Tromp.

At the time of the 1787 census, No. 239 was home to three households. Hans Brehdahl, a tobacco spinner, resided in the building with his wife M.Marie Westh, their three-year-old daughter, two daughters from his first marriage (aged 15 and 18), and one maid. Mogens Fransen, a beer seller (øltapper), resided in the building with his wife Berte Friderichs. Niels Aagesen, another beer seller, resided in the building with his wife Mette Jørgensen.

Together with most of the other buildings in the area, the property was completely destroyed in the Copenhagen Fire of 1795. The current building on the site was constructed in 1797–1798 by master mason Philip Lange and Lauritz Thrane.

=== 19th century ===
At the time of the 1801 census, No. 239 was home to four households. Peter Nielsen Lindom, a brewer, resided in the building with his wife Johanne Madsdatter, their five-year-old son Peter Madsen Lindom, two brewery workers and a maid. Gregorius Bendictus Mathiesen, a first lieutenant, resided in the building with his wife Barbara Kirstine Brandt, their one-year-old son Johannes Jensenius Mathiesen and one maid. Rasmus Holm, a senior clerk (fuldmægtig), resided in the building with his wife Margrethe Kirstine (née Dahl) and one maid. Bertel Jensen, a beer seller (øltapper), resided in the building with his wife Barbara Jensdatter and their two-year-old daughter Maren Kirtensdatter.

In the new cadastre of 1907, the property was listed as No. 46. It was owned at that time by vintner Johan Peder Møller.

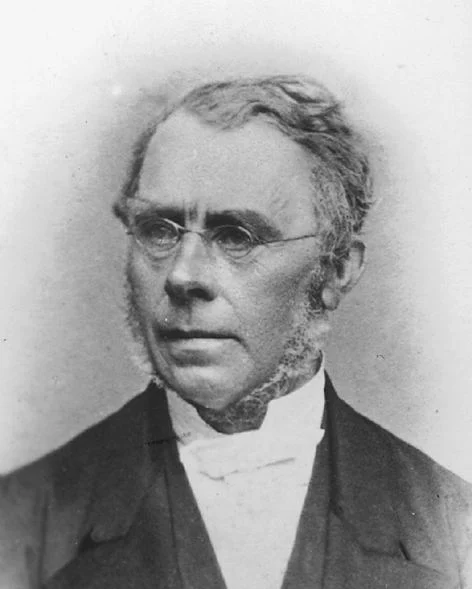
Brynjólfur Pétursson

The Icelandic lawyer Brynjólfur Pétursson was a resident of the building.

At the time of the 1840 census, No. 46 was home to just one household. Peter Jensen Bøygelund, a junk dealer, resided in the building with his wife Angenette Bøygelund, their three children (aged 15 to 22), three servants (two male and one female) and the workman Erich Jensen Bøygelund.

At the time of the 1845 census, No.. 46 was home to three households. Jebbe Knudsen, a master tailor, resided on the first floor with his wife Frederiche Hansen, their two daughters (aged four and nine) and one maid. Mads Cortzen, a music teacher, resided on the second floor with his wife Charlotte Holst and their five children (aged 19 to 27). The two sons were both associated the Royal Danish Orchestra, Ludvig (26) as a musician and Carl (19) as a pupil. Ole Pedersen, a grocer (høker), resided in the basement with his wife Kirsten Hansen and the lodger Niels Christian Tranekier (a master baker).

At the time of the 1850 census, No. 46 was again home to three households. Frederik Hendrichsen, a junk dealer, resided on the ground floor with his 14-year-old son Carl Frederik and the 21-year-old employee Niels Nielsen. August Lorentzen, a clerk working for the Royal Marine Insurance Company (Kgl. octr. Søe-Assurance Compagni), resided on the second floor with his a housekeeper and a maid.

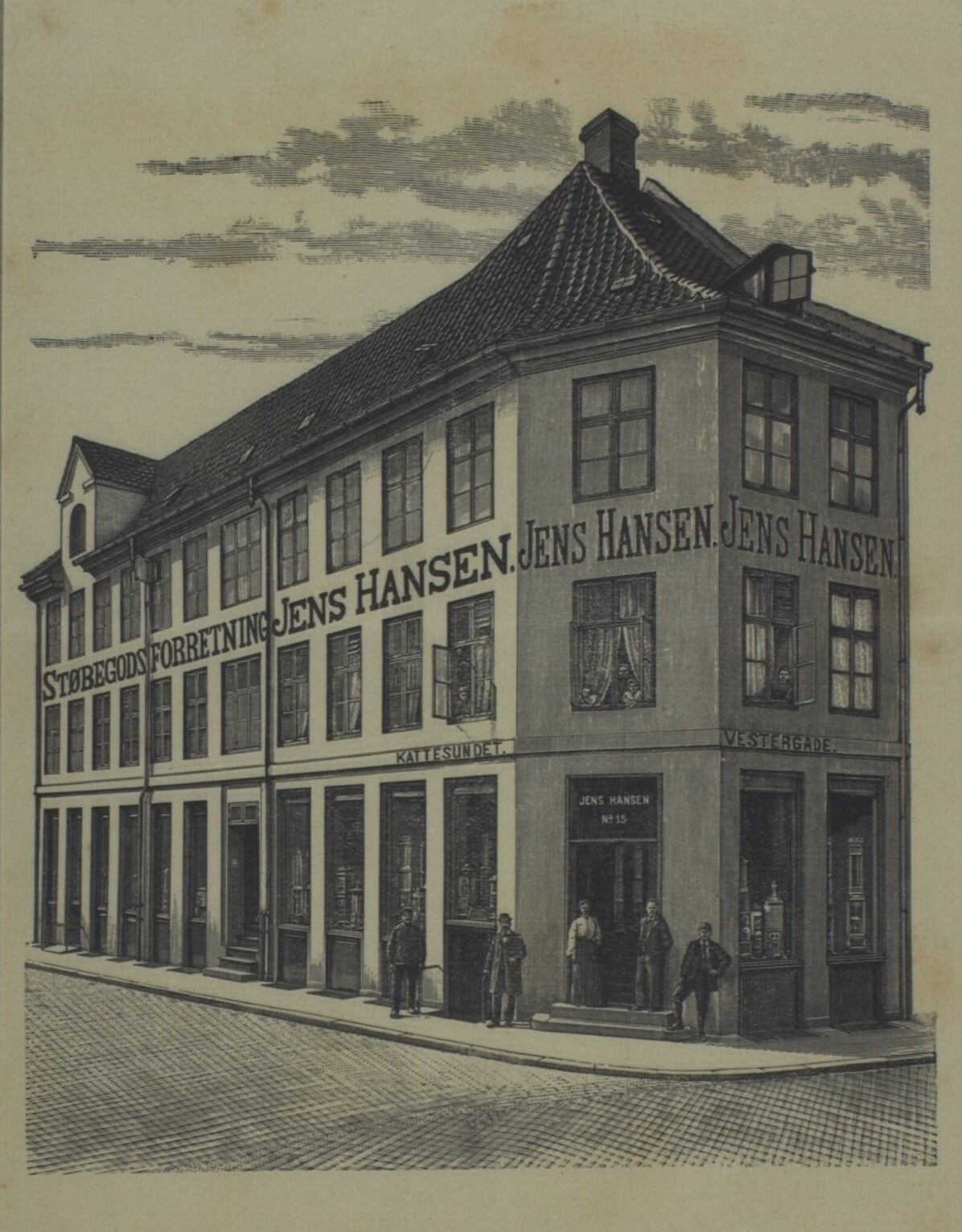
Jens Hansen's property.

When house numbering by street was introduced in 1859 as an alternative to the old cadastral numbers, No. 46 was listed as Bestergade 15/Kattesundet 2. At the time of the 1860 census, the property was again home to three households. Jens Hansen, an ironmonger, resided in the building with his wife Rosalia Bertoline Hansen and their two children (aged four and six). Hans Hammer Schløer, a retail clerk, resided in the building with his wife Anna Christine Margrethe Schløer and their two daughters (aged 11 and 12). Ernst David Jørgensen, a workman, resided in the building with his wife Cucilie Dorthea. Christen Peter Georg Borregaard, a jurist, resided in the building with three unmarried daughters (aged 30 to 37) and one maid.

== Architecture ==
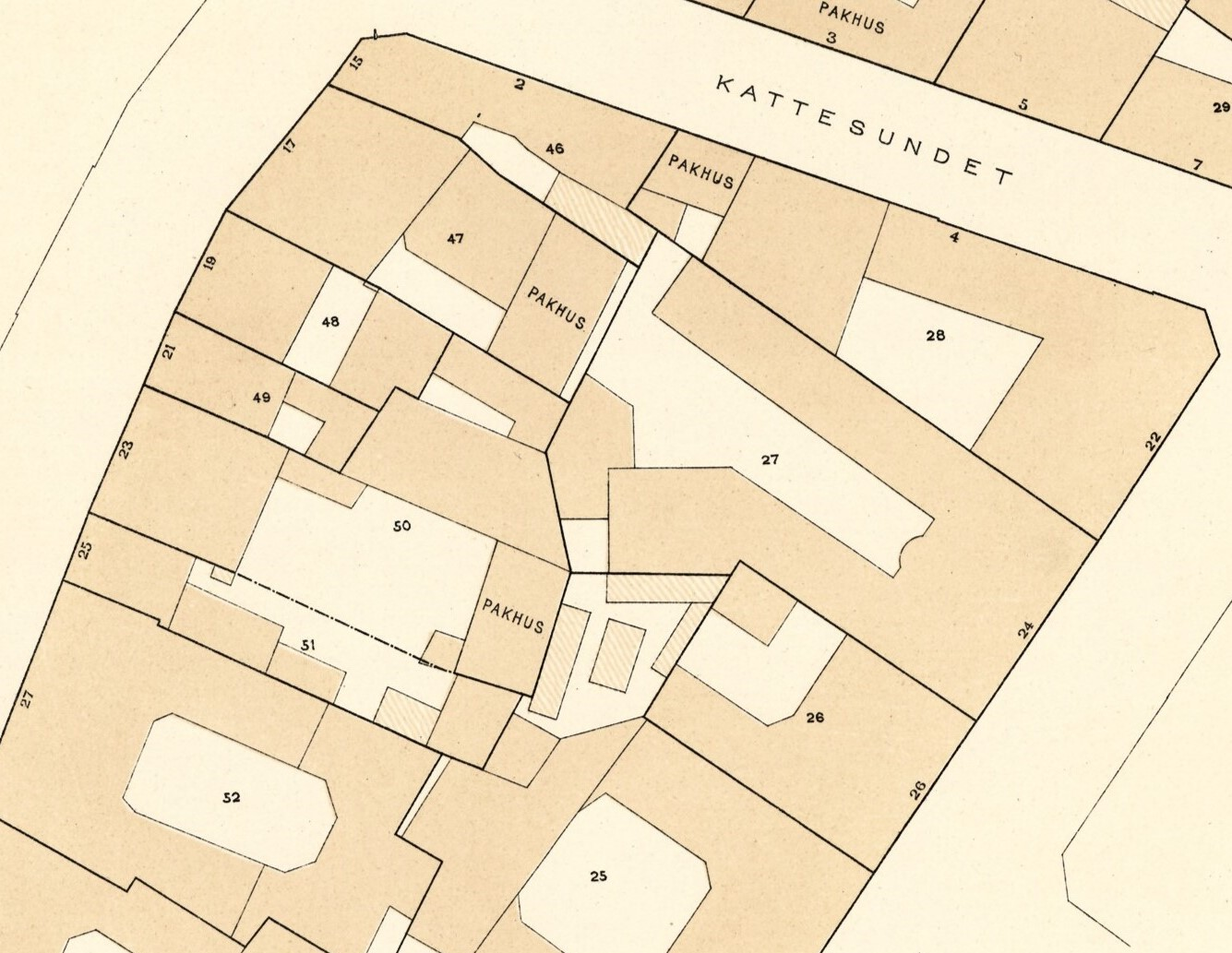
Vestergade 15 seen on a detail from one of Berggreen's block plans of Western Quarter, 1886-88.

The corner building is constructed with three storeys over a walk-out basement. It has a facade just two bays long on Vestergade and an 11-bay-long facade on Kattesundet, of which the slightly recessed gateway bay furthest to the south is wider than the other ones. The chamfered corner bay was dictated for all corner buildings by Jørgen Henrich Rawert's and Peter Meyn's guidelines for the rebuilding of the city after the fire so that the fire department's long ladder companies could navigate the streets more easily. The entrance to the ground floor was originally located in Vestergade while the basement entrance was located in the corner bay, but they changed places in connection with an adaptation of the building in 1862. The facade on Kattesundet is crowned by a small, arched wall dormer (originally with a pulley). A number of other wall dormers were removed before 1896. A perpendicular side wing, whose gable is partly visible from the street, extends from the Kattesundet Wing along the southern margin of a narrow courtyard.

== Todau ==
The property is owned by Frieda Catharina Christiansen. It contains a retail space in the ground floor and residential apartments on the two upper floors.

== Gallery ==
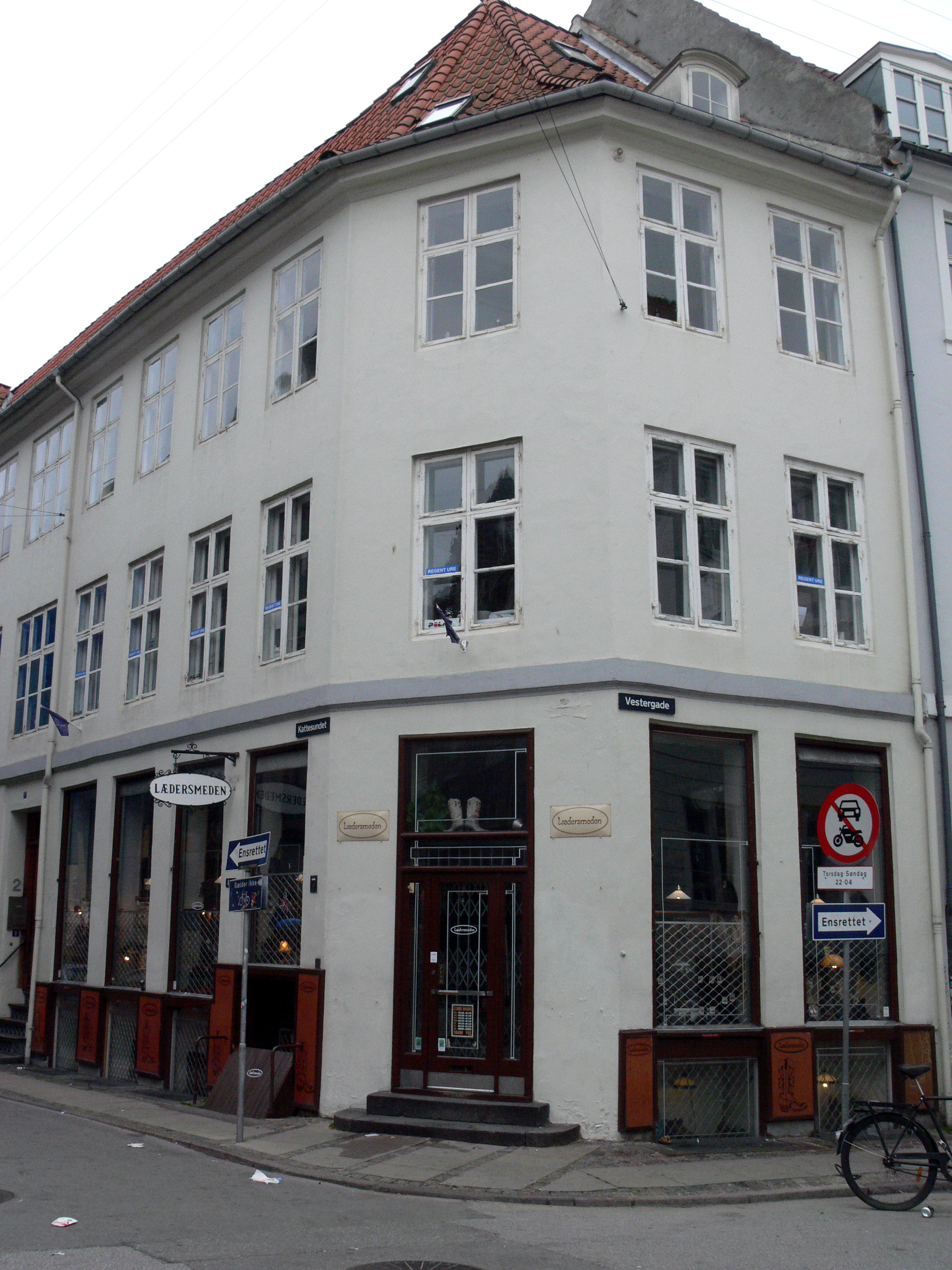
The corner of Vestergade and Kattesundet.

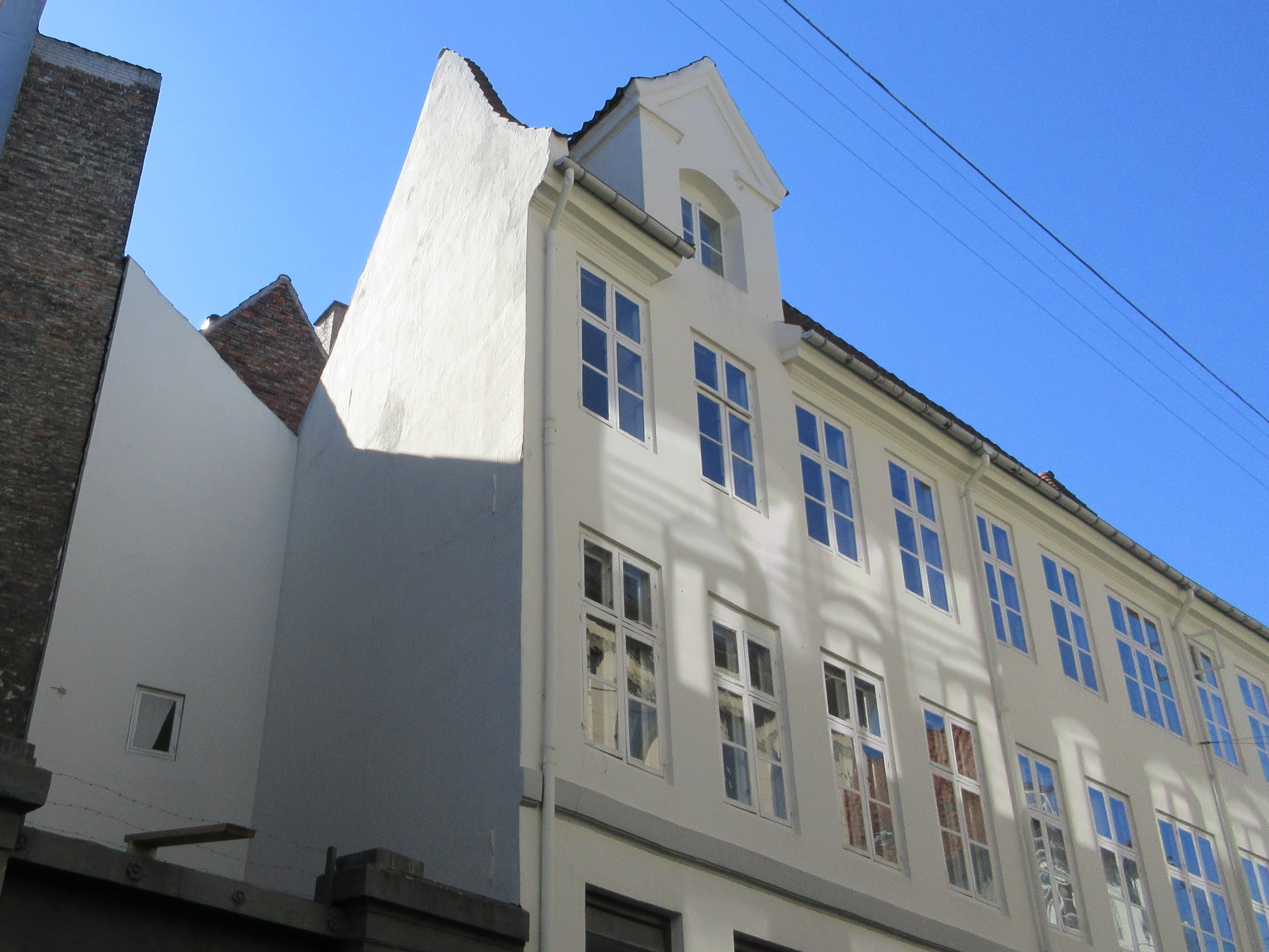
The building seen from Kattesundet.

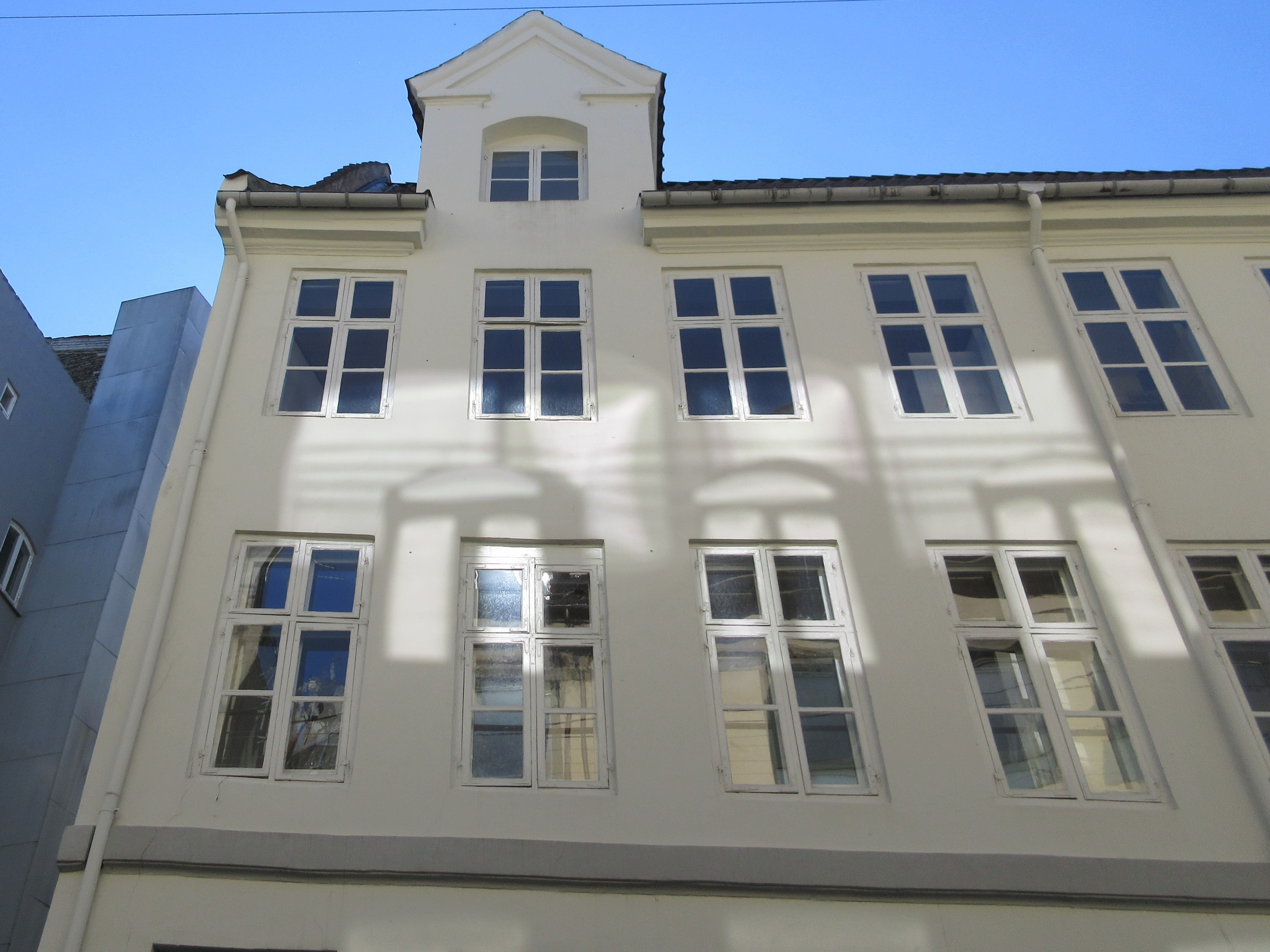
The facade on Kattesundet.
