= Regstrup railway station =

Railway station in Northwest Zealand, Denmark

Regstrup
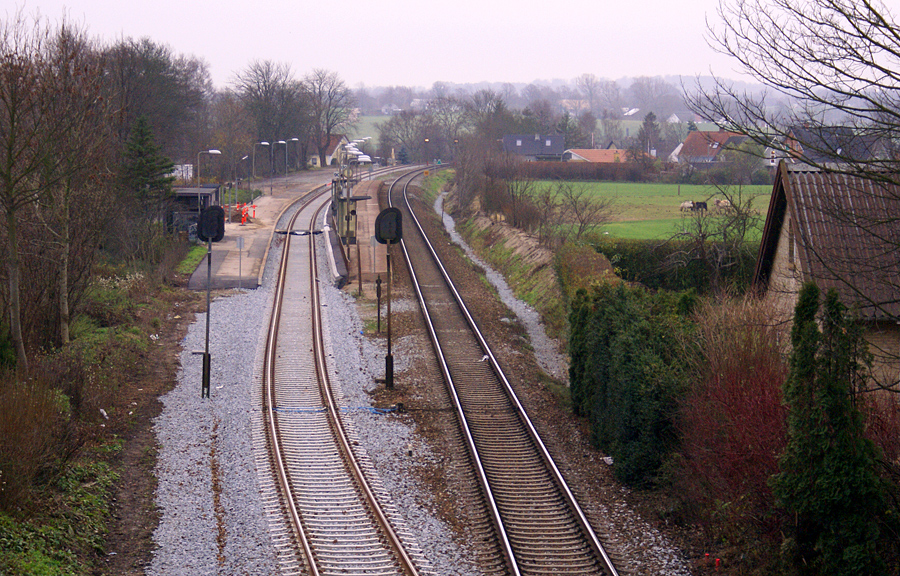
- Regstrup station in 2008

General information
- Location: Hovedgaden 111; 4420 Regstrup; Holbæk Municipality; Denmark
- Coordinates: 55°40′38.91″N 11°36′45.54″E
- Elevation: 16.6 metres (54 ft)
- Owner: DSB (station infrastructure); Banedanmark (rail infrastructure)
- Line: Northwest Line
- Platforms: 2 side platforms
- Tracks: 2
- Train operators: DSB

Construction
- Architect: Niels Peder Christian Holsøe

Other information
- Station code: Rt
- Website: Official website

History
- Opened: December 30, 1874; 151 years ago

Services
Preceding station	DSB	Following station
Holbæk towards Østerport	Copenhagen–Kalundborg Regional train	Knabstrup towards Kalundborg
Location

Regstrup railway station is a railway station serving the small railway town of Regstrup between the cities of Holbæk and Kalundborg on the island of Zealand, Denmark. The station is located in the northern part of the town by its main artery Hovedgaden.

Regstrup railway station is situated on the Northwest Line from Roskilde to Kalundborg. The station opened in 1874. It offers regional rail services to Kalundborg, Holbæk, Roskilde and Copenhagen operated by the national railway company DSB.

== History ==
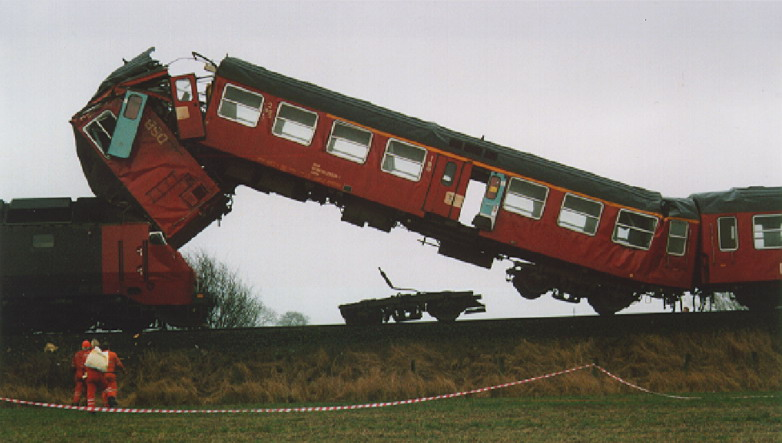
The 1998 Regstrup railway collision.

Regstrup railway station opened as one of the original intermediate stations on the Northwest Line between Roskilde and Kalundborg which opened on 30 December 1874.

On 6 January 1998, the station was the site of the Regstrup railway collision, where two passenger trains collided head-on c. 120 m (390 ft) northeast of the station. Three people were seriously injured and 23 people suffered minor injuries in the accident.

== Architecture ==
Regstrup station's station building was built to designs by the Danish railway architect Niels Peder Christian Holsøe (1826–1895), known for the numerous railway stations he designed across Denmark in his capacity of head architect of the Danish State Railways. The station building was torn down in October 2002.

== Services ==
The station offers frequent regional rail services to Kalundborg, Holbæk, Roskilde and Copenhagen operated by the national railway company DSB.

== See also ==
- List of railway stations in Denmark
- Rail transport in Denmark
- History of rail transport in Denmark
- Transport in Denmark
