= Adolf Ahrens =

German politician (1879–1957)

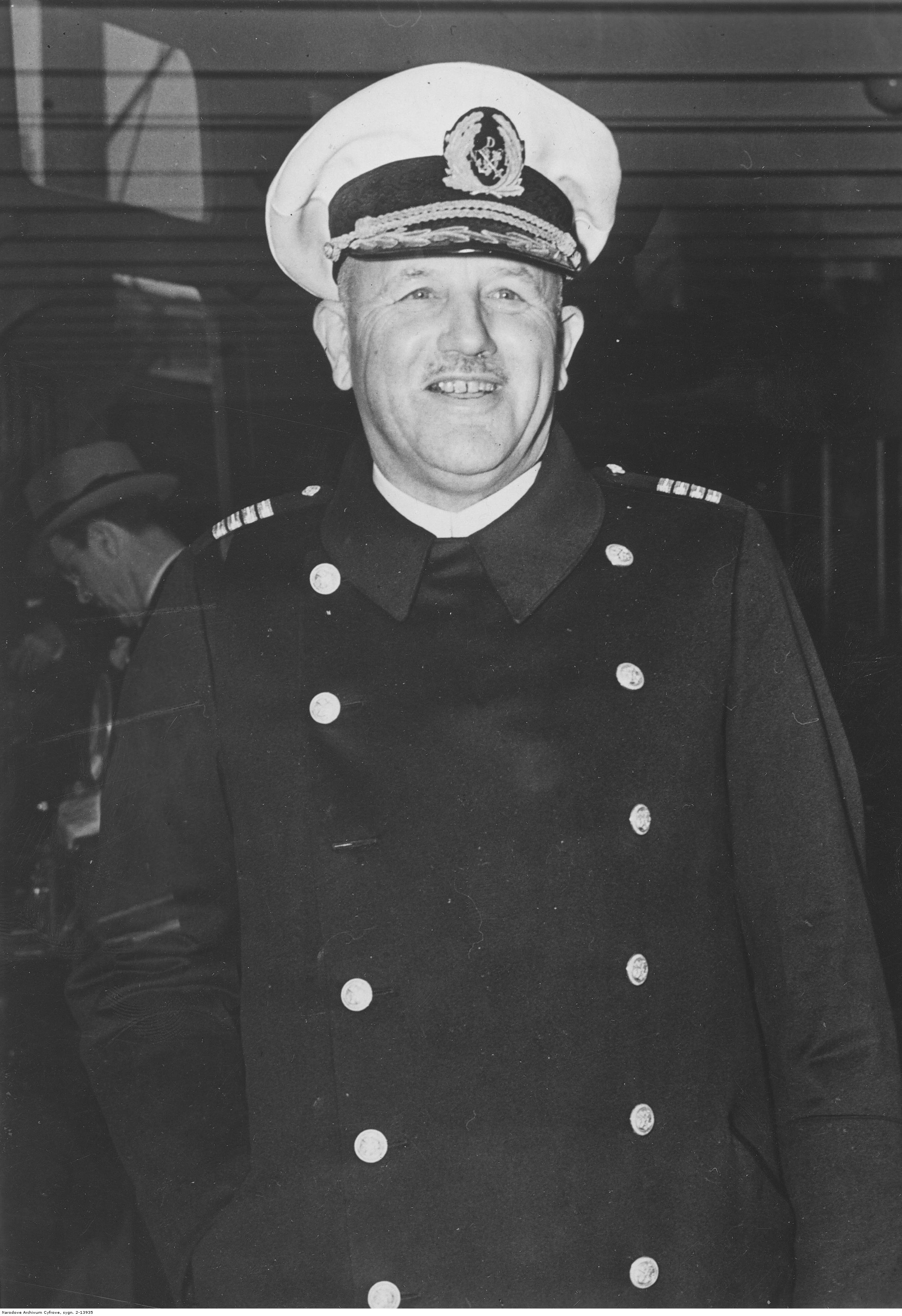

Member of the Bundestag
- In office 7 September 1949 – 7 September 1953

Personal details
- Born: 17 September 1879 Bremerhaven
- Died: 21 January 1957 (aged 77)
- Party: DP

Adolf Ahrens (17 September 1879 – 21 January 1957) was a German politician of the German Party (DP) and former member of the German Bundestag.

== Life ==
Ahrens was a member of the first German Bundestag (MdB) from 1949 to 1953. He was elected via the national list of the German Party (DP) in Bremen.

== Literature ==
Herbst, Ludolf; Jahn, Bruno (2002). Vierhaus, Rudolf (ed.). Biographisches Handbuch der Mitglieder des Deutschen Bundestages. 1949–2002 [Biographical Handbook of the Members of the German Bundestag. 1949–2002] (in German). München: De Gruyter - De Gruyter Saur. p. 1715. ISBN 978-3-11-184511-1.
