= Kronprinsessegade Barracks =

Historic building in Copenhagen, Denmark

- Kronprinsessegades Kaserne
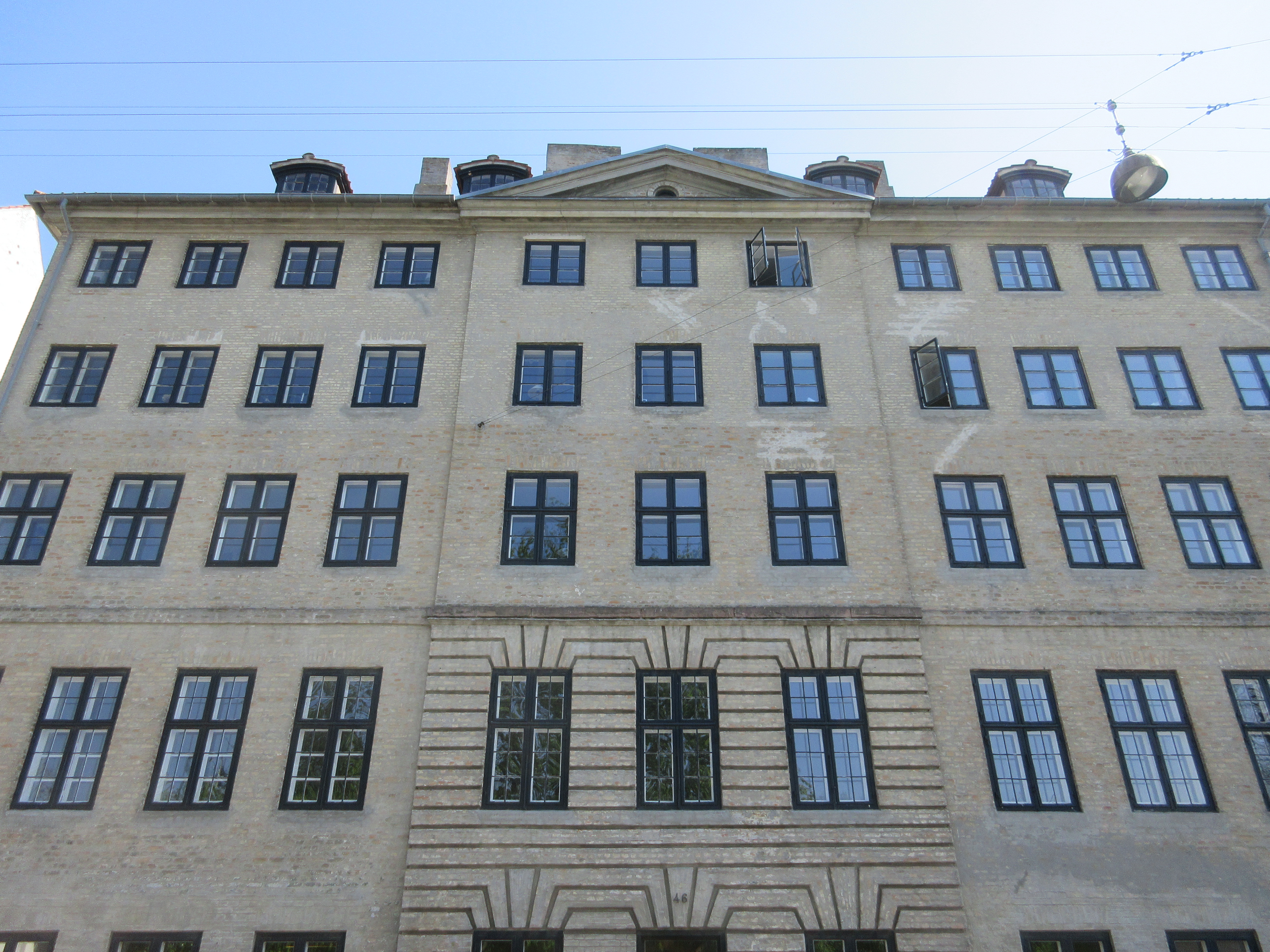
- Interactive map of the Kronprinsessegade Barracks area

General information
- Location: Copenhagen, Denmark
- Coordinates: 55°41′08″N 12°35′00″E
- Completed: 1806

Design and construction
- Architect: Jørgen Henrich Rawert

Kronprinsessegade Barracks is a former artillery barracks at Kronprinsessegade 46 in Copenhagen, Denmark. The complex was listed on the Danish registry of protected buildings and places in 1918.

== History ==
The site was acquired by master builder Frantz Philip Lange (1756–1805) in 1802. He offered to use it for the construction of new barracks for the Zealand Infantry Regiment (Sjællandske Infanteri Regiment). It was inaugurated in 1803 and expanded by Andreas Hallander and Jørgen Heinrich Revert in 1807. It supplemented the Old Artillery Barracks in Christianshavn. H. C. G. F. Hedemann (1792–1859), then a captain in the Jutland Court Regiment, had a residence in the complex from 1834 to 1837.

The complex was decommissioned in 1914. It was listed on the Danish registry of protected buildings and places in 1918.

== Architecture ==
The five-storey main wing (No. 46-46b-c) is 11 bays wide and has a three-bay nedian risalit. A 17-bay side wing (No. 46d) extends from the rear side of the building. The building at No. 46a and the rear wing at No. 46e were built by Andreas Hallander (and city builder Jørgen Heinrich Rawert in 1807.

== Gallery ==
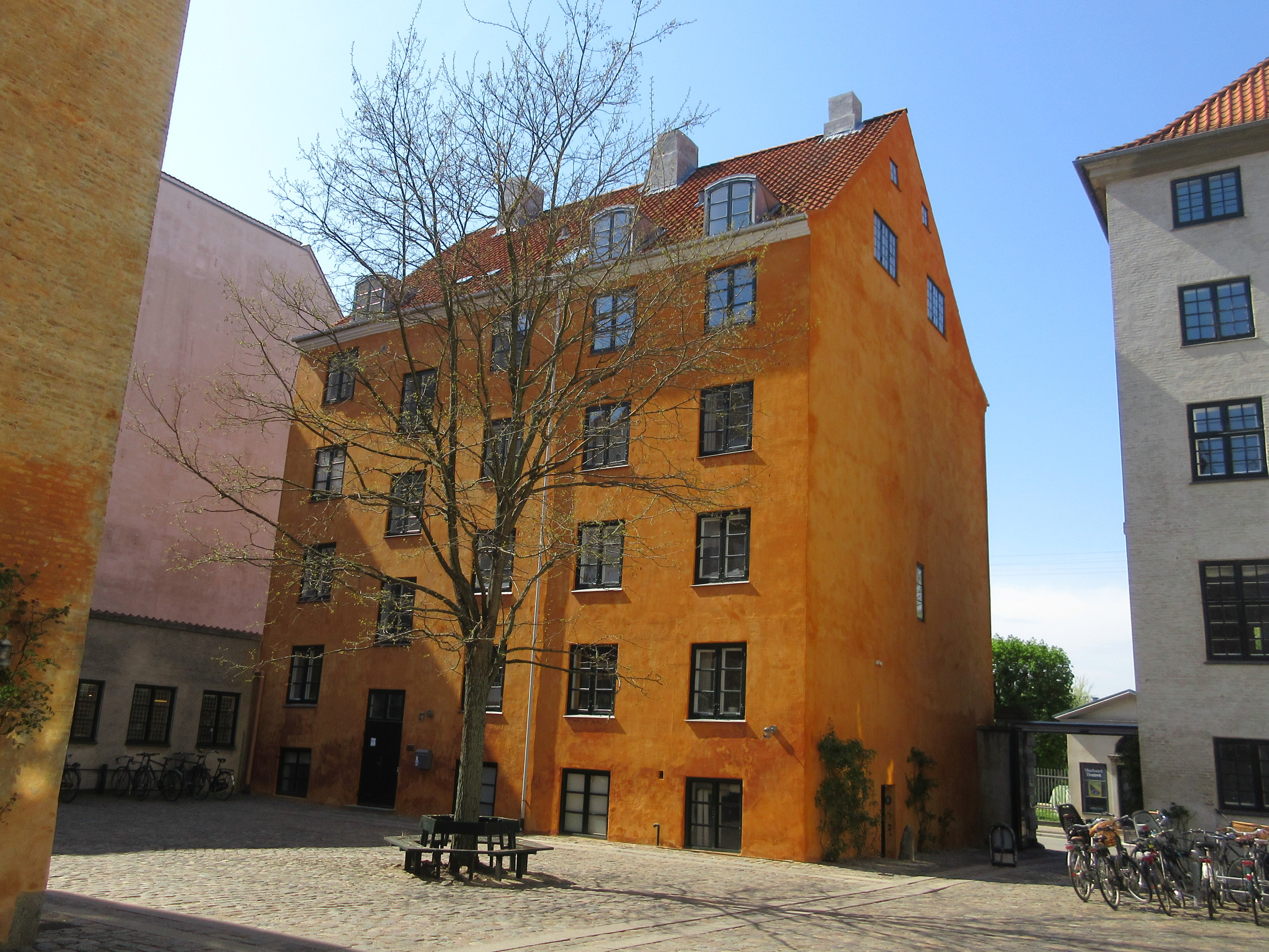
No. 46a seen from the courtyard

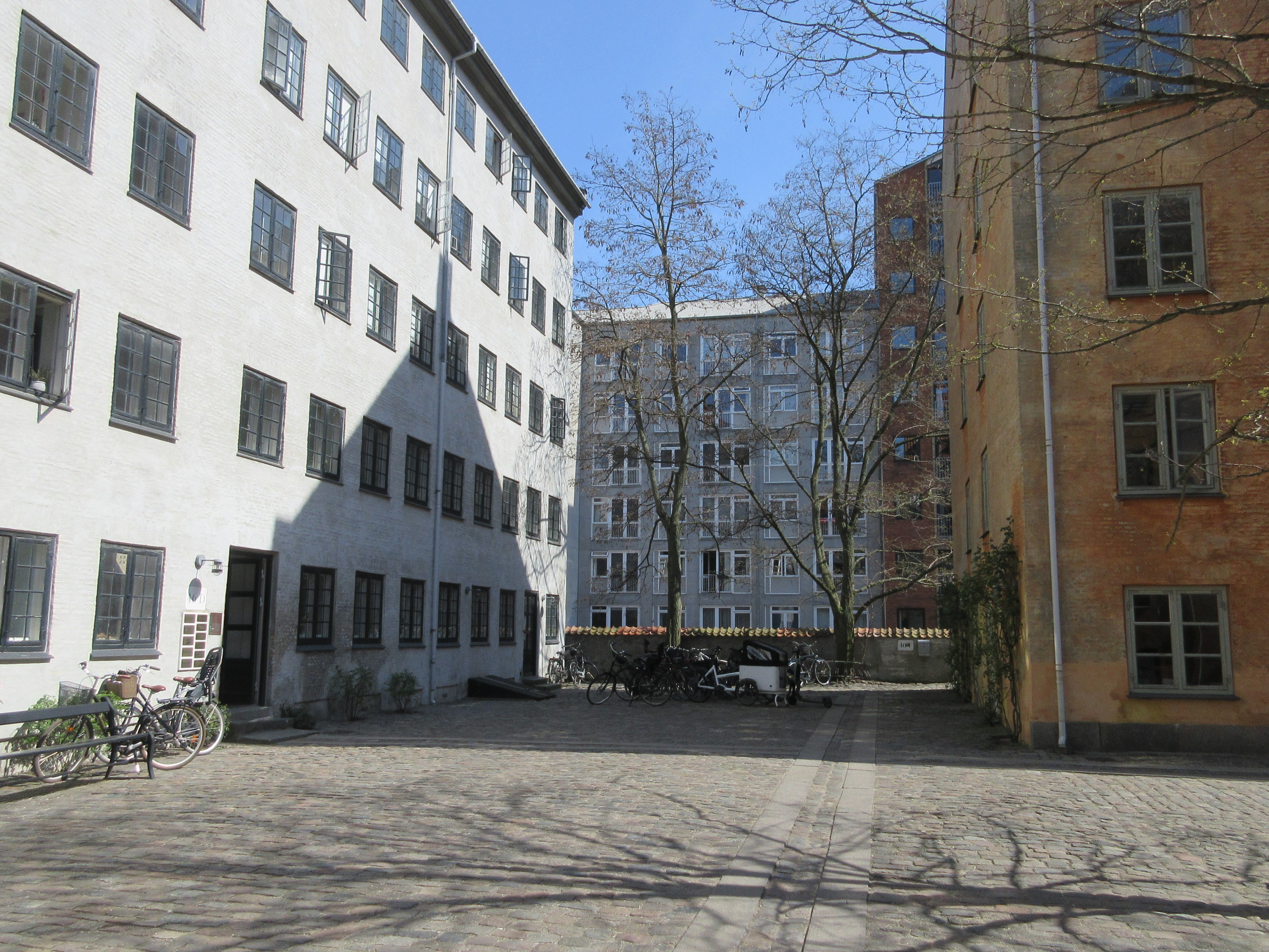
The courtyard

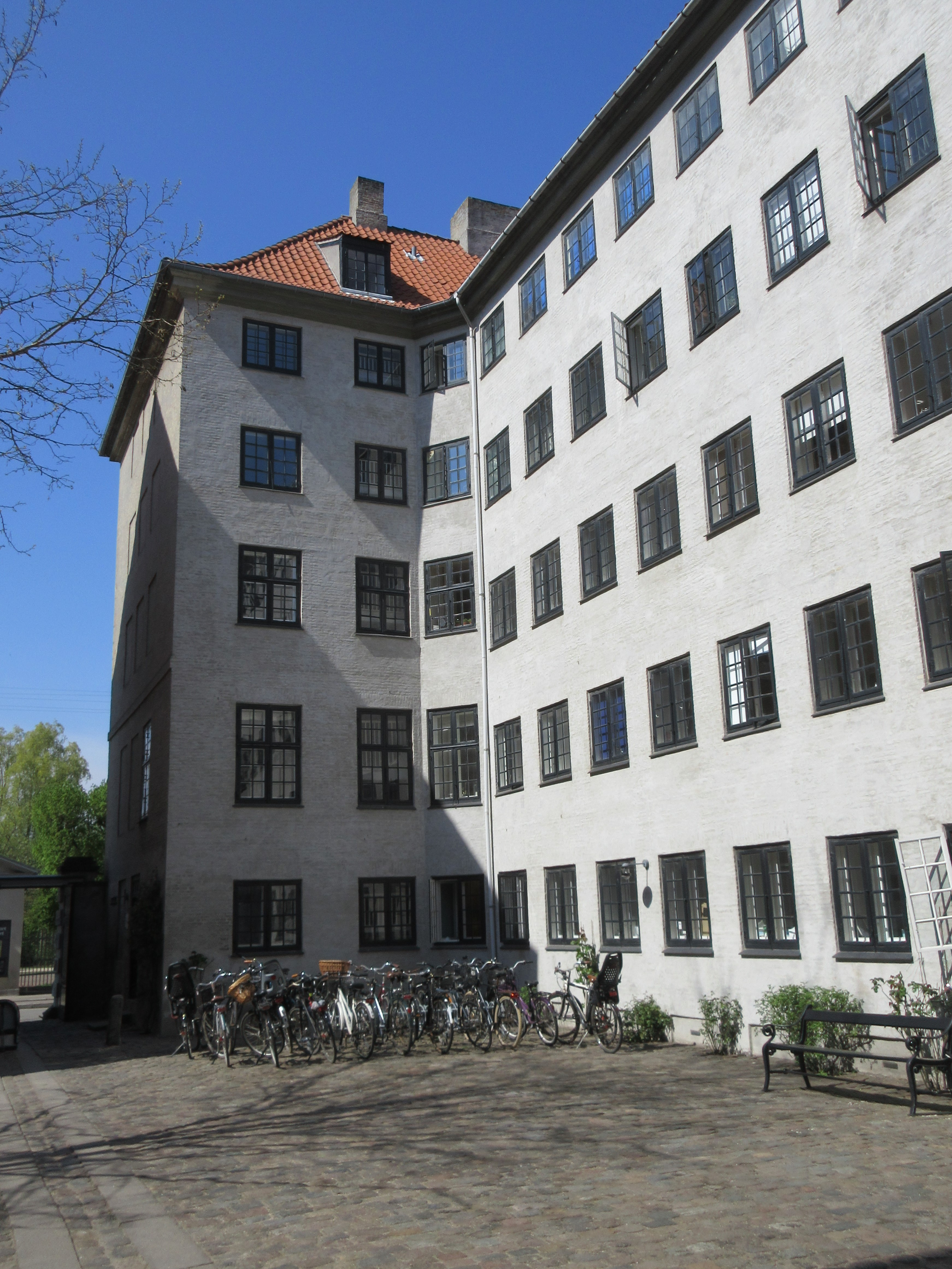
The side wing with the rear side of the main wing in the background
