= Knabstrup Manor =

Manor house near Holbæk, Zealand, Denmark

- Knabstrup Hovedgård
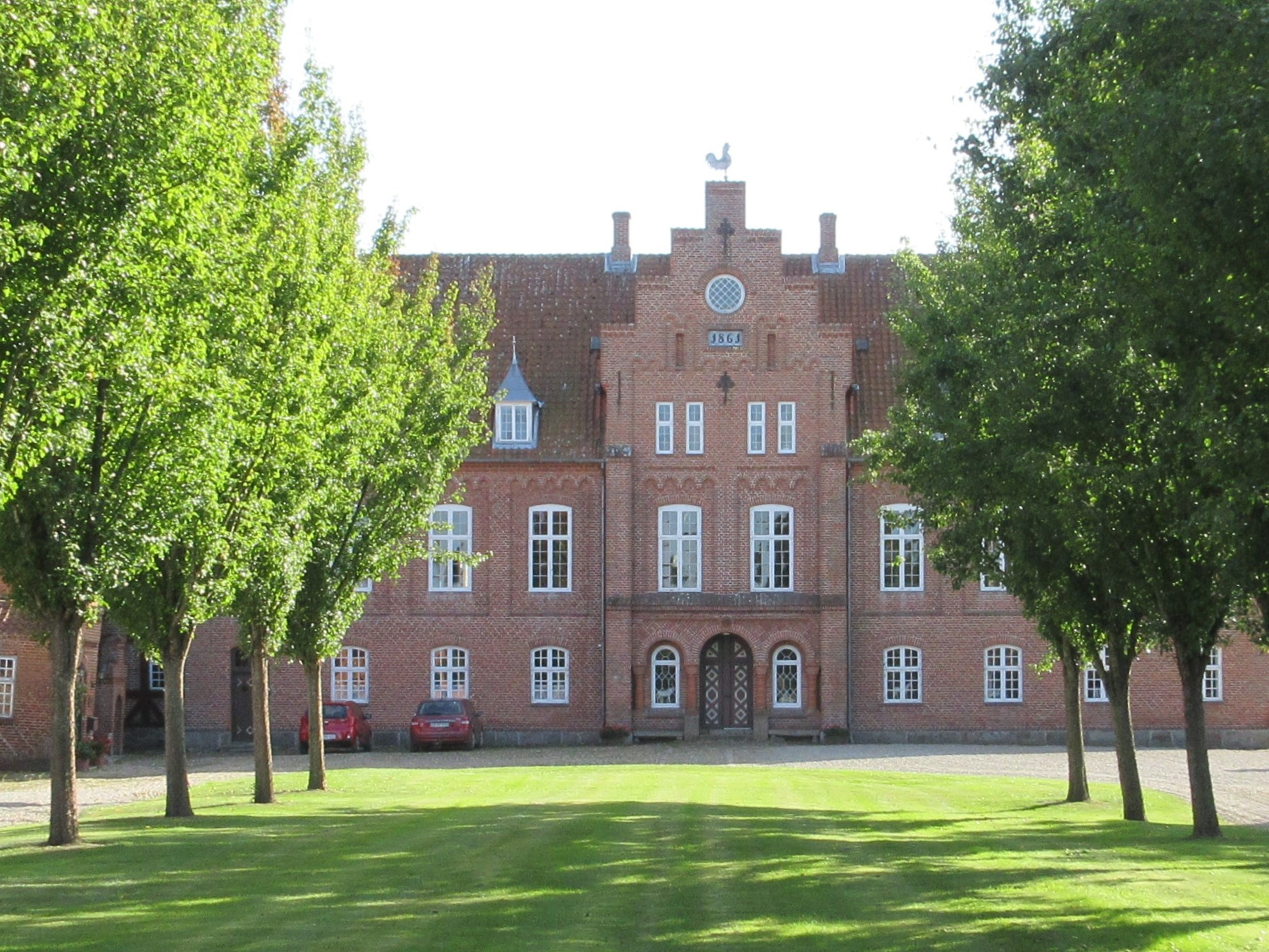
- Knabstrup Manor

General information
- Architectural style: Historicism
- Location: Holbæk Municipality, Denmark, Denmark
- Coordinates: 55.6525°N 11.5665°E
- Construction started: 37 July 1861
- Inaugurated: 30 October 1862
- Client: Willars Knudsen Lunn
- Owner: Knabstrup Gods A/S

Design and construction
- Architect: Vilhelm Dahlerup

Knabstrup Manor is a manor house located near Holbæk on the Danish island of Zealand. It traces its history to before 1288.

== History ==
Knabstrup is one of the oldest manor houses in Denmark. It is first mentioned in 1288 when it was confiscated from Niels Henriksen, a member of the Hvide dynasty, for his participation in the murder of Eric V in 1286.

Nothing is known about the earliest building but in 1460 Iver Axelsen Thott, who then owned the property, began constructing a complex similar to Lilø Manor in Scania which he also owned.

The estate was acquired by Frederik Nielsen Parsberg after a fire had destroyed the main building in 1620 and he decided to rebuild it approximately 700 m from the location of the old site.

In 1776, the estate was sold on foreclosure and acquired by Christian Ditlev Lunn, a theologian who had turned to farming. After his death in 1812, the property was taken over by his son, Willars Knudsen Lunn, but slowly fell into a state of disrepair. It was finally decided to build a new main building, a project which was carried out by his son, Carl Frederik August, who had taken over management of the estate in 1846.

The project also included a brickyard and an oven was constructed from 1856 to 1859.

The new main building was designed by Vilhelm Dahlerup, then a young, unknown architect but later a prominent figure in Danish architecture. Construction took place from 1861 to 1862.

== Buildings ==
Knabstrup is a three-winged building in Historicist style. The east wing of the old building was incorporated in the new house but redesigned to fit the two other wings. Building materials were re-used as far as possible, and the main wing has Baroque doors in from the old manor house. The widow seat Dorotheaslyst was built from 1799 to 1802 by Philip Lange, the son of Philip de Lange, and is listed.

== Horse breeding ==
The Danish horse breed Knabstrupper is named after the estate where it was bred by Major V. Lunn in the early 19th century.

== Owners ==
- pre-1259: The Crown
- 1259–1375: Roskilde Bishop's seat
- 1375–1436: The Crown
- 1436–1444: Poul Laxmand
- 1444: Margrethe Poulsdatter Laxmand néeThott
- 1444–1487: Iver Axelsen Thott
- 1487: Beate Ivarsdatter Thott néeTrolle
- 1487–1505: Arild Birger Trolle
- 1505–1541: Jacob Trolle
- 1541–1546: Else Poulsdatter Laxmand née Gyldensterine
- 1546–1561: Gjørvel Abrahamsdatter Gyldenstierne (1) Ulfstand (2) Ulfstand
- 1561–1681: Lisbeth Trolle néeSparre
- 1681–1610: Gabriel Sparre
- 1610–1622: Johan Sparre
- 1622–1653: Frederik Parsberg
- 1653–1662: Sophie Kaas néeParsberg
- 1662–1672: Niels Frederiksen Parsberg / Jørgen Frederiksen Parsberg / Verner Frederiksen Parsberg
- 1672–1685: Jørgen Frederiksen Parsberg
- 1685: Assessor Sidenborg
- 1685: Enke Fru Sidenborg
- 1685–1695: Frederik Wittinghoff baron Scheel
- 1695–1730: Schack baron Brockdorff
- 1730–1732: Sophie Charlotte Scheel néeBrockdorff
- 1732–1745: Maximilian Wilhelm von Dombroich
- 1745–1747: Johan Lorentz Castenschiold
- 1747–1760: The estate after Johan Lorentz Castenschiold
- 1760–1764: Carl Adolph Castenschiold
- 1764–1770: Jørgen Jørgensen
- 1770–1772: Enke Fru Jørgensen née von Hielmcrone
- 1772–1776: Jørgen von Hielmcrone
- 1776–1814: Christian Ditlev Lunn
- 1814–1865: Willars Knudsen Lunn
- 1865–1886: Carl Frederik August Willarsen Lunn
- 1886–1929: Erasmus Sigismund Lunn
- 1929–1931: Knud William Lunn
- 1931–1960: Knabstrup Gods A/S v/a Kurator Knud William Lunn
- 1960–1980: Knabstrup Gods A/S v/a Kurator Bodil Lunn
- 1980–2007: Knabstrup Gods A/S v/s Kurator Gerda Lunn Gram
- 2008-present: Knbstrup Gods A/S v/s Kurator Gorm Lunn
