= Listed buildings in Lejre Municipality =

This list of listed buildings in Lejre Municipality is a list of listed buildings in Lejre Municipality, Denmark.

== The list ==
=== 4000 Roskilde ===
Listing name	Image	Location	Coordinates	Description
Hallisgård		Ravnshøjvej 40, 4000 Roskilde		The residential wing of a half-timberedm four-winged farm dating from the second half of the 18th century
Hallisgård		Ravnshøjvej 40, 4000 Roskilde		The east, west and north wing of which the east and west wings date from the second half of the 18th century and the north wing dates from the early 20th century and the cobbled courtyard
Lindholm		Abbetvedvej 2A, 4000 Roskilde	c. 1730	Manor house from c. 1730
Lindholm		Abbetvedvej 2B, 4000 Roskilde		Godsforvalterboligen: Residence for the estate manager

=== 4060 Kirke Såby ===
Name	Image	Location	Coordinates	Description
Frihedsstøtten, Kirke Såby		Landevejen 105, 4060 Kirke Såby	55°38′41.5″N 11°51′59.94″E	Sandstone memorial from 1794 designed by ohannes Wiedewelt
Trudsholm		Hvalsøvej 16, 4060 Kirke Såby		Manor house dating from 1551 but adapted in 1874

=== 4070 Kirke Hyllinge ===
Name	Image	Location	Coordinates	Description
Egholm		Trehøjevej 45, 4070 Kirke Hyllinge	55°43′58.4″N 11°54′44.68″E	Manor house from 1824
Egholm		Trehøjevej 45, 4070 Kirke Hyllinge	55°43′58.4″N 11°54′44.68″E	Gatehouse from 1870
Egholm		Trehøjevej 45, 4070 Kirke Hyllinge	55°43′58.4″N 11°54′44.68″E	Barn from c. 1880
Egholm		Trehøjevej 45, 4070 Kirke Hyllinge	55°43′58.4″N 11°54′44.68″E	Two-winged stables building from c. 1890
Egholm		Trehøjevej 45, 4070 Kirke Hyllinge	55°43′58.4″N 11°54′44.68″E	Hesteomgang
Gershøjvej 110-112		Gershøjvej 110, 4070 Kirke Hyllinge	55°43′5.95″N 11°58′39.47″E	23-bay, half-timbered house probably dating from the 16th century
Gershøjvej 110-112		Gershøjvej 112, 4070 Kirke Hyllinge	55°43′5.99″N 11°58′37.27″E	23-bay, half-timbered house probably dating from the 16th century
Hyrdehuset		Hornsherredvej 314, 4070 Kirke Hyllinge	55°41′19.9″N 11°57′2.27″E	Seven bay long, half-timbered building from c. 1750
Sæby Old School		Tingstedet 6, 4070 Kirke Hyllinge	55°42′18.94″N 11°56′39.91″E	School building from 1830
Sæby Rectory		Hornsherredvej 430, 4070 Kirke Hyllinge	c. 1730	Three-winged, half-timbered rectory from c. 1920 and the cobbled courtyard with its two trees and the low stone walls along the driveway
Sæby Rectory		Hornsherredvej 430, 4070 Kirke Hyllinge	c. 1730	Three-winged, half-timbered rectory from c. 1920 and the cobbled courtyard with its two trees and the low stone walls along the driveway

=== 4320 Lejre ===
Name	Image	Location	Coordinates	Description
Dellinge Watermill		Dellingevej 3, 4320 Lejre	55°36′1.84″N 11°56′49.7″E	Watermill from c. 1740
Dellinge Watermill		Dellingevej 3, 4320 Lejre	55°36′1.84″N 11°56′49.7″E	Stables wing located to the west of the main building
Hule Mill Farm		Kisserupvej 5, 4320 Lejre	55°35′43.44″N 11°55′43.44″E	Watermill
Gammel Kongsgård		Orehøjvej 12, 4320 Lejre	55°37′1.52″N 11°58′11.03″E	Thatched farmhouse from c. 1712 with an appendix from 1780 off its west side and a side wing from 1827 off its east side
Gammel Kongsgård		Orehøjvej 12, 4320 Lejre	55°37′1.52″N 11°58′11.03″E	Storage building in brick
Ledreborg		Ledreborg Alle 2A, 4320 Lejre	55°36′40.25″N 11°58′37.6″E	Main wing: The nine central bays date from c. but the building was expanded and adapted in the Baroque style by Johan Cornelius Krieger in 1744–45
Ledreborg		Ledreborg Alle 2A, 4320 Lejre	55°36′40.25″N 11°58′37.6″E	Gatehouse from
Ledreborg		Ledreborg Alle 2A, 4320 Lejre	55°36′40.25″N 11°58′37.6″E	West wing (stables)
Ledreborg		Ledreborg Alle 2E, 4320 Lejre	55°36′19.84″N 11°56′56.33″E	Western pavilion 1748-50 by Lauritz de Thurah
Ledreborg		Ledreborg Alle 2B, 4320 Lejre	55°36′22.57″N 11°57′3.49″E	East wing
Ledreborg		Ledreborg Alle 2A, 4320 Lejre	55°36′40.25″N 11°58′37.6″E	East pavilion from 1748 to 1750 by Lauritz de Thurah
Ledreborg: Granite bridges		Ledreborg Alle 2A, 4320 Lejre	55°36′40.25″N 11°58′37.6″E	Single-arched granite bridge from 1755 on the avenue
Ledreborg: Granite bridges		Ledreborg Alle 2A, 4320 Lejre	55°36′40.25″N 11°58′37.6″E	Tswo-arched granite bridge from 1755 on the avenue

=== 4330 Hvalsø ===
Name	Image	Location	Coordinates	Description
Tadre Watermill		Tadre Møllevej 23, 4330 Hvalsø	55°36′53.42″N 11°48′47.59″E	Watermill from c. 1740 with its mill wheel and all other fittings, an attached barn from 1874, canals, mill pond etc.

=== 4340 Tølløse ===
Name	Image	Location	Coordinates	Description
Aastrup		Aastrupvej 63, 4340 Tølløse	55°37′14.05″N 11°48′12.24″E	Manor house consisting of an east wing dating from 1613m a north wing probably from 1589 and a west wing from 1856 as well as the surrounding moats
