= List of watermills in Denmark =

This list of watermills in Denmark lists watermills in Denmark.

== Zealand ==
Name	Image	Address	Municipality	Stream	Notes
Blåbæk Mill		Blåbækvej 5, 4640 Faxe	Faxe	Blåbæk	Watermill from 1838. Listed in 1950.
Bregentved Mill		Moltkesvej 67, 4690 Haslev	Faxe		
St. Clare's Watermill		Havnevej 17A, 4000 Roskilde	Roskilde	Maglekilde	Residential wing from 1831. The watermill has been demolished. The surviving building was listed in 1980.
Dellinge Watermill		Dellingevej 3, 4320 Lejre	Lejre		Watermill from c. 1740. Listed in 1959.
Fiskebæk Mill			Næstved		Small farm mill from c. 1870
Holløse Mill			Næstved	Susåen	
Ellested Watermill; Frilandsmuseet		Kongevejen 100, 2800 Kongens Lyngby	Lyngby-Taarbæk		
Esrum Mill Farm		Klostergade 12A, 3230 Græsted	Gribskov	Esrum Å	
Figlevad Watermill		Møllevej 4, 2800 Kongens Lyngby	Lyngby-Taarbæk	Mølleåen	Watermill from 1879.
Hule Mill Farm		Kisserupvej 5, 4320 Lejre	Lejre		Æosted in 1984.
Lyngby Søndre Mølle		Lyngby Hovedgade 28, 2800 Kongens Lyngby	Lyngby-Taarbæk	Mølleåen	Watermill from 1903 designed by Valdemar and Bernhard Ingemann. Listed in 2012.
Nive Mill			Fredensborg	Isserød Å	
Raadvad Watermill		Taadvad, 2800 Kongens Lyngby	Lyngby-Taarbæk/Rudersdal	Mølleåen	
Strids Mølle		Åvej 2, 4470 Svebølle	Kalundborg	Halleby Å	
Tadre Watermill		Tadre Møllevej 23, 4330 Hvalsø	Lehre	Taderød Bæk	Watermill from c. 1840. Listed in 1959.

== Bornholm ==
Name	Image	Address	Municipality	Stream	Notes
Slusegården		Strandvejen 10, 3720 Aakirkeby	Bornholm		Watermill from c. 1800. Listed in 1960.
Vang Watermill		Vandmøllevej 8, 3790 Hasle	Bornholm	Ringe Bæk	Watermill from c. 1800. Listed in 1959.

== Funen ==
Name	Image	Address	Municipality	Stream	Notes
Slusegården		Arreskovvej 27, 5600 Faaborg	Faaborg-Midtfyn		Arreskov from c. 1750. Listed in 1990.
Egeskov Watermill		Grønnebjergvej 1A, 5772 Kværndrup	Faaborg-Midtfyn	Hågerup Mølleå	Watermill from 1855. Listed in 1959.
Grubbe Mill		Grubbemøllegyden 2, 5600 Faaborg	Faaborg-Midtfyn	Horne Å	Watermill from c. 1750. Listed in 1998.

== Jutland ==
Name	Image	Address	Municipality	Stream	Notes
Brundlund Slotsmølle			Aabenraa		
Bundsbæk Mill			Aabenraa		
Dorf Mill		Storskovvej 39, 9330 Dronninglund	Brønderslev		Watermill from the 1Sag: Dorf Vandmølle og Dorf Møllegård 9th century. Listed in 1999.
Fyrkat Mill		Fyrkatvej 45, 9500 Hobro	Mariagerfjord		Watermill from 1764 which was moved in 1961. Listed in 1954.
Godthåb Hammermølle		Zincksvej 1A, 9230 Svenstrup J	Aalborg		Listed in 2005.
Klostermølle			Skanderborg		
Moesgård Forest Mill		Skovmøllevej 51, 53, 8270 Højbjerg	Aarhus	Giber Å	Watermill from 1785 which was heightened in 1852. Listed in 1984.
Tarskov Mill Farm		Tarskovvej 1, 8462 Harlev J	Aarhus	Århus Å	Watermill from c. 1800. Listed in 1964.
