= Hule Mill Farm =

Watermill in Lejre, Denmark

- Jule Møllegård
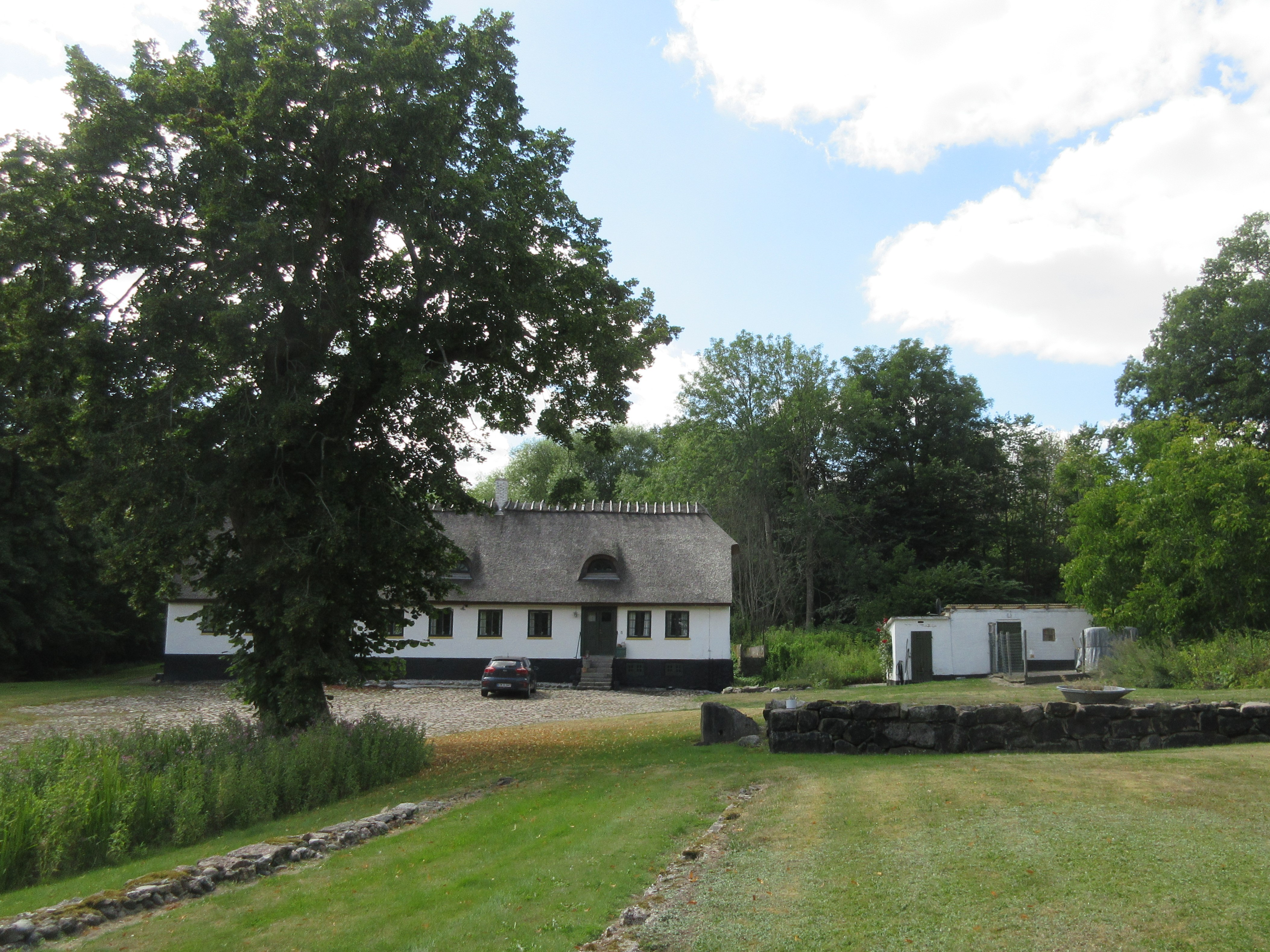
- Interactive map of the Hule Mill Farm area

General information
- Location: Lejre Municipality, Denmark
- Coordinates: 55°35′43″N 11°56′00″E

Hule Mill Farm (Danish: Hule Møllegård) is a watermill situated a few kilometres to the southwest of Ledreborg, in Lejre Municipality, some 30 kilometres west of Copenhagen, Denmark. It was powered by a tributary of Kornerup Å. The building was listed in the Danish registry of protected buildings and places in 1986.

== History ==
Hule Møllegård traces its history back to the beginning of the 18th century. It was originally a three-winged complex but two of the wings have been demolished.

== Architecture ==
The surviving main wing is built in brick with dressed, half-timbered gables. The hip roof is thatched with straw and has several thatched dormer windows.

The stream runs in a pipe under the cobbled yard in front of the building. The site also comprises a ditch and a bridge across the mill pond to the west of the building.

== See also ==
- List of watermills in Denmark
