= Overgaden Neden Vandet 31 =

18th-century canal house in central Copenhagen, Denmark

Overgaden Neden Candet 31
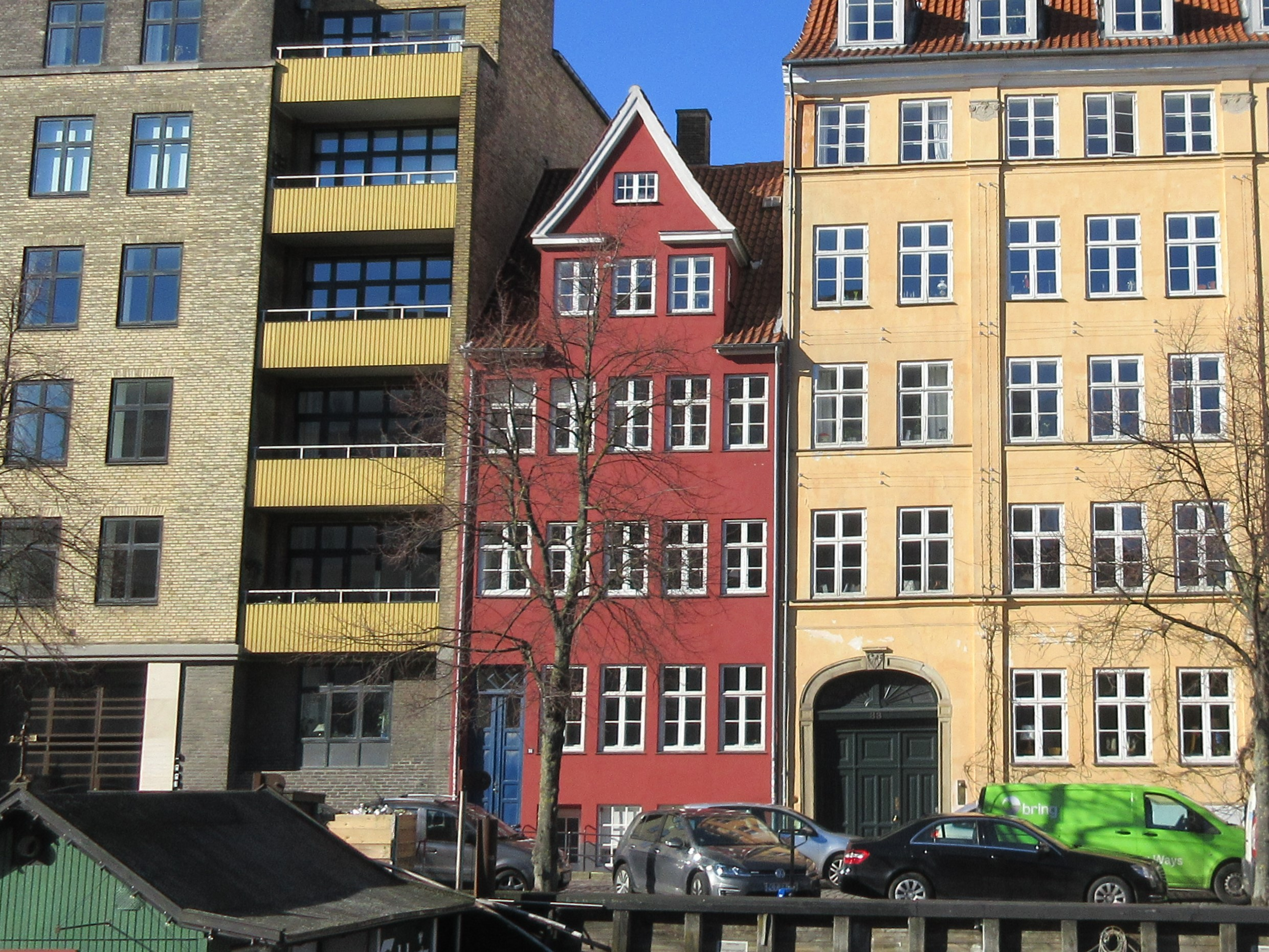
- Interactive map of the Overgaden Neden Candet 31 area

General information
- Location: Copenhagen, Denmark
- Coordinates: 55°40′23.16″N 12°35′28.46″E
- Completed: 18th century
- Renovated: i 1967-71

Overgaden Neden Vandet 31 is an 18th-century canal house overlooking Christianshavn Canal in the Christianshavn neighbourhood of central Copenhagen, Denmark. It was listed in the Danish registry of protected buildings and places in 1918.

== History ==
=== 17th century ===
The site was originally part of a much larger property which continued all the way to Kongensgade (now Wildersgade) on the other side of the block. In 1635, it was still empty. The property now known as Overgaden Neden Vandet 31 was turned into a separate property in 1658. The first building on the site was also constructed at this point. In 1695, it was described as a five-bays-wide, half-timbered building with a three-bay gabled wall dormer. The property was listed in Copenhagen's first cadastre from 1689 as No. 89 in Christianshavn Quarter. It was at that time owned by schoutbynacht Johan Eilersen.

=== 18th century ===
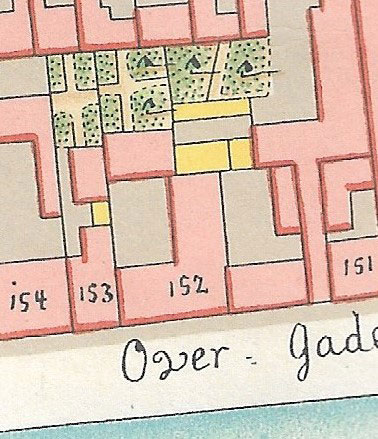
No.153 seen on a detail from Gedde's district map

In 1696, ship captain Anders Madsen purchased the property. In 1705, he was captain of the Danish West India Company's ship Kronprinsen, which picked up a cargo of 826 enslaved Africans at Fort Christiansborg on the Danish Gold Coast. The ship's powder magazine exploded on 31 May 1706, killing around 850 slaves and crewmembers. Madsen was among the casualties. Only five people survived the incident. His widow owned the property until 1713.

The property was listed in the new cadastre of 1756 as No. 153 in Christianshavn Quarter and was at that time owned by Johan Christian Høvi.

The building was later heightened with one storey. The half-timbered front side and rear side of the building were also reconstructed in brick.

=== Claussen and Bang families, 1763–1893 ===
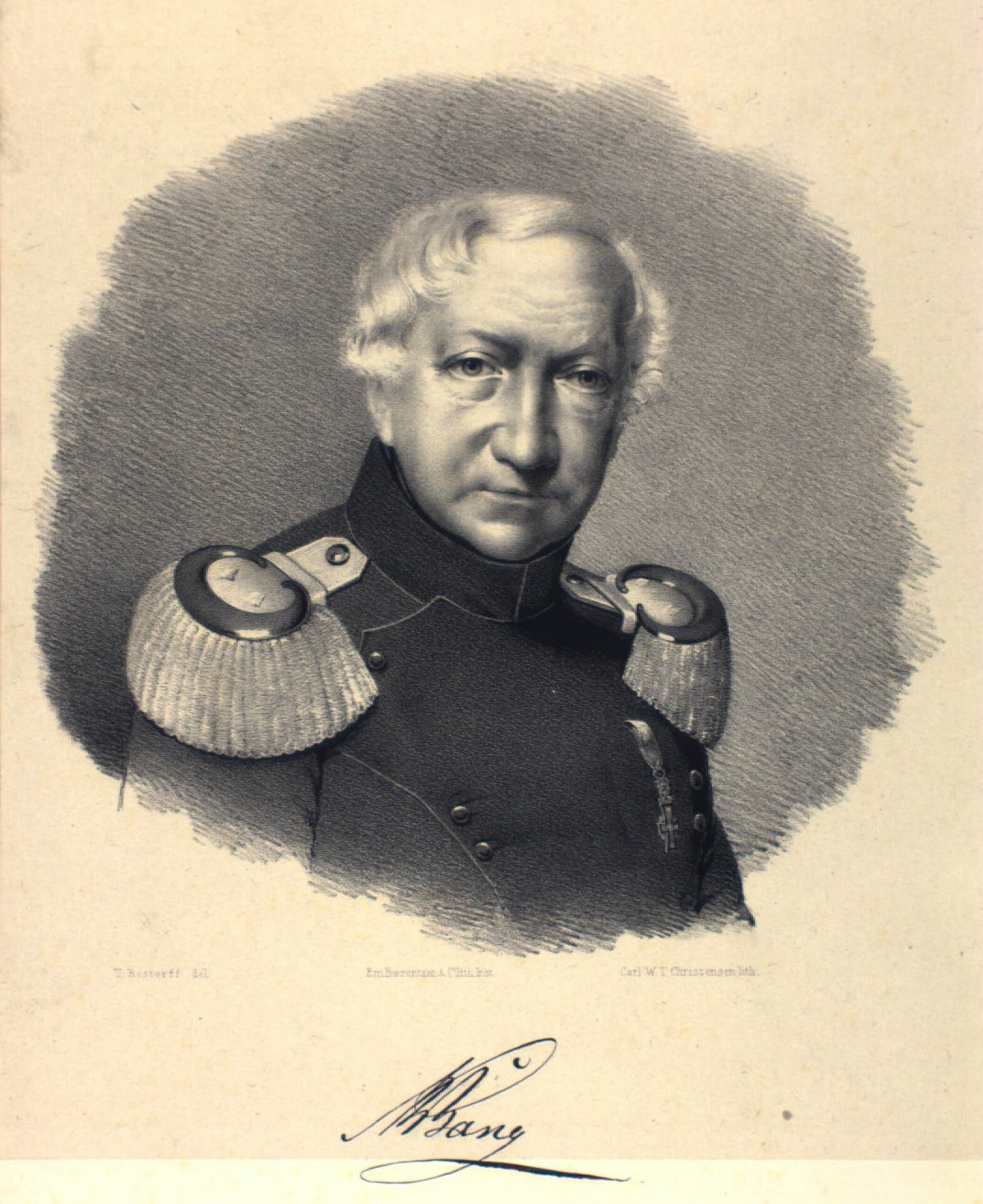
Niels Rohr Bang

On 12 December 1763, No. 153 was acquired by sailmaker Werner Clausen. It was after his death passed to his widow Bendite Clausen. Bendite Clausen resided in the building with one maid at the 1787 census. On 9 June 1809, it was ceded to their son Lauritz Clasen. Bang's son Lauritz Bang followed in his father's footsteps as a manufacturer of ship sails, flags and compasses. The family's property was home to 11 residents in a single household at the 1801 census. Lauritz Werner Clasen resided in the building with his third wife Sara Thomine Bøttger, five children from his two first marriages (aged 10 to 21), two sailmaker's apprentices and two maids. Classen's property was listed as No. 158 in the new cadastre of 1806.

On 18 December 1829, Niels Rohr Bang (1780–1849) purchased the building. He was active as a manufacturer of ship sails, flags and compasses. He was also active in the Civil Artillery with rank of commander. Bang's property was home to three households at the 1840 census. Niels Rohr Bang resided on the first and second floors with his seven children (aged 21 to 35). Marie Svendsholm, a barkeeper, resided on the ground floor with one maid. Rasmus Larsen, a night watch at Krøyers Plads, resided in the basement with his wife Marie Lassen.

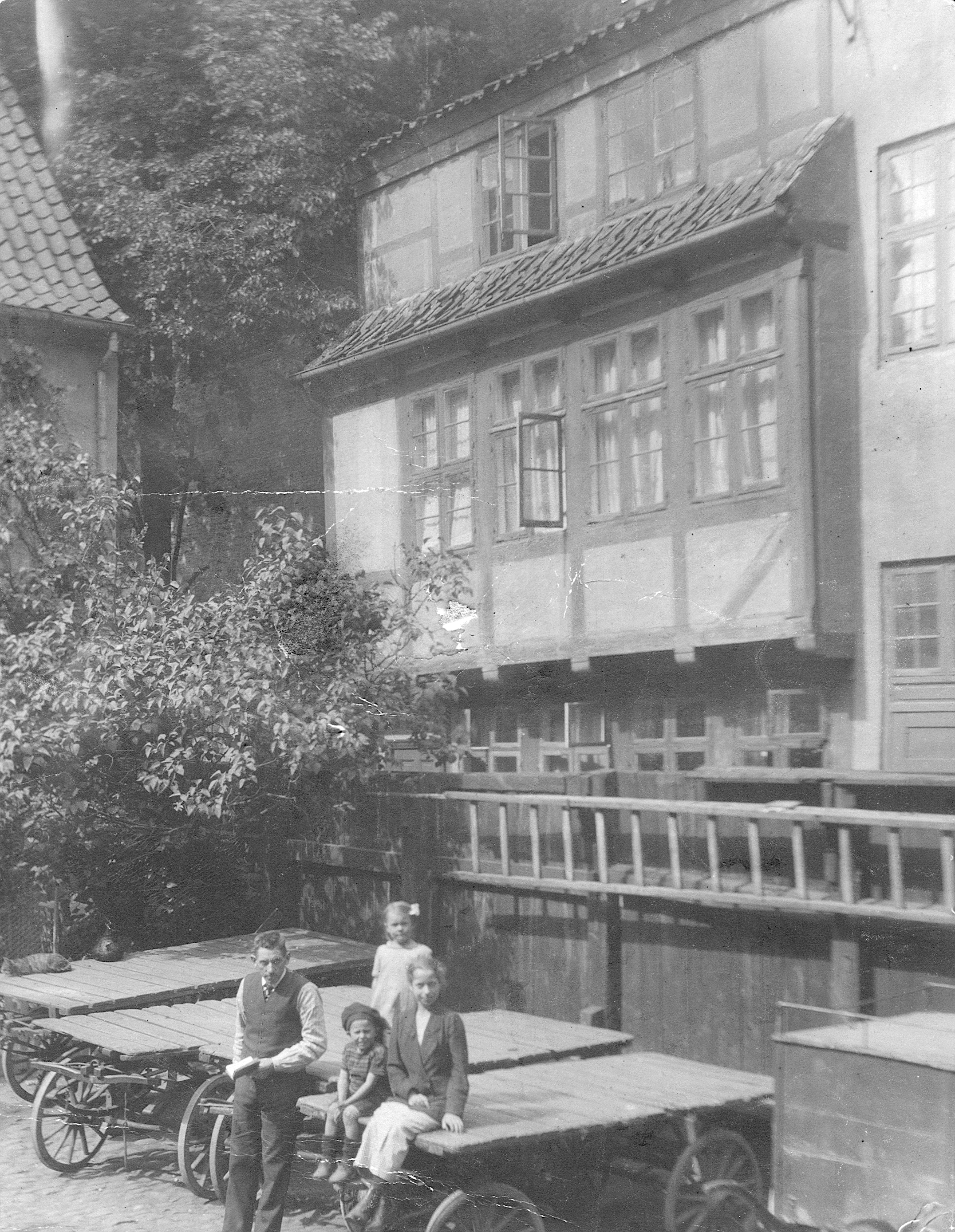
Children in the courtyard

After Niels Rohr Bang's death, on 24 December 1849, No. 158 was initially sold to railway conductor Christian Wilhelm Christensen. On 24 October 1853, it was acquired by one of Niels Rohr Bang's sons, Lauritz Bang (1805–1887), who had by then himself been licensed as a sailmaker. The building fronting the street was home to 17 residents in four households at the 1860 census. Lauritz Struch Bang resided on the first floor with his sister Marie Sophie Frederikke Bangand one maid. Cathrine Elisabeth Müller, widow of a bookkeeper, resided on the ground floor with her daughter Johanne Cathrine Elisabeth Müller, her son Peter Hendrich Müller and the lodger Jacob Peter Christian Stephansen (student). Heinrich Andreas Cornelius Cardel, a workman, resided in the basement with his wife Hansine Wilhelmine Cardel and their three children (aged one to five). Jørgen Poulsen, another workman, resided in the basement with his wife Fritzine Rudolphine Poulsen and their three daughters (aged 14 to 19). The rear wing was home to six more residents in two households. Margrethe Falk, widow of a ship cook, now employed with needlework, resided on the ground floor of the rear wing with her two children (aged one and three) and her brother Johannes Fal (dyer). Niels Michael Olsen, a workman, resided on the first floor of the rear wing with his wife Berthe Marie Olsen.

=== Later history ===
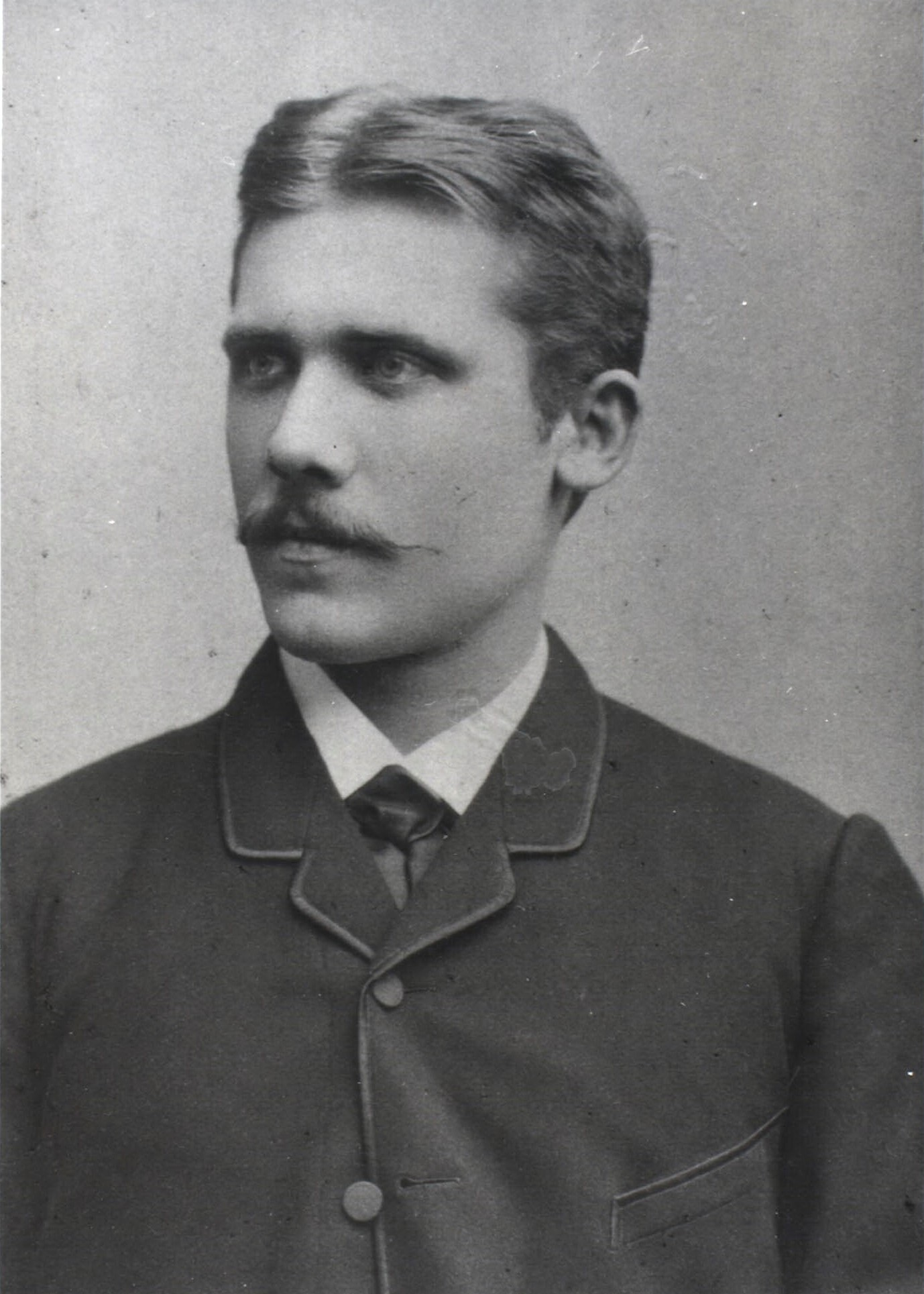
Axel Guthmann

The property was after Lauritz Bang's death passed to his sister Marie Sophie Frederikke Bang. On 13 February 1893, it was acquired by lawyer Axel Güthmann (1862–1916). He was born at Tadre Watermill as the son of the local miller. He later worked as a journalist before earning his law degree in 1887. On 23 December 1890, he was licensed as a High Court Attorney and started his own law firm. He was involved in a number of construction projects. Together with Anthon Melbye, he also published a book on Tivoli (Ernst Bojesens Forlag, 1884). Güthmann did not live in the building. He lived in an apartment in Malmøgade at the time of the 1901 census.

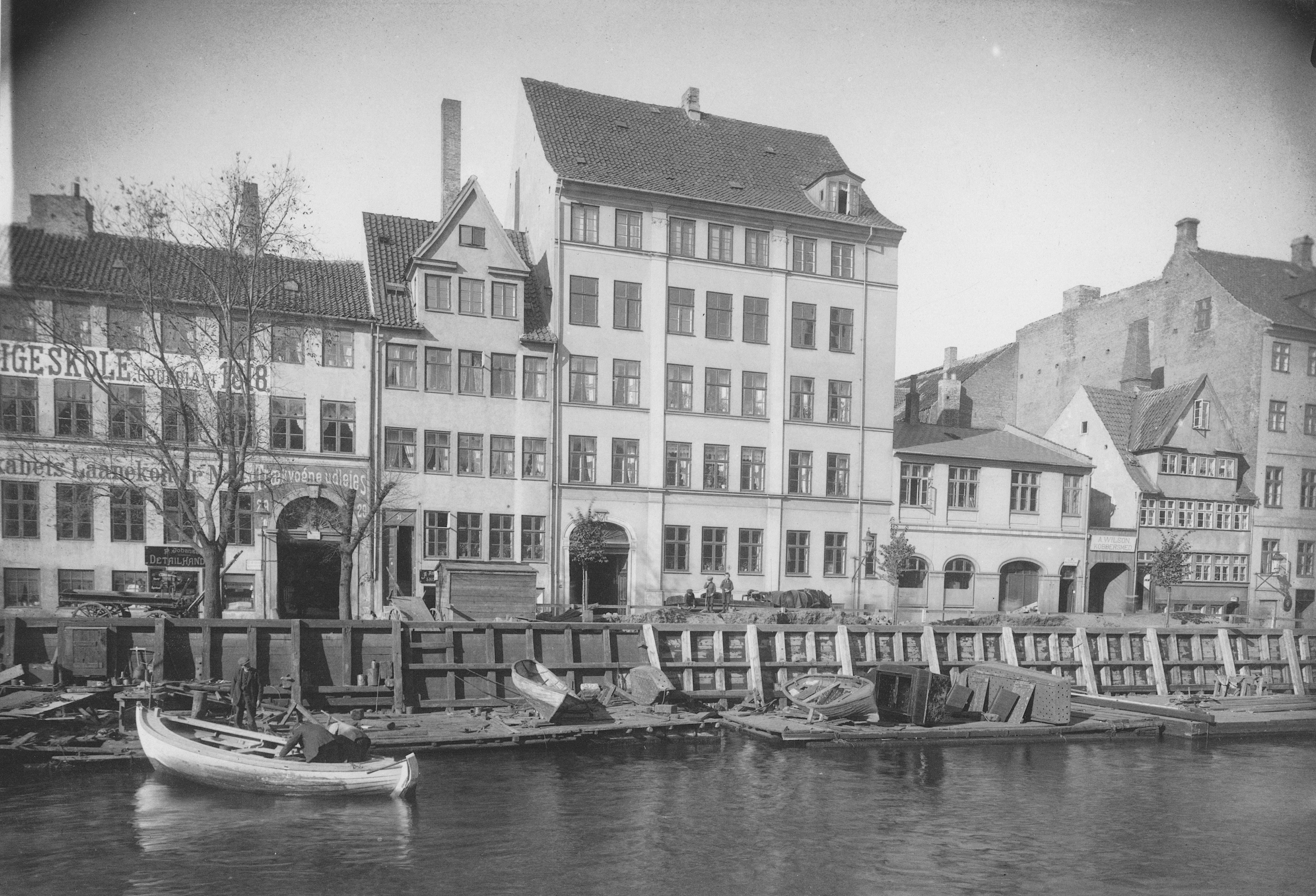
The building photographed by Kristian Hude in 1911

On 27 June 1904, Güthmann sold the property to master in forest science G. Hauberg. On 16 September 1906, he sold it to businessman (grosserer) A. F. Andersen. He was already the owner of the adjacent building Overgaden Neden Vamdet 33. He was the owner of William Andersen & Co., a wholesale company established back in 1845 by his grandfather Andreas Will. Andersen (1812–1885). In 1872, it was ceded to his son William Andersen (1844–1897). It was after his death continued by his widow Eleanor Caroline Andersen (1849-) and son Andreas Frederik Andersen (1870-). The company was headquartered at Overgaden Neden Vandet 33 (1910).

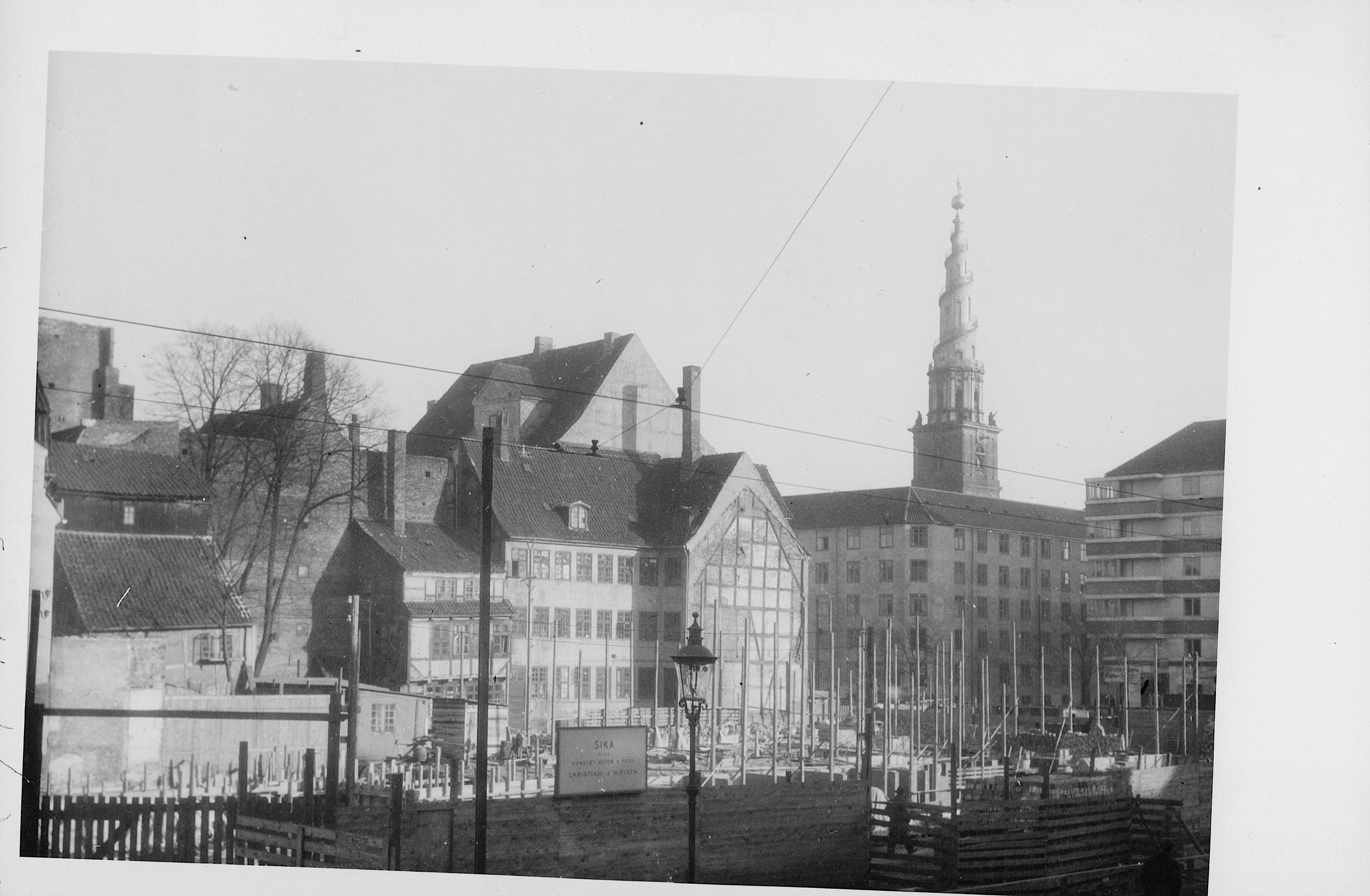
The exposed gable of No. 31 viewed from Torvegade with the cleared site of No. 25–29 in the foreground

On 17 July 1911, Andersen sold the buildings to the tea wholesale company David Metz. The company was founded by David Metz (1857–1947). It was still based at Overgaden Neden Vandet 33 in 1950.

The buildings to the left of No. 31 (No. 26 – 29) were all demolished when Rorvegade was widened in the mid-1920s. In 1927–1933, the remaining part of the cleared site was used for the construction of a Modernist housing estate designed by Bent Helweg-Møller.

A shoemaker's workshop was for a while located in the basement. In 1967-7o, S. A. Christensen & M. Anthon was responsible for undertaking a renovation of the building. One of two six-bay consecutive side wings were in this connection demolished and the other one was shortened to two bays. The renovation received an award from the city of Copenhagen in 1971.

== Architecture ==
Overgaden Neden Vandet 31 is constructed with three storeys over a walk-out basement. The five-bays-wide facade is plastered and red-painted, with white-painted window frames and a white-painted cornice. It is crowned by a three-bay gabled wall dormer, whose gable is also finished by a white-painted cornice with cornice returns. The pitched roof is clad in red tile. The roof ridge is pierced by a chimney. A two-bays-long side extends from the rear side of the building. It is integrated with the front wing via a canted corner bay. The side wing is topped by a monopitched red tile roof.

== Today ==
The building is owned by Steen Olaf Toftebjerg, an engineer and CEO of Næstved-based Hansen & Andersen.
