= Øm =

Øm may refer to:

- Øm (village), in Lejre Municipality, Denmark
- Øm Abbey, an old monastery (now ruins) in central Jutland, Denmark
