= Gershøj =

- Town
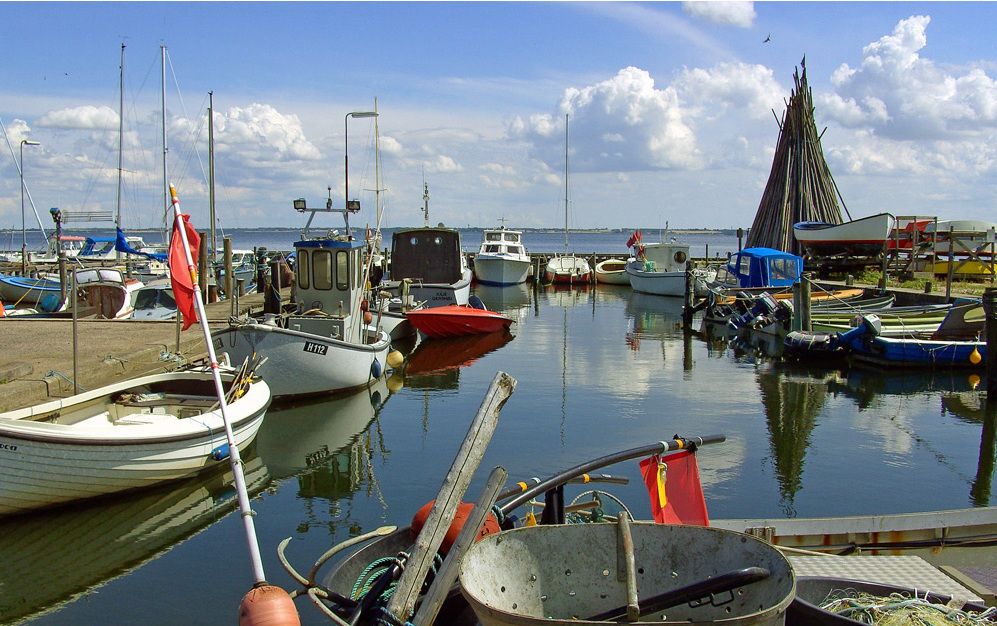
- Gershøj Harbour

- Location in Denmark Gershøj (Denmark)
- Coordinates: 55°42′50″N 11°58′6″E
- Country: Denmark
- Region: Region Zealand
- Municipality: Lejre Municipality

Population (2026)
  - Total: 688

Gershøj is a small coastal town, with a population of 688 (1 January 2026), in Lejre Municipality, Region Zealand in Denmark. It is situated on the Hornsherred peninsula, on the western shore of Roskilde Fjord, 6 km east of Kirke Hyllinge and 6 km south of Skibby.

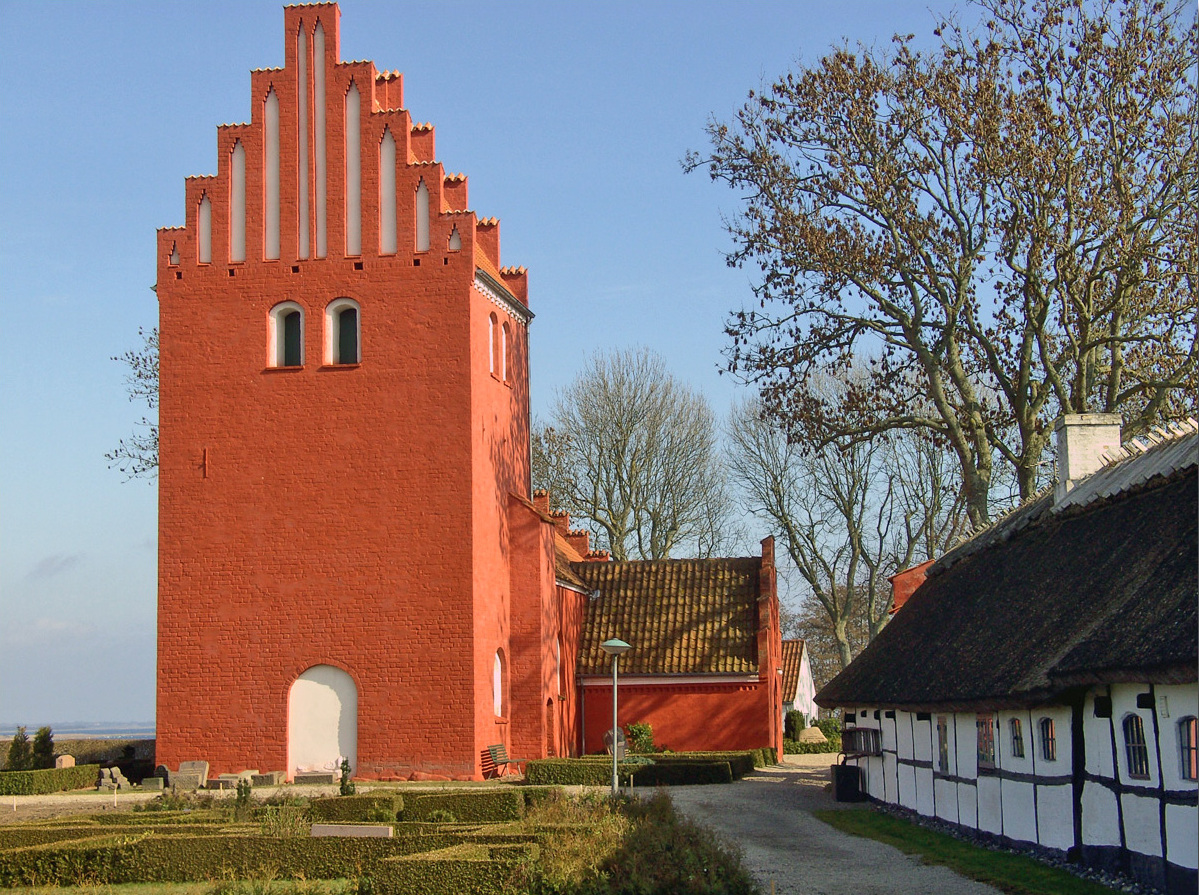
Gershøj Church

Gershøj Church is located on the northern outskirts of the town.

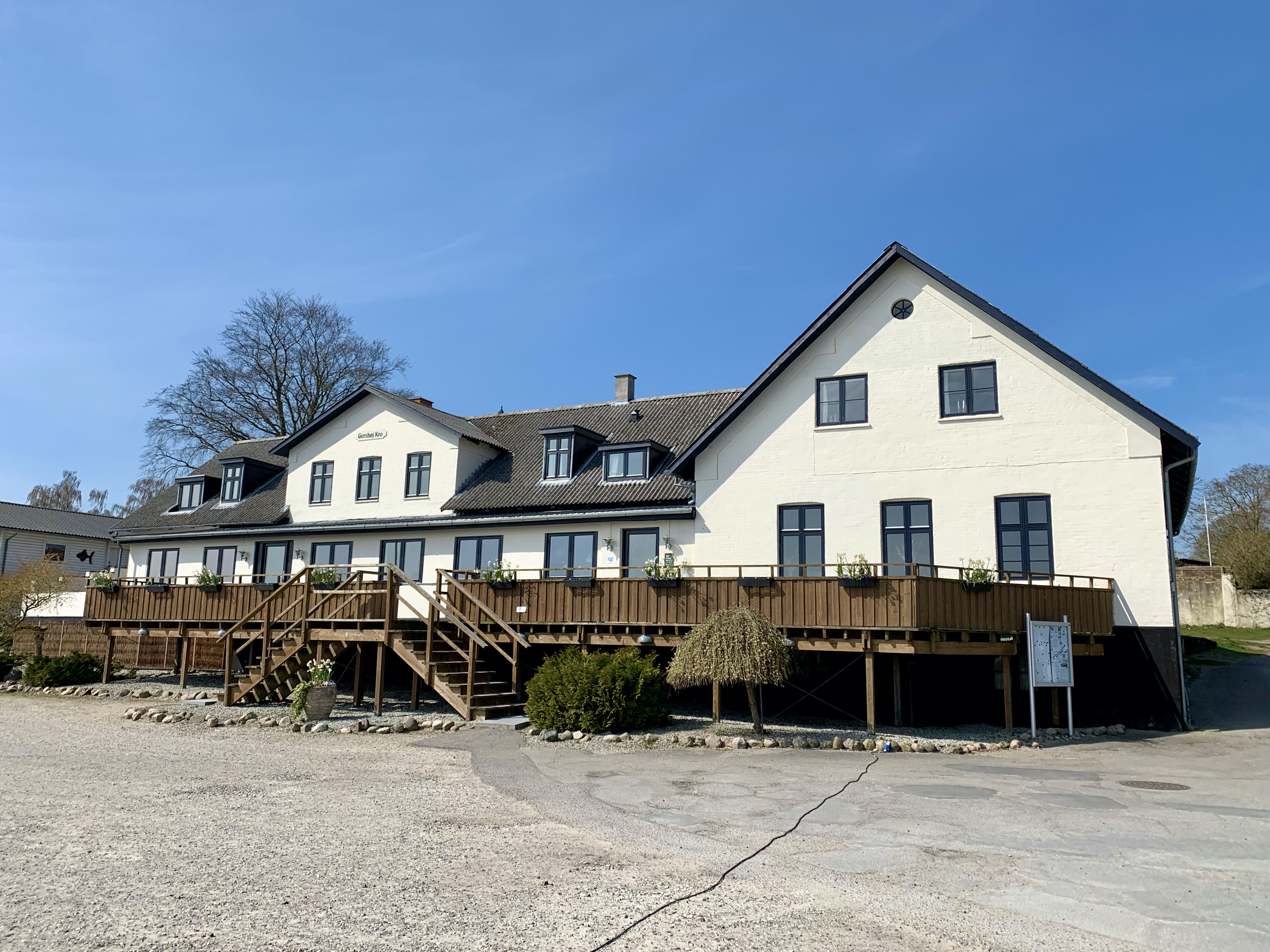
Gershøj Kro (Gershøj Inn)

Gershøj Kro (Gershøj Inn), dating back to the early 1900s, is located at the small Gershøj Harbour overlooking Roskilde Fjord.
