= Aagaard (manor house) =

Danish manor house

- Interactive map of the Aagaard area

General information
- Location: Ågårdsvej 11B, 4281 Gørlev, Denmark
- Coordinates: 55°33′32.22″N 11°12′40.61″E
- Completed: 1805 (south wing and central part of the main wing)

Aagaard is a manor house and estate located at Gørlev, Kalundborg Municipality, 100 kilometres west of Copenhagen, Denmark. It was established in 1660 by treasurer Henrik Müller and has since 1865 been owned by members of the Hellemann family. The main building was listed on the Danish registry of protected buildings and places in 1945.

== History ==
In the late 16th century, Aagaardene (plural; lit. 'The Stream Farms') was the name of a little village, consisting of four farms and a mill, named for its location adjacent to the stream Halleby Å.

=== Müller and Fincke families ===
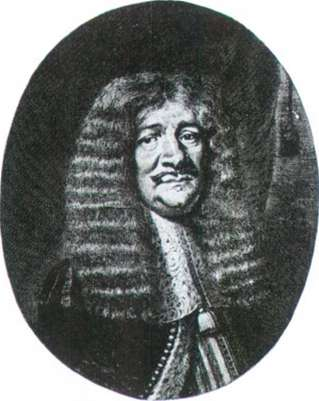
Henrik Müller by Albert Haelwegh

In 1660–1661, Henrik Müller, who served as royal treasurer, was given all crown land in Dragsholm and Sæbygård counties by Frederik III as partial repayment for his extensive loans to the crown during the Second Northern War.

In 1660, Müller was granted royal permission to shot down the village of Ågårdene. Two of the farms were converted into a new manor under the name Ågård. Müller expanded the estate with a farm that had previously belonged to nearby Ågerup. The rest of the land was placed under Sæbygaard, another manor owned by Müller.

The estate Lejregaard was also established by Müller. In conjunction with his daughter Drude Müller's wedding to Thomas Fincke, a Supreme Court justice and director of the Danish Asiatic Company, Müller presented Aagaard and Ledregaard to his new son-in-law. Fincke was later appointed as county governor of Bornholm and died in a riding accident at Hammershus in 1677. Aagaard was therefore passed on to their son Henrik von Fincke. His widow, Karen Gyldensparre, ceded it to their son-in-law Rasmus Melvin, the owner of Nørager.

=== Changing owners, 1705–1808 ===
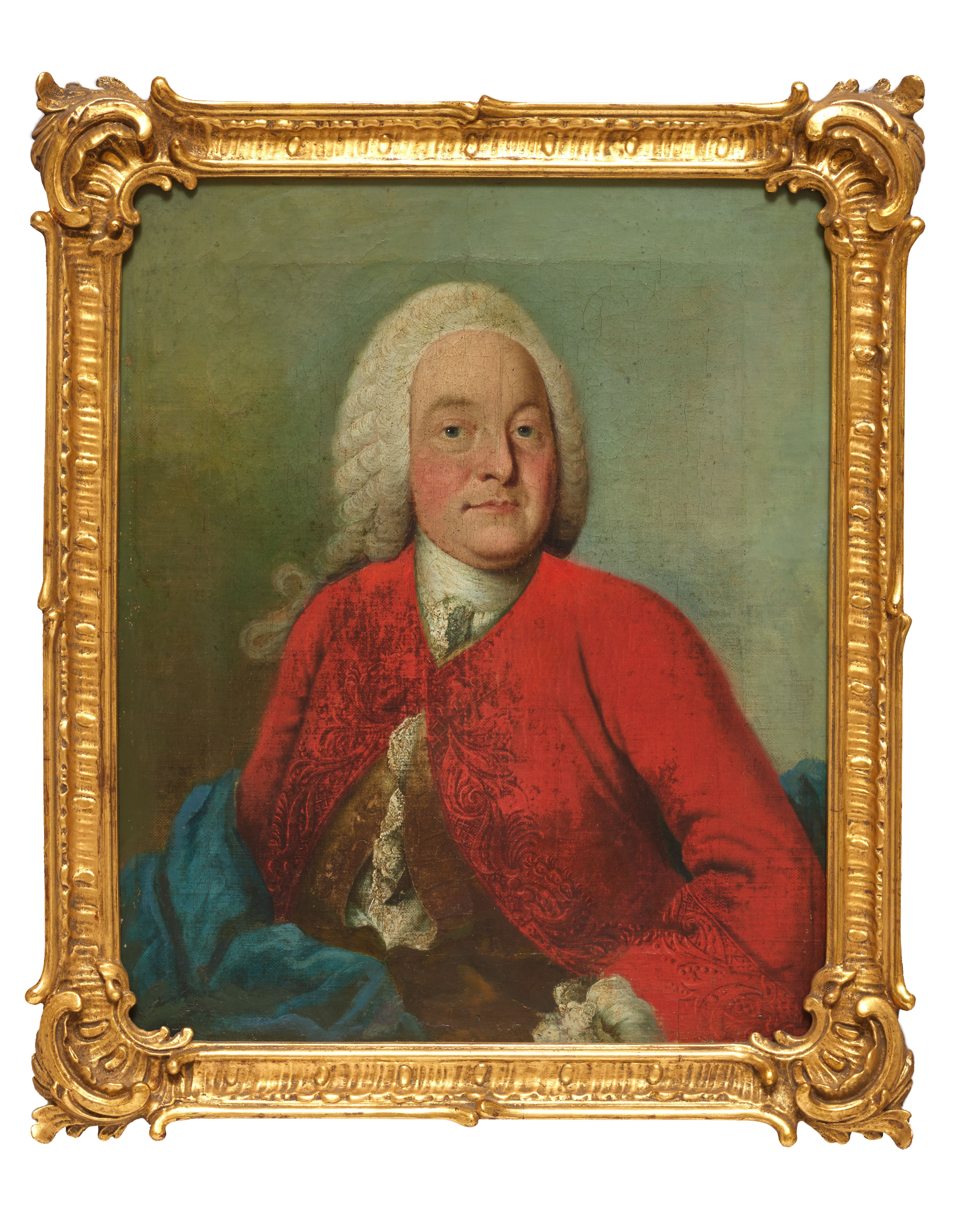
William Lorentz Williamsen Hammond

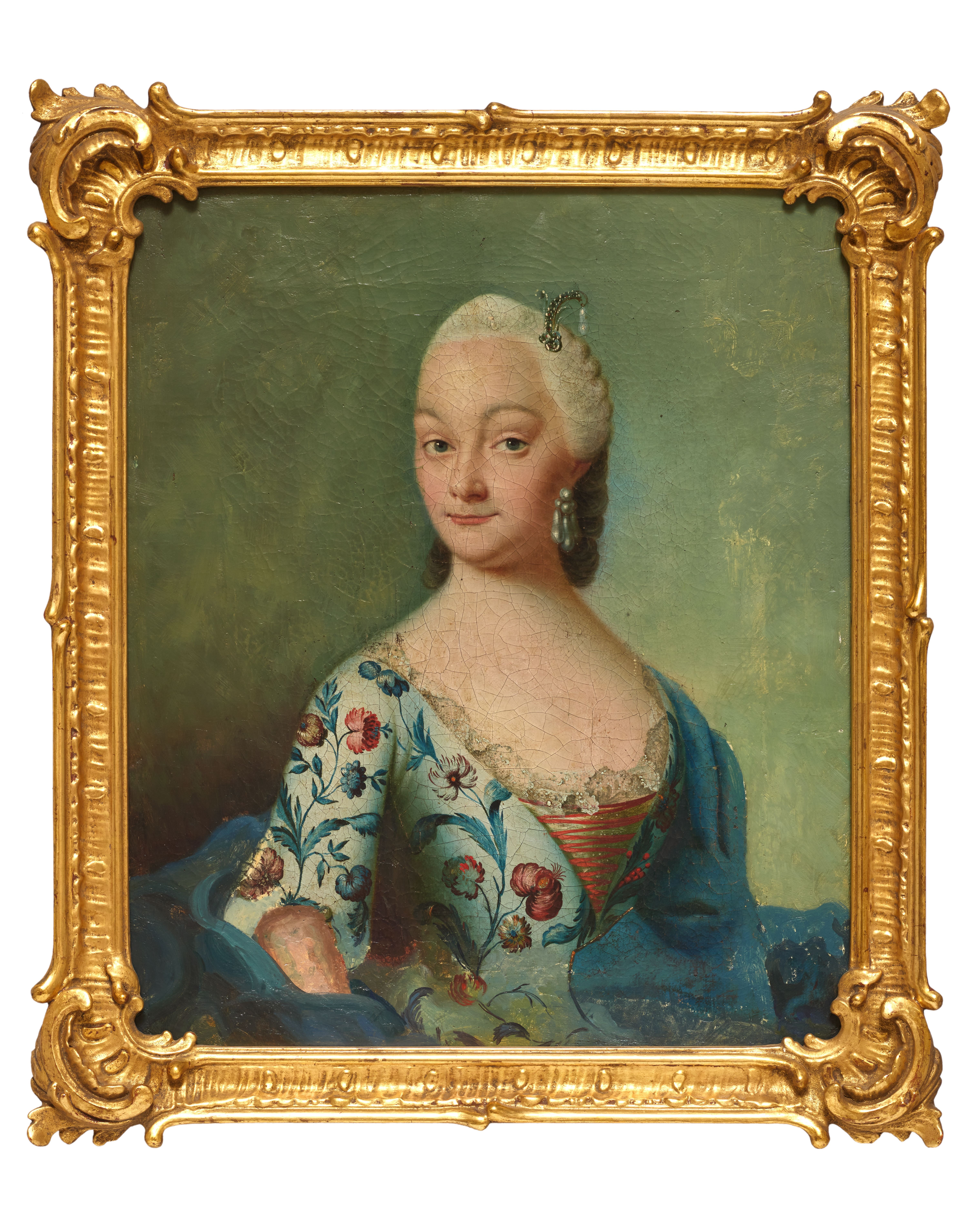
Charlotte Hammond, néeHagerup

In 1721, Melvin sold Aagaard to Lars Benzon. In 1725 Benzon sold the estate to his brother, Jacob Benzon, who would later become Governor-General of Norway. A third brother, Peder Benzon, became the owner of the estate in 1731.

After Peder Benszon's death, Aagaard was sold at auction to Major-General Peter Scavenius for 18,000 Danish rigsdaler. His widow, Helle Benzon, a more distant relative of the previous owners, kept the estate after his death two years later.

In 1753, Aagaard was acquired by the Norwegian merchant William Hammond for 30,000 rigsdaler. Hammond was born in Trondheim as the son of English-born merchant Walliam Hammond Sr.. He was married to Lovise Charlotte Hagerup, daughter of Bishop of Trondheim Eiler Hansen Hagerup.

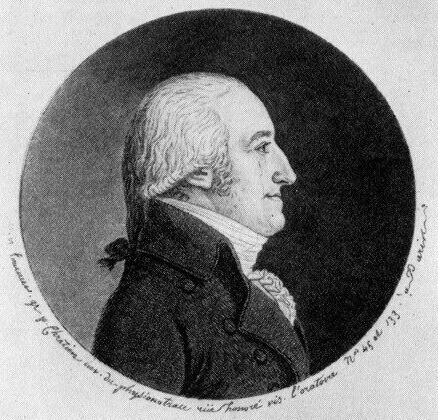
Pierre Paul Ferdinand Mourier.

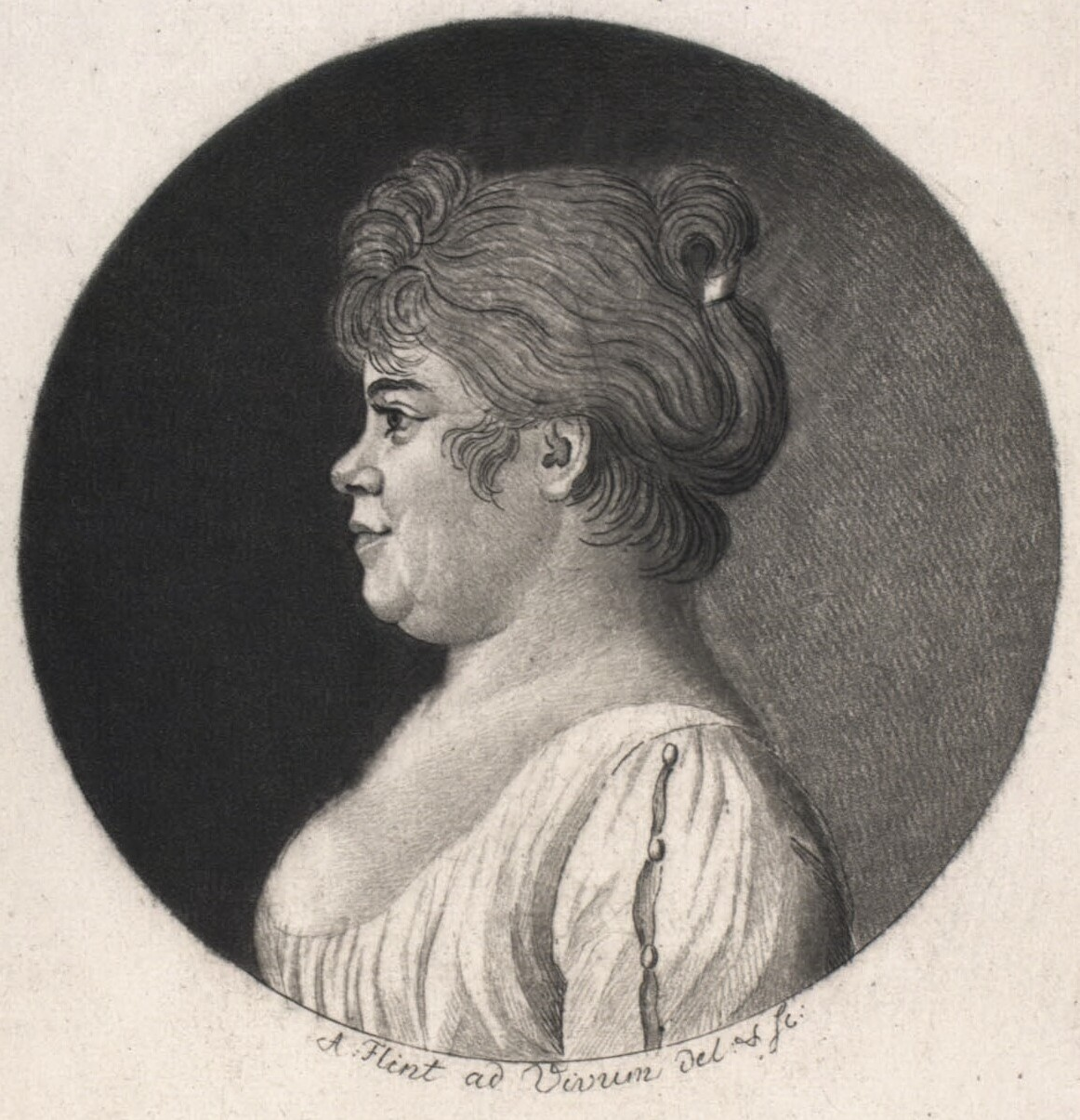
Frederikke Christiane Mourier, née Herbst

In 1762, Aagaard was acquired by kommerceråd Hans Lindholm for 52,000 rigsdaler. Lindholm was already the owner of the estate Jerstrup. In 1781, Lindholm sold the estate for 59,750 rigsdaler to Christian Linddam.

Pierre Paul Ferdinand Mourier purchased Aagaard for 70,000 rigsdaler in 1787. He had a background as a naval officer but had more recently worked for the Danish Asiatic Company in Canton. After his return to Denmark in 1785, he had been appointed as member of fabriksdirektionen, a subcommittee of the Commercial College (Kommerskollegiet), tasked with improving the productivity of the royal manufacturies. He now retired to his estate where he improved the management of the estate considerably and expanded it with the farm Søgaard.

On 18 December 1796, Mourier sold Aagaard for 112,500 Danish rigsdaler and moved back to Copenhagen. He then acquired Bjerregaarden in Valby and nearby farms. The new owner of Aagaard was Chancellery secretary Iver Qvistgaard.

=== The Moltke family ===
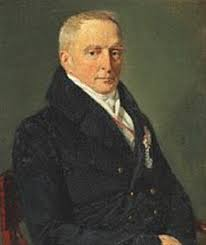
Carl Emil Moltke

On 20 December 1803, Qvistgaard sold Aagaard for 165,000 rigsdaler to Bjelke and Joachim Moltke for 165,000 rigsdaler. Carl Emil Moltke acquired it the following year. He had embarked on a career in the diplomacy and therefore spent most of his time abroad, serving as Danish envoy in Stockholm, the Hague and London, but settled on the estate after his retirement from diplomacy in 1822. He bought Nørager in 1837 and spent most of his time on his second estate during the last part of his year. He was a member of Roskilde Provincial Assembly (Danish: Roskilde Stænderforsamling) in 1835-46.

Carl Emil Moltke's son, Ernst Moltke, an only child, inherited Aagaard, Nørager and Conradinelyst after his father in 1858. He, too, preferred Nørager to Aagaard.

=== The Hellemann family ===
Adam Georg Ernst Henrik Moltke transferred Aagaard's tenant farms to Nørager in 1865. Aagaard, Søgaard, a number of houses and the churches in Gørlev and Helsinge were sold to J. Hellemann. The estate is still owned by his descendants.

== Architecture ==
The main building is a three-winged, single-storey complex. Part of the south wing dates from 1605. The central wing has been lengthened several times. The north wing was built in 1911.

== List of owners ==
- Henrik Müller, 1660–
- Thomas Fincke, –1677
- Henrik von Fincke, 1677–1705
- Karen Gyldensparre, 1705–1711
- The estate of Karen Gyldensparre, 1711–1719
- R. Melvin, 1719–1721
- Lars Benzon , 1721–1725
- Jacob Benzon , 1725–1731
- Peder Benzon , 1731–1737
- Peder Scavenius, 1737–
- Helene Scavenius (née Benzon), –1753
- William Hammond, 1753–1762
- Hans Lindholm, 1762–1781
- Christian Linddam, 1781–1787
- Pierre Paul Ferdinand Mourier, 1787–1796
- Iver Qvistgaard, 1796–1803
- Bielke Moltke, 1803–1804
- Joachim Moltke, 1803–1804
- Carl Emil Moltke, 1804–1858
- Emil greve Moltke, 1858–1865
- J. Hellemann, 1865–1899
- Estate of J. Hellemann, 1899–1900
- Johannes Olsen, 1900–
- Enken efter Hellemann, gift Olsen, 1911
- J. Hellemann Olsen, 1911–1935
- Johannes Jørgen Hellemann Olsen, 1935–1968
- J. H. Hellemann Olsen, 1968–1996
- John Hellemann Olsen, 1996–2007
- Gregers John Hellemann, 2007–
