= Bramsnæs =

Former municipality in Denmark

Coordinates: 55°41′N 11°50′E

Until 1 January 2007, Bramsnæs was a municipality (Danish, kommune) in Roskilde County on the island of Zealand in East Denmark. The municipality, lying between Roskilde Fjord and Isefjord, covered an area of 80 km^{2}, and had a total population of 9,391 (2005). Its last mayor was Flemming Jensen, a member of the Venstre (Liberal Party) political party. The main town and the site of its municipal council was the town of Kirke Hyllinge. To the east is Roskilde Fjord and to the west is Isefjord.

The municipality was created in 1970 as the result of a kommunalreform ("Municipality Reform") that combined the following parishes: Gershøj, Hyllinge, Lyndby, Rye, Sonnerup, and Sæby parish.

Bramsnæs municipality ceased to exist as the result of Kommunalreformen ("The Municipality Reform" of 2007). It was merged with Hvalsø and Lejre municipalities to form the new Lejre municipality. This created a municipality with an area of 240 km^{2} and a total population of 25,971 (2005). The new municipality belongs to the Region Sjælland ("Zealand Region").

Danish-American Islam scholar Patricia Crone (born 1945) is a native of Kyndeløse Sydmark, Rye Parish.
