= I.C. Møllerparken =

Recreational park in Esbjerg, Denmark

Coordinates: 55.468844°N 8.449041°E

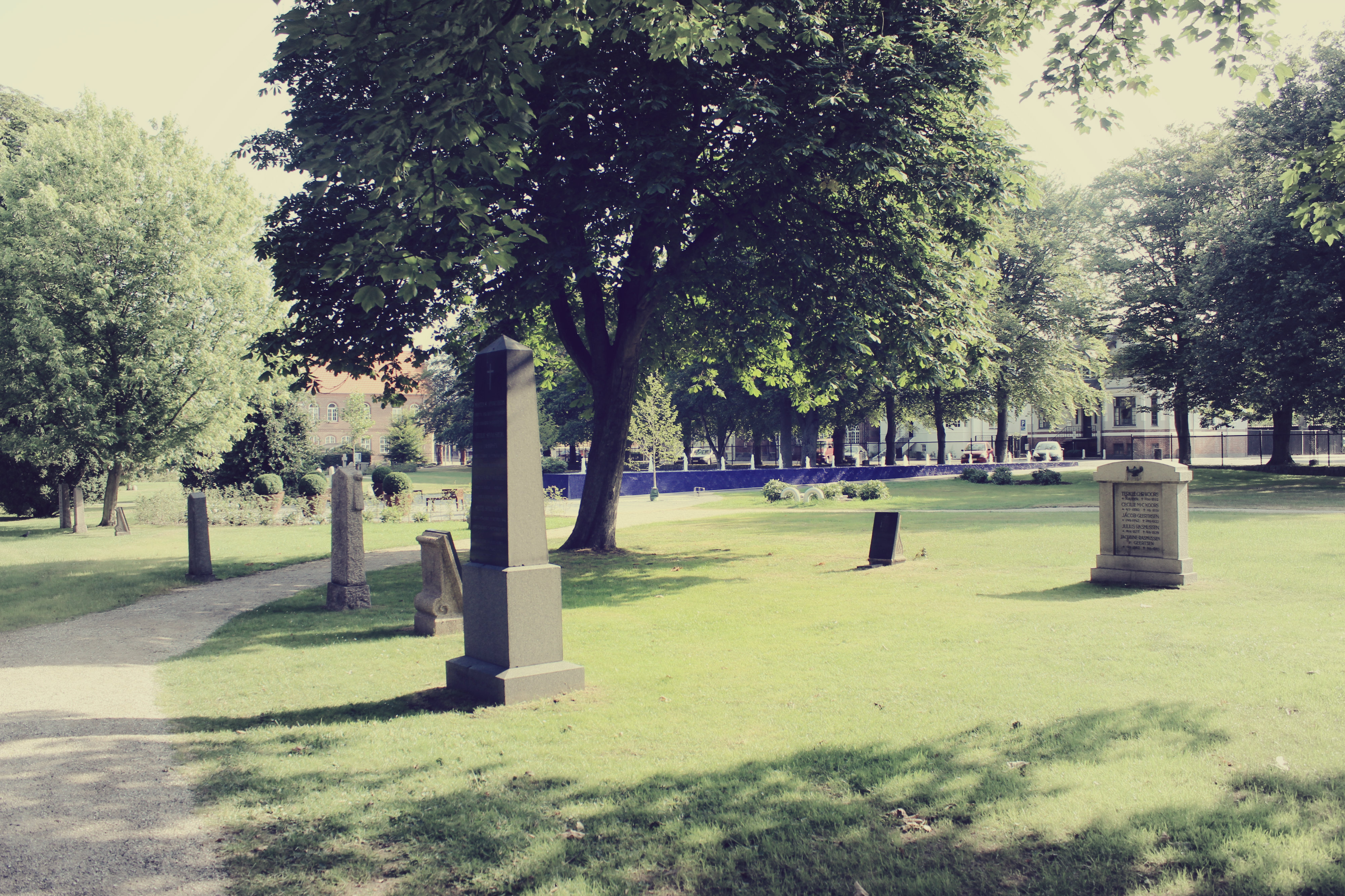
A view of I.C. Møllerparken

I.C. Møllerparken is a recreational park located in central Esbjerg, Denmark. It covers the space of Esbjerg's first cemetery, belonging to Church of Our Saviour, which since 2005 has been disused for burials.

In 2012 and 2013 the cemetery was renovated for DKK 5,000,000 and transformed into a recreational park which was opened for the public on 21 June 2013. The renovation preserved most tombstones, some of which belongs to notable pioneers in the early history of Esbjerg. The park is named after one of these, namely Jens Christian Møller who was the founder and director of A/S I C Møller the company which built and operated the first cold store warehouse for use by the fish industry.

Despite its official name being I.C. Møllerparken, it is still mostly referred to by locals as Den gamle Kirkegård (The old cemetery).
