= Dellinge Watermill =

Watermill in Lejre, Denmark

Coordinates: 55°36′02″N 11°56′50″E

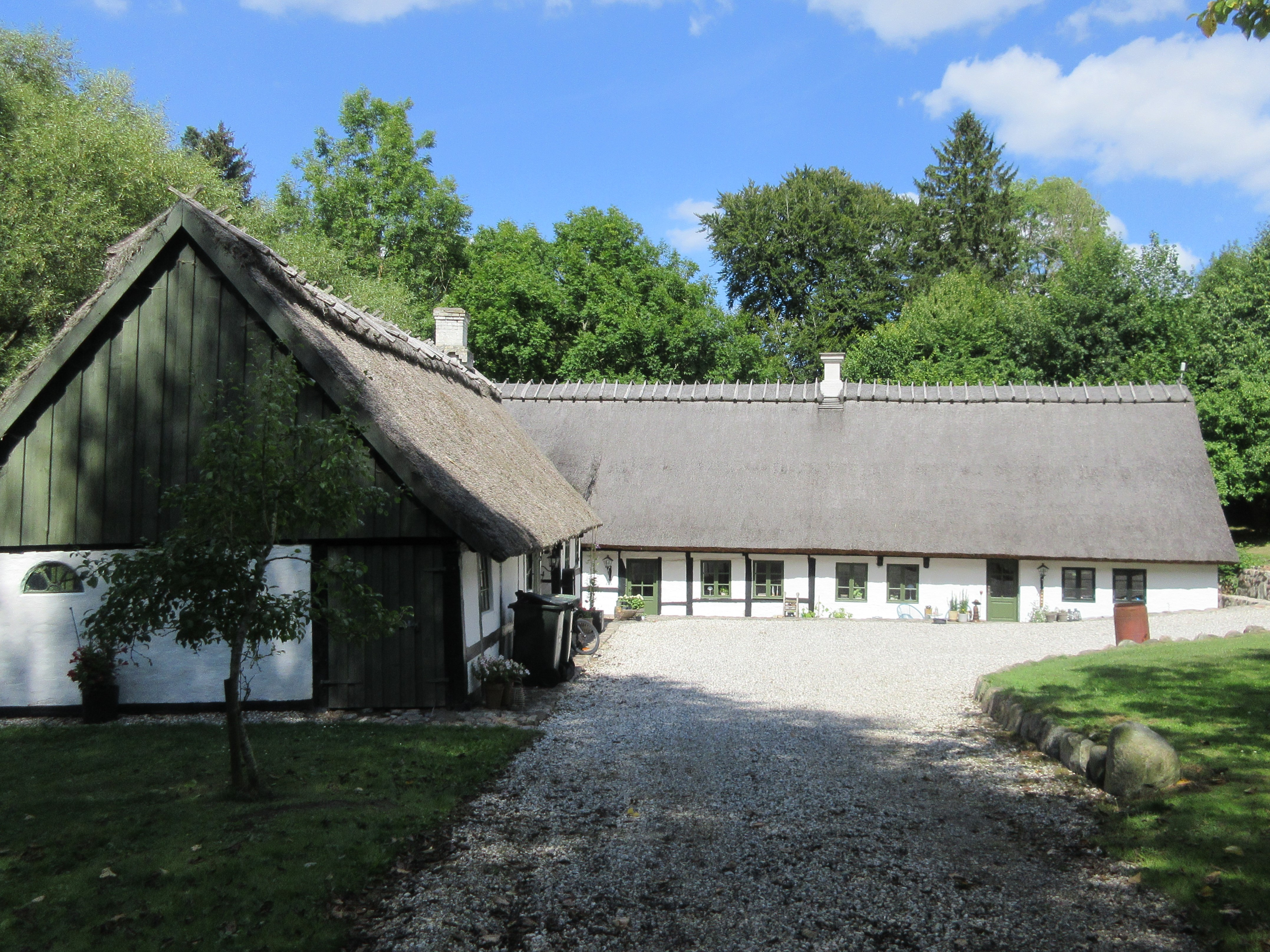
Dellinge Watermill

Dellinge Watermill is a watermill situated on the Ledreborg estate, in Lejre Municipality, some 30 kilometres west of Copenhagen, Denmark. It was powered by a tributary of Kornerup Å.

== History ==
Dellinge Watermill is mentioned for the first time in 1664. The current watermill was built as a grain mill in circa 1740.
