= Ejby, Lejre Municipality =

Ejby
- town
- Location in Denmark Ejby (Denmark Region Zealand)
- Coordinates: 55°41′25″N 11°50′58″E
- Country: Denmark
- Region: Region Zealand
- Municipality: Lejre Municipality

Area
  - Urban: 1.21 km^{2} (0.47 sq mi)

Population (2026)
  - Urban: 1,964
  - Urban density: 1,620/km^{2} (4,200/sq mi)
- Time zone: UTC+1 (CET)
  - Summer (DST): UTC+2 (CEST)
- Postal code: DK-4070 Kirke Hyllinge

Ejby is a town with a population of 1,964 (1 January 2026) in Lejre Municipality, Region Zealand in Denmark. The town was largely parcelled out from the main farms, Bigården and Præstholmgård.

The town has a small harbour and a sailing club. There's a school (Bramsnæsvigskolen) and a gymnasium supporting football, badminton, fitness, and handball.

== Geography ==
Ejby is situated at the base of Hornsherred, on the southwestern corner of the peninsula, near the southeastern shore of the Isefjord between Holbæk and Roskilde.

Ejby Ådal (Ejby River Valley) is located between Ejby and Kyndeløse Sydmark just north of the town, along the banks of Ejby Å (Ejby Creek) where it empties into the Isefjord.

To the South, a large forest area stretches to Elverdamsvejen (Elverdam road). The forest is the property of Earl Frederik August Rosenkrantz Scheel and the manor house Ryegård.

== Notable people ==
- Helena Heuser (born 1996 in Ejby) a Danish model and beauty pageant titleholder, crowned Miss World Denmark 2016
- Søren Schaarup (born 1952 in Frederiksberg) a Danish sculptor.
- Mark Strudal (born 29th April 1968 in Glostrup) a Danish footballer. Mark Strudal moved to Ejby at the end of his football career.
