= Thomas Fincke (judge) =

Thomas Fincke (14 October 1632 - September 1677) was a Danish Supreme Court justice, director of the Danish East India Company and county governor (amtmand) of Bornholm. He owned the estates Lejregård (now Ledreborg) and Aagaard. He was one of the judges who sentenced Peter Griffenfeld to death. He was the grandson of mathematician and physicist Thomas Fincke.

== Biography ==
Fincke was born on 14 October 1632 in Copenhagen, the son of Jacob Fincke (1592-1663) and Margrete Tetens (died 1637). His father was a professor at the University of Copenhagen. His paternal grandfather was Thomas Fincke. Three paternal aunts were also married to leading scientists of their time: Cathrine was married to the theologian Caspar Bartholin, Margrethe was married to the medical doctor and botanist Jørgen Fuiren, Dorothea was married to the historian Ole Worm and Drude was married to professor Hans Brochmand. Furthermore, Fincke's two sisters, Margrethe and Søster, were married to the professors Rasmus Vinding and Christen Ostenfeld, respectively.

Fincke matriculated from the University of Copenhagen in 1651. He then went on a Grand Tour, studying at the universities in Leiden (1653) and Padua (1657).

Fincke was married to Drude Müller (1644-1704) on 28 August 1660. She was the daughter of Royal Treasurer Henrik Müller (1609-92) and Sophie Hansdatter (1616-69). His father presented him with Lejregård and Aagaard. In addition to this, he was the owner of substantial property in Copenhagen.

In 1669, Fincke was appointed as a Supreme Court justice. In 1670, he was also appointed as one of the directors of the revived Danish East India Company. In 1674, together with his brother, Johan Fincke, a professor, he was ennobled. In 1676, he was appointed as county governor (amtmand) of Bornholm. In the same year, he was part of the commission that sentenced Peder Griffenfeld to death.

Fincke died in a riding accident at Hammershus in September 1677. He is buried at Allerslev Cemetery. Lejregård was passed down to Fincke's son Henrik Thomsen Fincke. It passed out of the family in 1712.
