= Kyndeløse Sydmark =

- Town
- Location in Region Zealand
- Coordinates: 55°42′31″N 11°50′50″E
- Country: Denmark
- Region: Region Zealand
- Municipality: Lejre Municipality

Population (2026)
  - Total: 555

Kyndeløse Sydmark is a small coastal and summerhouse town, with a population of 555 (1 January 2026), in Rye Parish, Lejre Municipality, Region Zealand in Denmark. It is located 3 km north of Ejby and 5 km west of Kirke Hyllinge.

Solbakken Camping is a naturist campsite located in the western part of the town, at the shore of the Isefjord.
