= Church of Our Saviour, Esbjerg =

Coordinates: 55°28′03″N 8°26′56″E

Church of Our Saviour
- Vor Frelsers Kirke
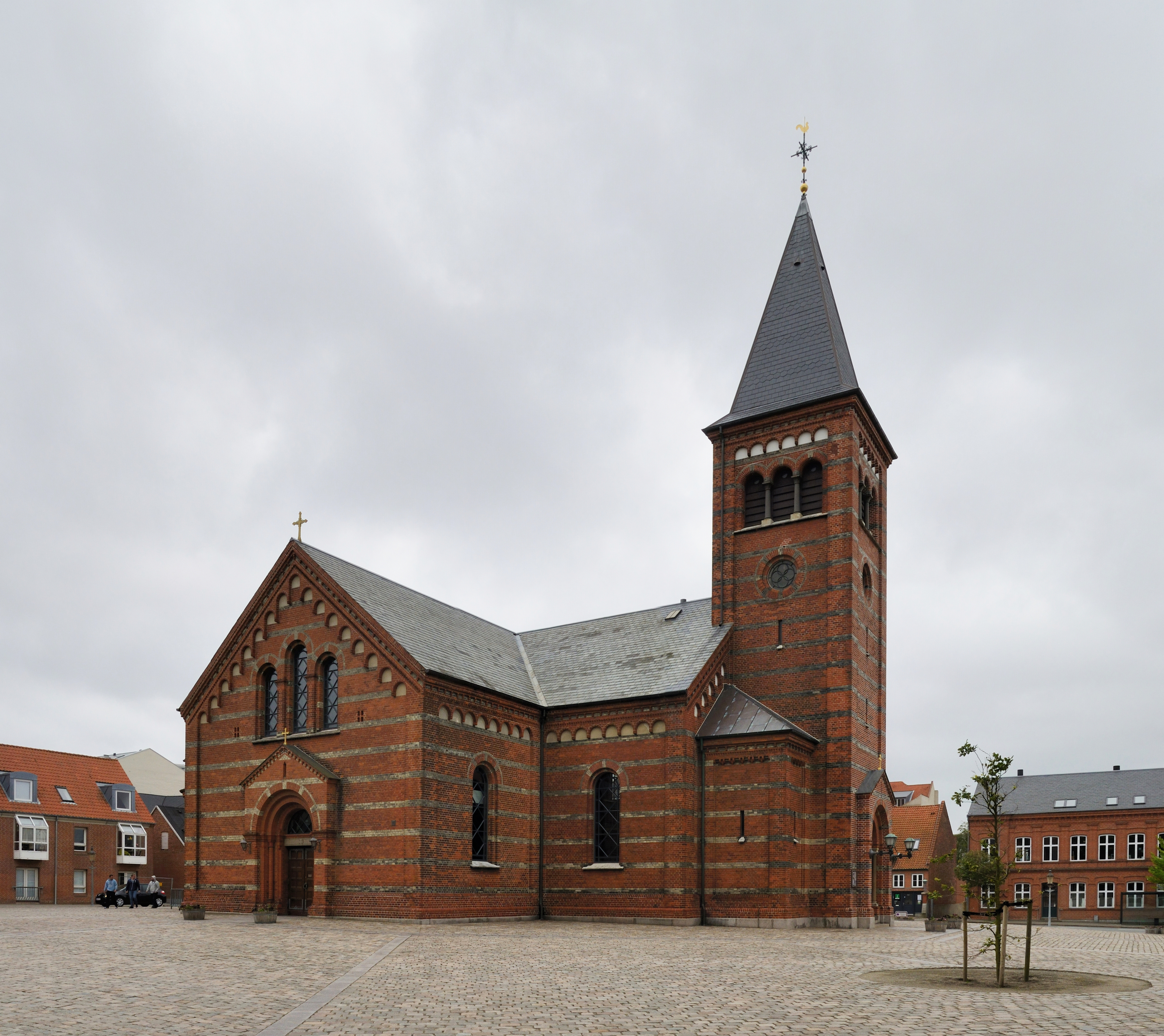
- Church of Our Saviour
- Location: Esbjerg
- Country: Denmark
- Denomination: Church of Denmark

History
- Founded: 1887

Administration
- Diocese: Diocese of Ribe
- Deanery: Skads Provsti
- Parish: Vor Frelsers Sogn

The Church of Our Saviour (Danish: Vor Frelsers Kirke) is a parish church in Esbjerg, Denmark. Completed in 1887 to a design by Axel Møller, it was the first church to be built in the rapidly growing new town.

== History ==
When Esbjerg was first developed in the late 1860s, the nearest church was in Jerne to the east. A committee set up in 1885 called for a new church to be built in the centre of Esbjerg as soon as possible. The government responded in 1886, granting half the necessary funding, the remainder being provided by Ribe Diocese. Construction began in May 1887 and the church was consecrated on 18 December the same year. In late 1990, the church became a parish in its own right. The first priest was installed in March 1891.

== Architecture ==
Located on the corner of Skolegade and Kirkegade, the church is a typical Neoromantic building in red brick with belts of grey stone on a granite socle. It originally consisted of a nave with a chancel and apse at the east end and an entrance through the tower to the west. Møller expanded the building in 1896 with transepts to the north and south fitted with galleries, doubling the seating capacity from 400 to 800. The outer walls are decorated with lesenes, round-arched friezes and a toothed cornice. The roof is slated, including the roof on the pyramid-shaped spire.

== Interior ==
In 1929, the church was decorated with frescos by Ole Søndergaard: the Paschal Lamb on the apse vault, Jesus blessing the children on the north wall, the Return of the Prodigal Son on the south wall and the Crucifixion on the chancel arch with groups of people on either side. The large Emmaus painting on the altarpiece is also the work of Søndergaard. The granite font is an old Romanesque piece which was found in the rectory garden in Jerne. The bowl is decorated with a relief with small triangular heads. There is a finely carved wooden pulpit with a canopy.

== I.C. Møller park ==
The church's former cemetery was converted into I.C. Møllerparken in 2013.

== Literature ==
- Bruhn, Verner; (Esbjerg)., Vor Frelsers Kirke (1987). Kirkeliv i Esbjerg: Vor Frelsers kirke i 100 år (in Danish). Menighedsrådet i Vor Frelsers sogn. ISBN 978-87-87490-31-3.
- Nationalmuseet (1985). Kirkerne i Varde og Esbjerg: Danmarks Kirker, Ribe Amt (in Danish). pp. 1003–1007.
