= Lejre Municipality (1970–2006) =

Former municipality in Denmark

Lejre Municipality (Lejre Kommune) was a municipality of Denmark.

The former Lejre Municipality covered an area of 88 km^{2} (34 sq mi), and had a total population of 8,724 (2005). Neighboring municipalities were Ramsø and Roskilde to the east, Bramsnæs Municipality to the north, Hvalsø Municipality to the west, and Hvalsø Municipality to the south. Most of the old municipality's northern border was defined by the waters of Roskilde Fjord. It belonged to Roskilde County.

As a result of Kommunalreformen ("The Municipal Reform" of 2007), the former Lejre Municipality merged with Bramsnæs Municipality and Hvalsø Municipality to form a new Lejre Municipality.
