= Carl Emil Moltke =

Danish diplomat

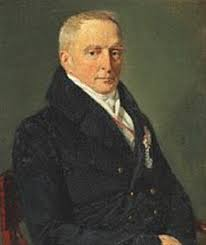
- Carl Emil Moltke painted by C. A. Jensen
- Born: 9 January 1773
- Died: 19 March 1858 (aged 85)
- Occupations: Diplomat and landowner

First Lieutenant Carl Emil Moltke (9 January 1773 – 19 March 1858) was a Danish naval officer, diplomat and politician. He owned Aagaard, Kalundborg Municipality from 1804 and Nørager from 1837.

== Early life and education ==
Moltke was born at Bregentved, the son of Adam Gottlob Moltke (1710–92) and Sophie Hedevig Raben (1733–1802). He was the brother of Otto Joachim Moltke and Gebhard Moltke-Hvitfeldt and the half-brother of Adam Gottlob Ferdinand Moltke, Caspar Moltke, Joachim Godske Moltke and Ludvig Moltke (1745–1824).

== Career as naval officer ==
He entered the Naval Cadet Academy in 1786 and was created second lieutenant in 1789. In 1791–92, he served under Captain Poul de Løvenørn on an expedition to Morocco. In 1793, he entered the Royal Navy as part of his training. In 1797, he was created first lieutenant. He was discharged from the Dano-Norwegian navy in 1803.

== Diplomatic career ==
Moltke began his diplomatic career in 1793 as secretary at the Danish legation in Lisbon. In 1801, he transferred to Madrid where he for a while served as chargé d'affaires. In 1804, he was appointed as Danish envoy in Stockholm but not accredited as such until three years later. He had to leave Stockholm the following year as a result of the war. In 1808 he was appointed as envoy in The Hague but did not fully assume the office until in 1815. In the intermediate years, he was used for various diplomatic missions, for instance in 1813 to the Russian headquarters in Silesia where he was to request Alexander I's mediation in the conflict with England. After five years in the Hague, Moltke was transferred to London. He discontinued his diplomatic career in 1822.

== Honours and public offices ==
Moltke was appointed as chamberlain in 1804 and as Gehejmekonferensråd in 1820. He was a member of Roskilde Provincial Assembly in 1835–46 and was in 1840 appointed as ordenssekretær.

== Personal life ==
Moltke married Asta Thusnelda Münster-Meinhövel (1788–1842), a daughter of Georg Werner August Dietrich Münster-Meinhövel (1751–1801) and Isabella Johanne Charlotte Ompteda (Amalie Münster) (1767–1814), on 5 July 1807 in the Farrison Church in Copenhagen. They had one son, Ernst Moltke ( 2 January 1822 – March 1896).

Moltke purchased Aagaard in 1804. He settled on the estate when he discontinued his diplomatic career in 1822. He purchased Nørager in 1837 and spent most of his last years on the estate. He died on 19 March 1858.
