= Ole Søndergaard =

Danish landscape painter (1876–1958)

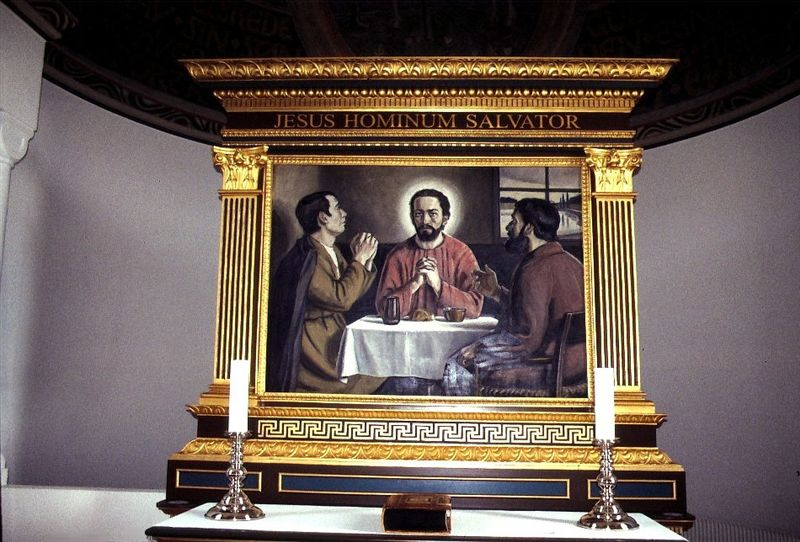
Ole Søndergaard's altarpiece in the Church of Our Saviour, Esbjerg

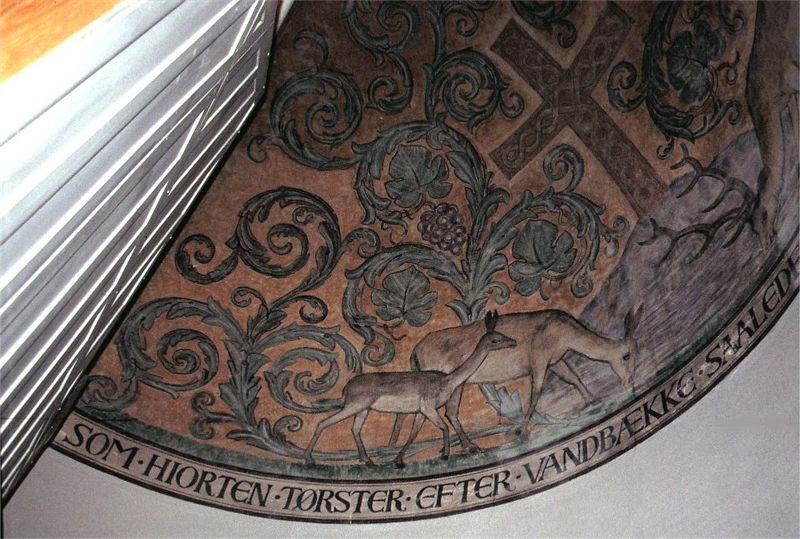
Ole Søndergaard's ceiling painting in the apse vault of Holbæk's Sankt Nikolai Church

Ole Laurits Olsen Søndergaard (24 May 1876 – 10 November 1958) was a Danish landscape painter. He also decorated a number of Danish churches with paintings and frescos.

== Biography ==
Born in Allerslev near Lejre in northwestern Zealand, Søndergaard studied painting at the Royal Danish Academy of Fine Arts from 1898 to 1900. He completed his education at Kunstnernes Frie Studieskoler under Kristian Zahrtmann in 1902.

Søndergaard was a versatile artist, remembered for his portraits and landscapes of the countryside around Roskilde. His paintings reveal his association with his friend L.A. Ring, especially his winter scenes with stooping figures shovelling snow. For his Roskilde Fjord ved Marbæk, he received the Eckersberg Medal in 1945. Other notable works are Kirken og smedjen i Jystrup and Snekasten, Jystrup, both painted in the early 1930s.

Another important aspect of Søndergaard's work was church decoration. On assignments for the National Museum of Denmark, he participated in the restoration of frescos in the churches of Lyngby, Ballerup, Måløv, Vallensved and Vallensbæk, as well as the cathedrals of Aarhus and Roskilde. He also decorated a number of Danish churches including the Church of Our Saviour, Esbjerg, (1929), St John's, Vejle, (1934), Jerslev Church (1944), and the apse vault of Sct Nikolai Church in Holbæk (1930).

== Awards ==
In 1945, Søndergaard was awarded the Eckersberg Medal and, in 1952, the Thorvaldsen Medal.
