= Øm (village) =

Village near Roskilde, Denmark

Coordinates: 55°36′N 12°01′E

Øm is a village with a population of 468 (1 January 2026) in Lejre Municipality, located six kilometers southwest of Roskilde on the island of Zealand in Denmark.

== Attractions ==
The Øm Jættestue, or passage grave, is situated between Lejre and Øm, around 10 km. southwest of Roskilde.
