= Tadre Watermill =

Watermill in Lejre, Denmark

- Tadre Mølle
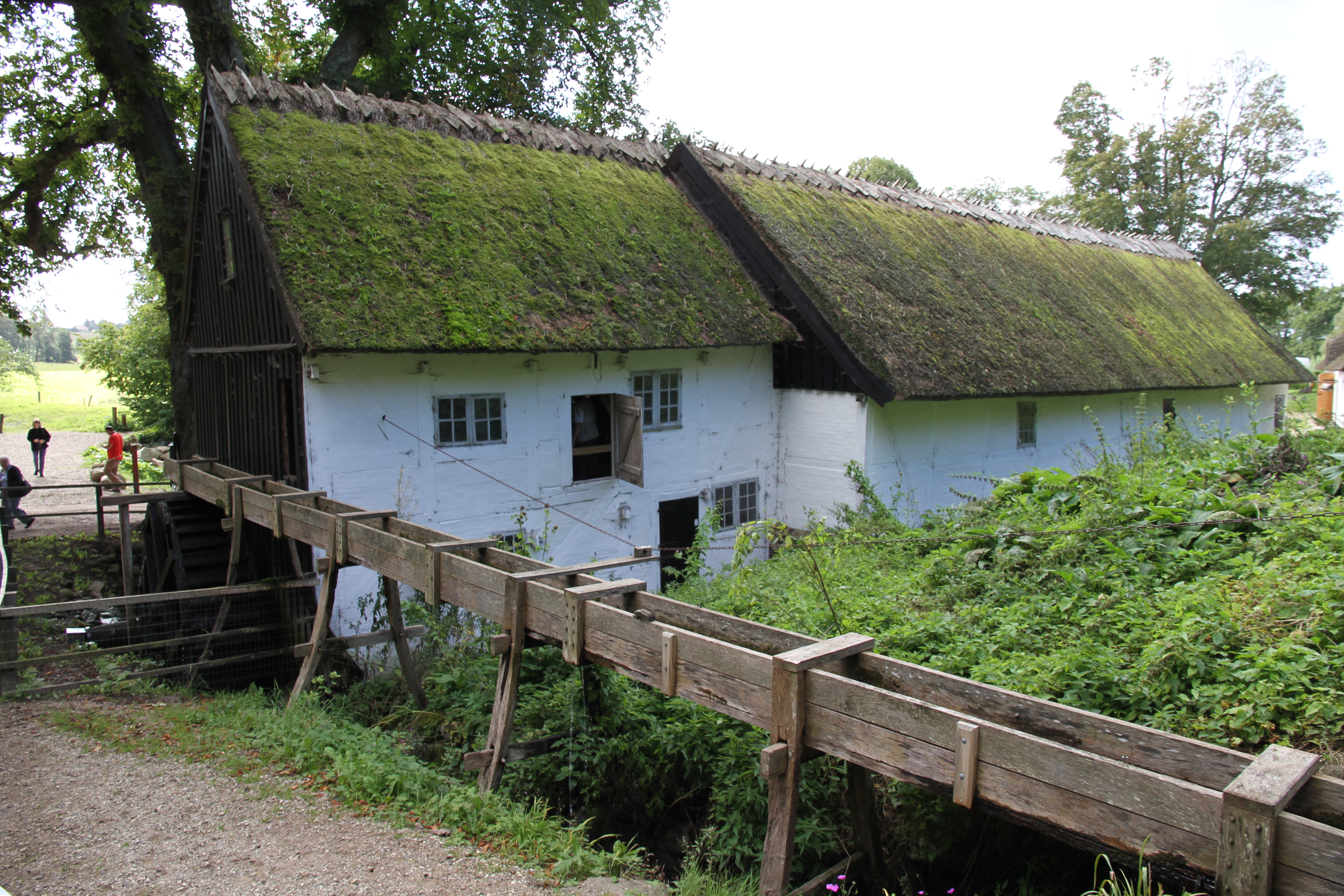
- Interactive map of the Tadre Watermill area

General information
- Location: Tadre Møllevej 23, 4330 Hvalsø, Denmark
- Coordinates: 55°36′53.41″N 11°48′47.57″E
- Completed: 1740
- Owner: Danish Nature Agency

Tadre Watermill (Danish; Tadre Mølle) is a watermill on Taderød Bæk, a tributary of Elverdams Å, in Lejre Municipality, between Roskilde and Tølløse, some 30 kilometres west of Copenhagen, Denmark. It is now operated as a museum and nature centre under Roskilde Museum. It used to belong to Aastrup Manor.

== History ==
A watermill has been located at the site since the 15th century. The millers on the property were copyholders under Åstrup Manor. The mill had lands attached making it possible to run a small farm along with the mill.

The current watermill was built as a grain mill in circa 1840. The site also included a stamp mill. The watermill was later converted into a saw mill.

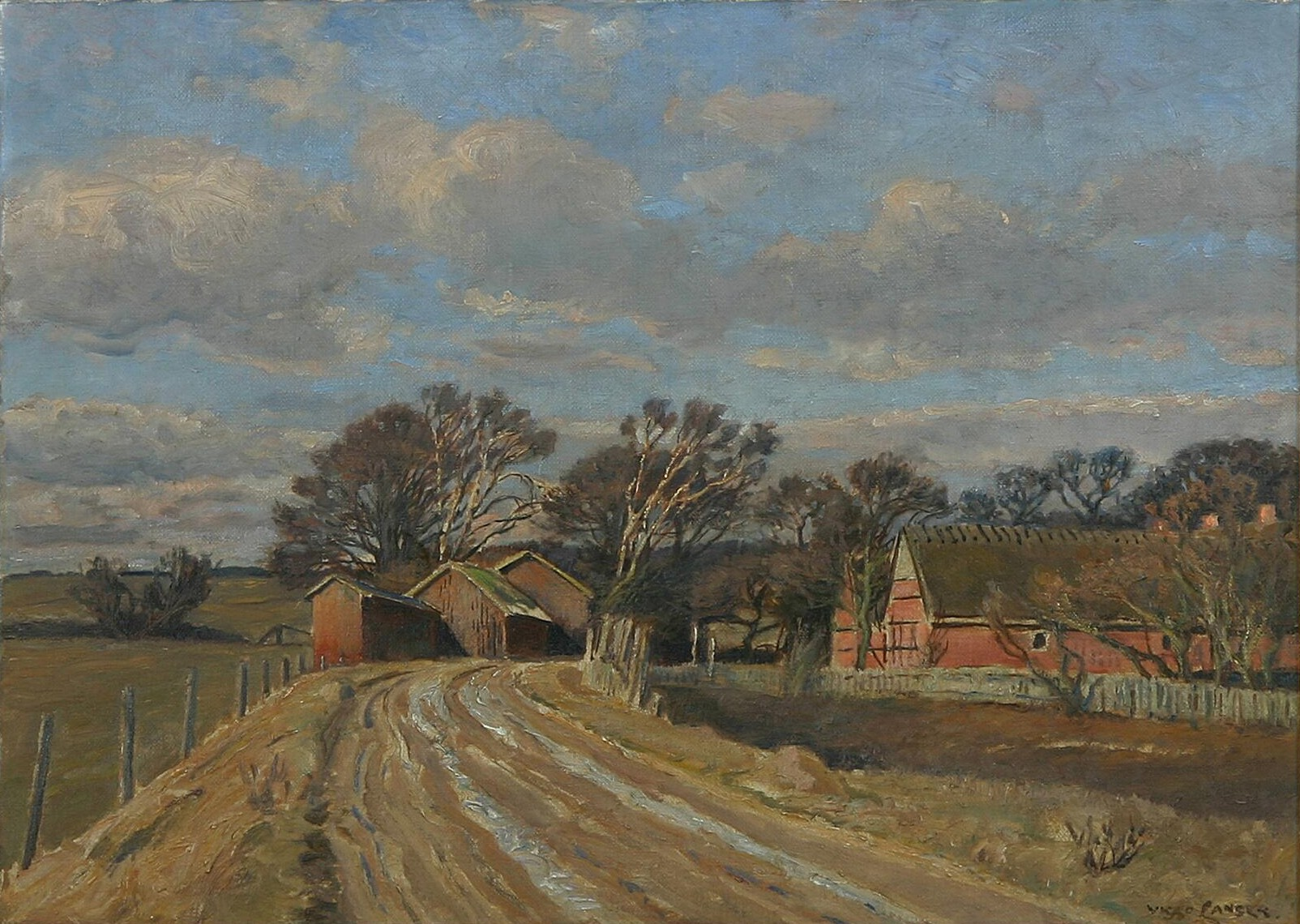
Tadre Watermill painted by Viggo Langer in 1938

Christian Henrik Hansen, a miller from Funen, leased the watermill in 1914. His 12-year-old daughter Marie assisted him in the work. She continued the operations after her father's death in 1845. She never married and operated the watermill alone while a farmhand was responsible for managing the associated farmland. Marie Hansen became a well-known figure among millers since it was highly unusual for a woman to handle the heavy mill work alone.

Marie Hansen purchased the watermill in 1952. It was listed on the Danish registry of protected buildings and places in 1959. In 1989 she chose to sell it to the state to ensure its preservation. She placed the money in a foundation that was to preserve it in return for a right to live in it for the rest of her life. She died at the age of 100 on 4 February 2003.

== Architecture ==
The mill is built on a base of boulders with half-timbered walls and board cladding on the gables. The roof is thatched with straw and the milling equipment is in almost original condition.

== Today ==
The watermill is owned by the Danish Nature Agency and operated by Roskilde Museum. The barn contains an exhibition about Elverdamsdalen and its watermills.

== Cultural references ==
Tadre Watermill has been used as a location in the films Det skete paa Møllegaarden (1960), Drømmen om det hvide slot (1962), Motorvej på sengekanten (1972) and Der var engang en dreng (2006). It has also been used as a location in the DR television series Livsens Ondskab and Mørklægning.

== See also ==
- List of watermills in Denmark
