= Kirke Hyllinge =

- Town
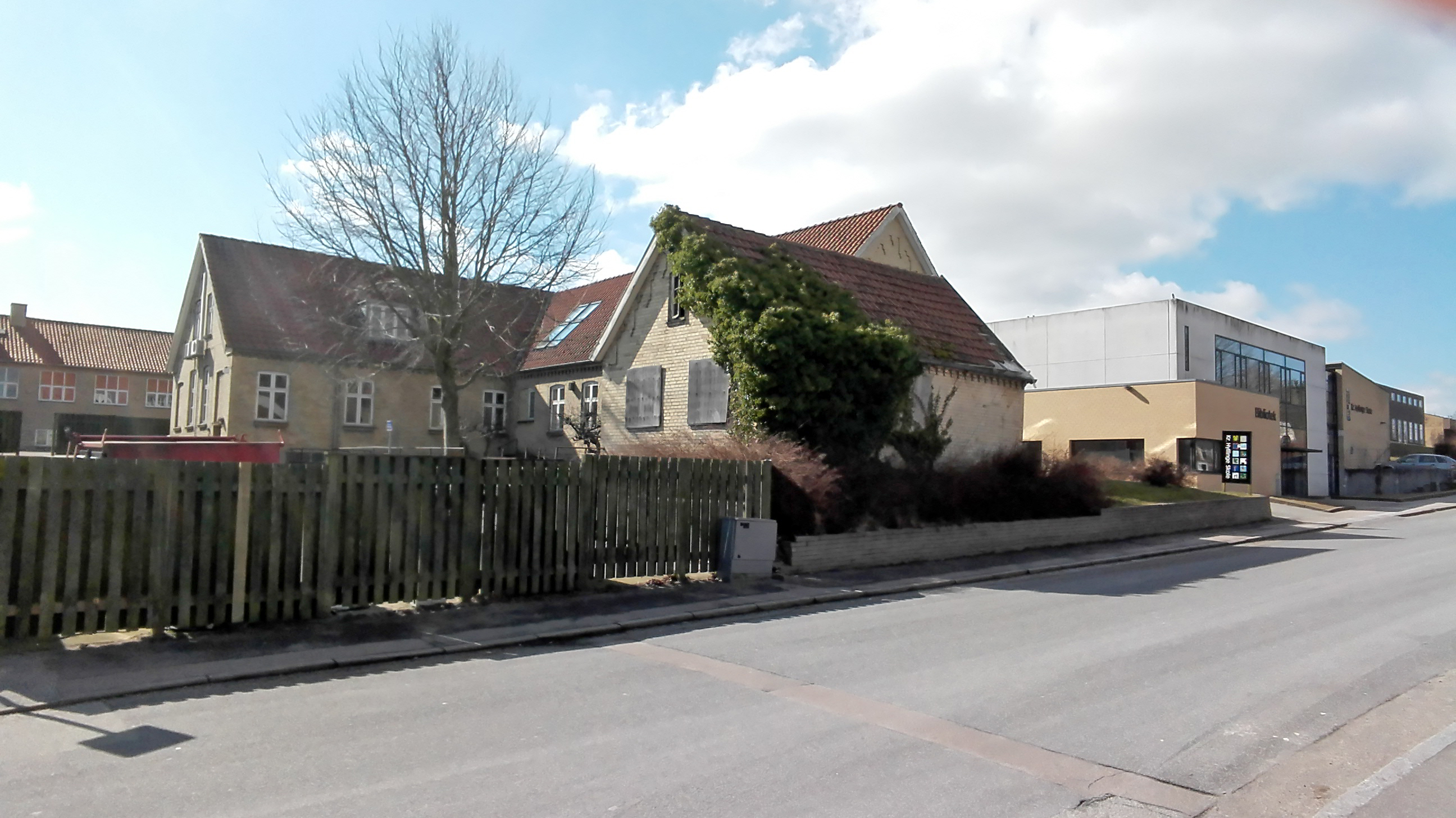
- Kirke Hyllinge School

- Location in Denmark Kirke Hyllinge (Denmark Region Zealand)
- Coordinates: 55°42′22″N 11°54′0″E
- Country: Denmark
- Region: Region Zealand
- Municipality: Lejre Municipality

Area
  - Urban: 1.4 km^{2} (0.54 sq mi)

Population (2026)
  - Urban: 2,354
  - Urban density: 1,700/km^{2} (4,400/sq mi)
- Time zone: UTC+1 (CET)
  - Summer (DST): UTC+2 (CEST)
- Postal code: DK-4070 Kirke Hyllinge

Kirke Hyllinge is a town, with a population of 2,354 (1 January 2026), situated on the Hornsherred peninsula in Lejre Municipality, Region Zealand in Denmark. It is located 21 km southwest of Frederikssund, 25 km northwest of Roskilde, 16 km east of Holbæk and 14 km north of the municipal seat Kirke Hvalsø.

Kirke Hyllinge was the municipal seat of the former Bramsnæs Municipality until 1 January 2007.

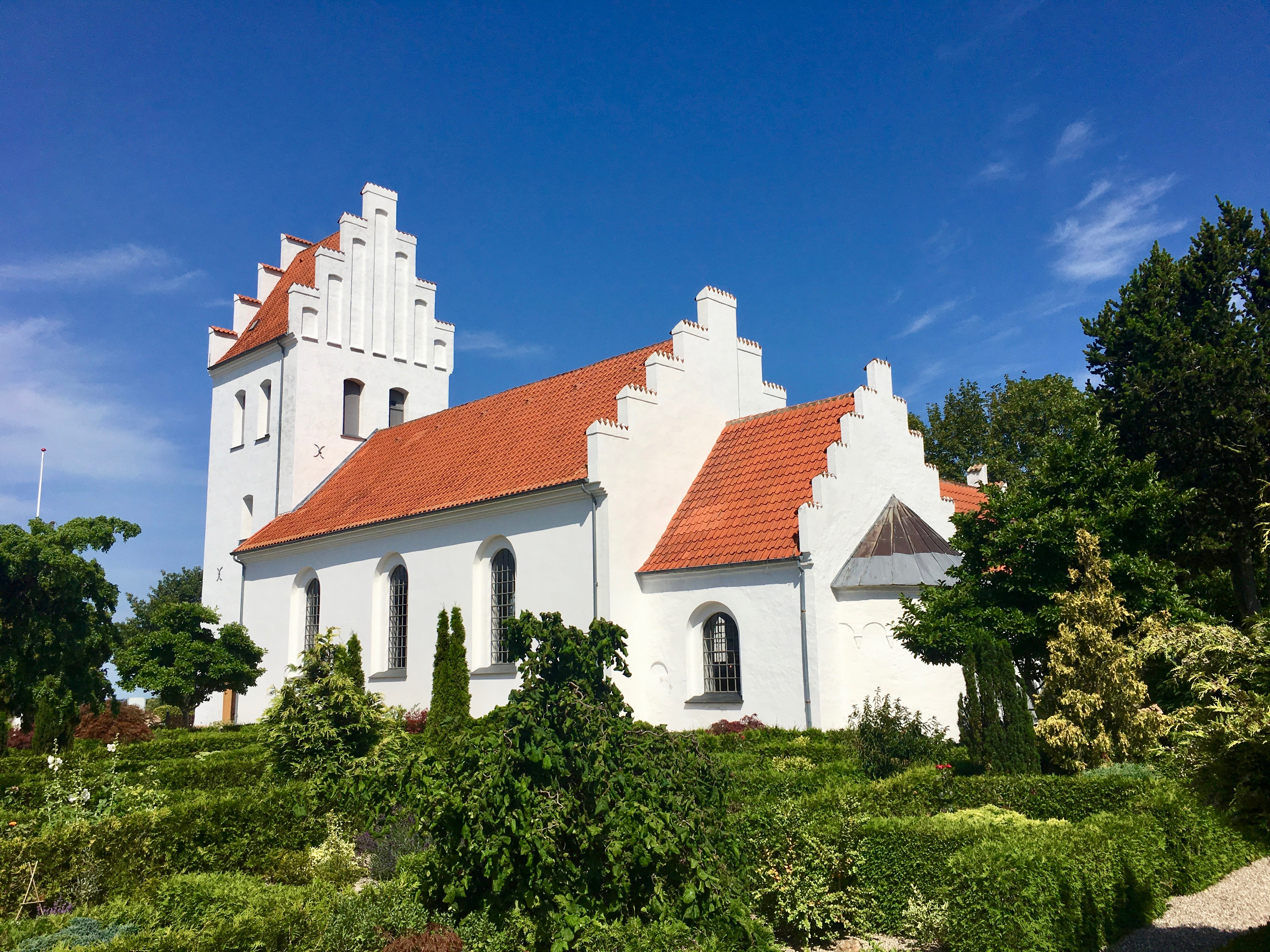
Kirke Hyllinge Church

Kirke Hyllinge Church is located on the western outskirts of the town. It is a Romanesque limestone church, one of the oldest churches on Zealand, from around 1100. It was built on the highest point in the area (43 metres above sea level) and stood high in spendid isolation until the mid-1960s.
