= Lejre Municipality =

Lejre Municipality Lejre Kommune (Danish)
- Municipality
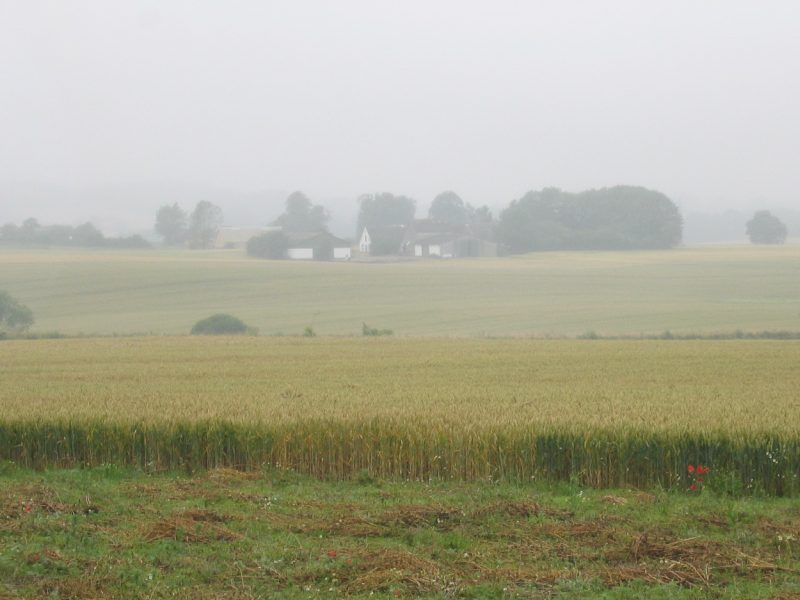
- Lejre municipality is primarily rural

- Coat of arms

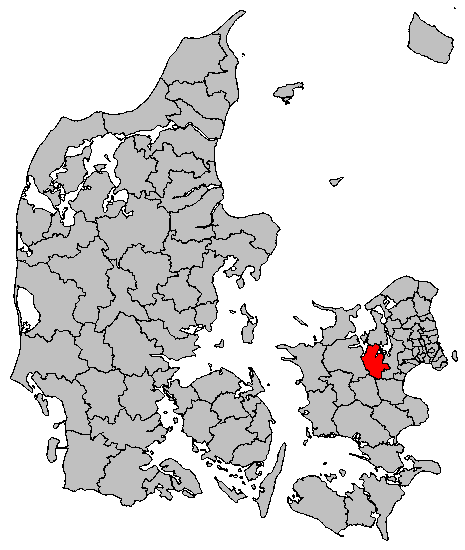
- Coordinates: 55°36′16″N 11°58′30″E
- Country: Denmark
- Region: Zealand
- Established: 1 January 2007
- Seat: Kirke Hvalsø

Government
  - Mayor: Tina Mandrup (V)

Area
  - Total: 240.07 km^{2} (92.69 sq mi)

Population (1. January 2026)
  - Total: 29,879
  - Density: 124.46/km^{2} (322.35/sq mi)
- Time zone: UTC+1 (CET)
  - Summer (DST): UTC+2 (CEST)
- Municipal code: 350
- Website: www.lejre.dk

Lejre Municipality (Danish: Lejre Kommune) is a kommune in the Region Zealand of Denmark.

The current municipality was established on 1 January 2007 as a result of Kommunalreformen ("The Municipal Reform" of 2007), merging the former Lejre Municipality with Bramsnæs Municipality and Hvalsø Municipality to form a new Lejre Municipality. On 28 September 2016 Carsten Rasmussen took over as mayor from Mette Touborg, who was leaving for a new job. She had been the mayor since 1 January 2010. She was the only one from the left wing Socialist People's Party to hold the highest political position in a municipality, whereas he is from the Social Democrats.

Local companies include the chocolate manufacturer Friis-Holm.

== Settlements ==
The municipality consists of the following settlements (populations as of 2011):

Kirke Hvalsø	3,941
Lejre	2,343
Osted	2,073
Kirke Hyllinge	1,984
Ejby	1,876

Gevninge	1,711
Kirke Såby	1,676
Kirke Sonnerup	965
Gershøj	688
Lyndby	561

and

- Kyndeløse Sydmark
- Øm (village)

== Politics ==
=== Municipal council ===
Lejre's municipal council consists of 25 members, elected every four years. Below are the municipal councils elected since the Municipal Reform of 2007.

Election	Party									Total seats	Turnout	Elected mayor
Election	A	B	C	F	I	L	O	V	Ø	Total seats	Turnout	Elected mayor
2005	7	1	1	1		2	1	12		25	77.1%	Flemming Jensen (V)
2009	6	1	2	6			1	9		25	72.2%	Mette Touborg (F)
2013	3		1	9	1		2	8	1	25	80.6%	Mette Touborg (F)
2017	6	1	2	5			2	8	1	25	78.3%	Carsten Rasmussen (A)
2021	6	1	4	4			1	8	1	25	74.13%	Tina Mandrup (V)
Data from Kmdvalg.dk 2005, 2009, 2013 and 2017

== Notable people ==
- Ole Søndergaard (1876 in Allerslev – 1958) a Danish landscape painter
- Jørgen Jørgensen (1888 in Kornerup – 1974) a Danish politician and party leader
- Karen Strand (1924 in Kirke Hyllinge – 2000) a Danish goldsmith and jewellery designer
- Patricia Crone (1945 in Kyndeløse – 2015) a Danish-American author, Orientalist and historian specializing in early Islamic history
