= Ledreborg =

Palatial mansion

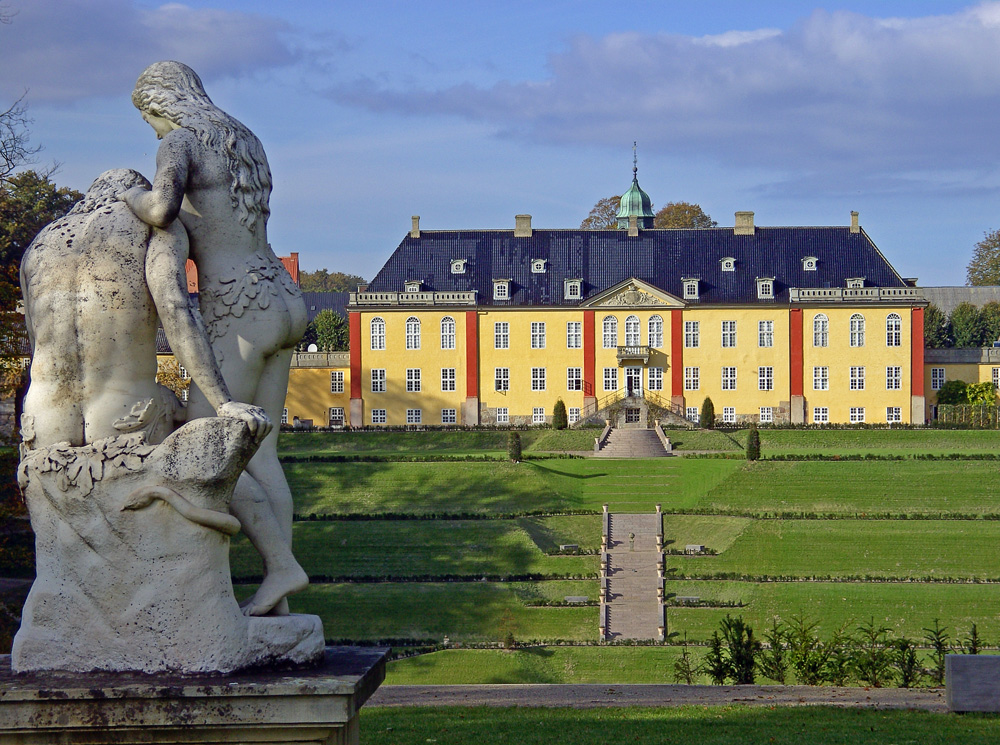
- Ledreborg in 2006
- Interactive map of the Ledreborg area

General information
- Architectural style: Baroque
- Location: Ledreborg Allé 2; 4320 Lejre, Denmark
- Coordinates: 55°36′20″N 11°57′1″E
- Completed: 1745

Design and construction
- Architect: Johan Cornelius Krieger

Ledreborg is a palatial mansion near Lejre, 12 km (7.5 mi) to the southwest of Roskilde on the Danish island of Zealand. Today's Baroque building was completed in 1746 by Minister of State Johan Ludvig Holstein (1694–1763) who commissioned J.C. Krieger to carry out the work.

== History and architecture ==
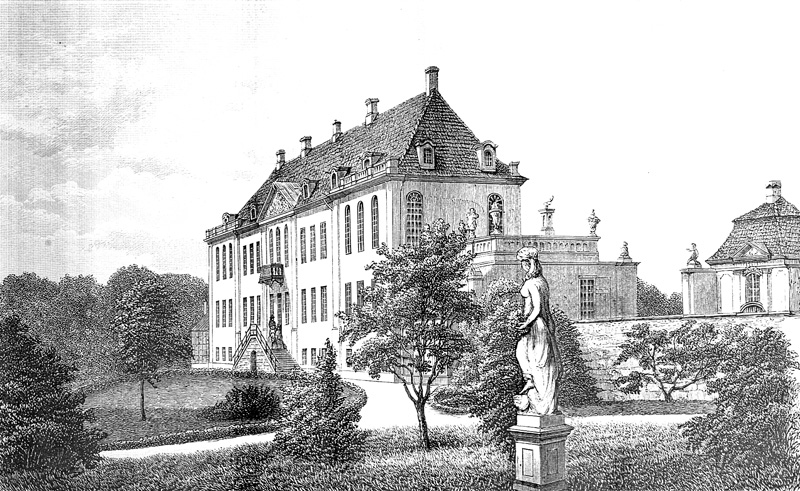
Ledreborg (1873)

The first reference to Lejreborg is fairly recent, dating to 1523 when Otto Tinhuus owned the property under the ancient Diocese of Roskilde. At the time, the estate was called Udlejre and consisted of four or five farms. After the Reformation, in 1545 Lejre became a fief in its own right under the jurisdiction of Copenhagen. In 1663, the statesman Henrik Müller purchased eight farms and five houses in Lejre including Udlejre. He presented the property to his daughter Drude and her husband, statesman Thomas Finke, who built a house called Lejregård. In 1661, Udlejregård was bought by the statesman Henrik Müller who built the first Lejregård manor house. in 1739, Johan Ludvig Holstein bought the property and developed the modest building into one of the country's finest mansions. He commissioned Johan Cornelius Krieger to extend the building to the east and west. Krieger also added a chapel and a monumental staircase designed by Jacob Fortling. In 1745, Niels Eigtved developed the interior, including the Rokoko banqueting hall, while Lauritz de Thurah decorated the inner courtyard with two pavilions and obelisk-shaped lampposts. A gatehouse was also added.

== Gardens ==
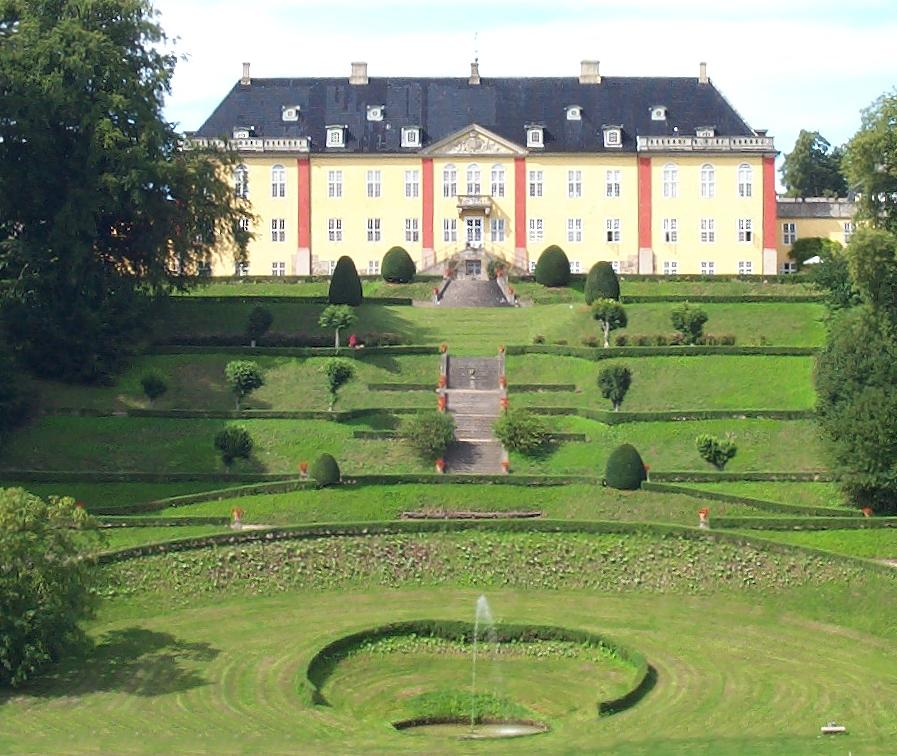
The terraced gardens of Ledreborg Palace

Also designed by Krieger from 1742 until the mid-1750s, the terraced Baroque park extends from the mansion down the steep slopes of the Kornerup Valley. In the wooded area to the east, the Dyrehaven was laid out in 1757–1762 with paths leading past sculptures and obelisks in line with the trends of the time. The terraced garden was completely renovated in 2004–2006 with a waterfall and fountain designed by Erik Heide who also included sculptures of Adam and Eve.

== Ledreborg today ==
The mansion can now be rented for meetings or conferences which can be accommodated in the banqueting hall or in the spacious reworked barn. Every August since 1994, the Danish National Chamber Orchestra has held popular concerts of film music and musicals in Ledreborg Park which enjoys exceptionally good acoustics.

== List of owners ==
- (1536-1559) Christian 3.
- (1559-1588) Frederick II
- (1588-1625) Christian IV
- (1625-1661) Lauritz Jensen
- (1661-1663) Henrik Müller
- (1663-1677) Thomas Fincke
- (1677-1704) Drude Henriksdatter Müller gift Fincke
- (1704-1705) Henrik Thomsen Fincke
- (1705-1711) Karen Gyldensparre gift Fincke
- (1711-1712) Fincke family
- (1712-1733) Mette Reedtz gift Lindenov
- (1733-1739) Hans Henrik Mandix
- (1739-1763) Johan Ludvig Holstein-Ledreborg
- (1763-1799) Christian Frederik Holstein
- (1799-1853) Christian Edzard Holstein-Ledreborg
- (1853-1895) Christian Edzard Moritz lensgreve Holstein-Ledreborg
- (1895-1912) Johan Ludvig Carl Christian Tido Holstein-Ledreborg
- (1912-1951) Josef Ignatius Maria lensgreve Holstein-Ledreborg
- (1951-1990) Knud Johan Ludvig lensgreve Holstein-Ledreborg
- (1990-) Silvia Knudsdatter komtesse Holstein-Ledreborg gift Munro / John Munro

== See also ==
- List of Baroque residences

== Literature ==
- Scavenius, Bente (2008). Danmarks dejligste haver: en kystvandring. Gyldendal A/S. pp. 131–. ISBN 978-87-02-06210-6.
- Sommer, Anne-Louise (2009). Den danske arkitektur. Gyldendal A/S. pp. 172–. ISBN 978-87-02-05401-9.
