= Lejre railway station =

Railway station in Zealand, Denmark

Lejre
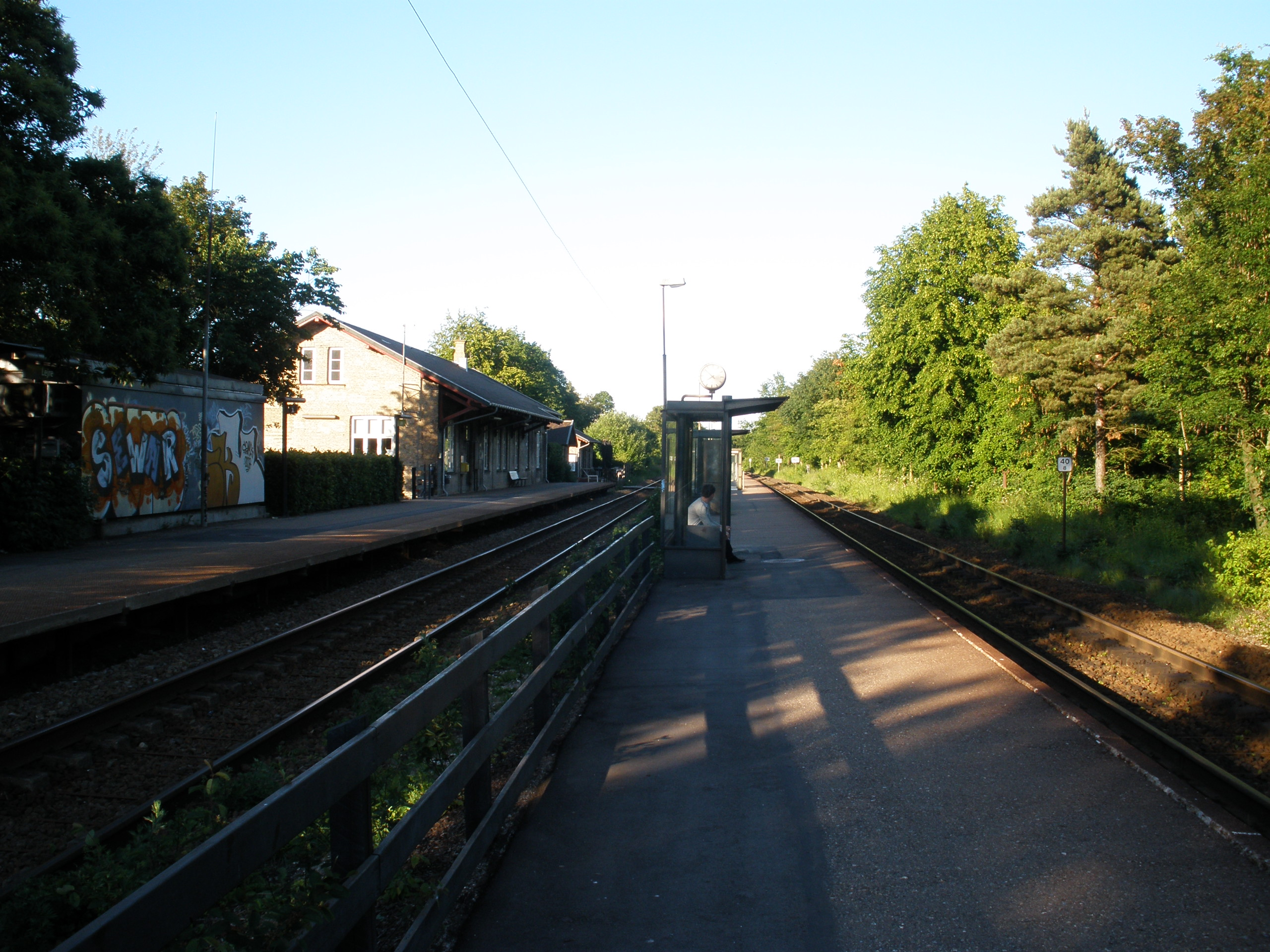
- Lejre station in 2010

General information
- Location: Stationsvej 2; 4320 Lejre; Lejre Municipality; Denmark
- Coordinates: 55°36′16.74″N 11°58′17.04″E
- Elevation: 22.4 metres (73 ft)
- Owner: DSB (station infrastructure); Banedanmark (rail infrastructure)
- Line: Northwest Line
- Platforms: 2
- Tracks: 2
- Train operators: DSB

Construction
- Architect: Niels Peder Christian Holsøe

Other information
- Station code: Lj
- Website: Official website

History
- Opened: December 30, 1874; 151 years ago
- Former names: Leire (until 1888)

Services
Preceding station	DSB	Following station
Roskilde towards Helsingør	Elsinore–Copenhagen– Roskilde–Holbæk Regional train	Hvalsø towards Holbæk
Location

Lejre railway station is a railway station serving the railway town of Lejre west of the city of Roskilde on the island of Zealand, Denmark. The station is located in the central part of the town and also serves the nearby village of Gammel Lejre, the Ledreborg manor house and the archaeological open-air museum Land of Legends (Sagnlandet Lejre).

Lejre railway station is situated on the Northwest Line from Roskilde to Kalundborg. The station opened in 1874. It offers regional rail services to Holbæk, Roskilde and Copenhagen operated by the national railway company DSB.

== History ==
Lejre railway station opened on 30 December 1874 as one of the original intermediate stations on the Northwest Line. The station opened approximately 1.5 km south of the old village of Lejre. After the opening of the railway line, a railway town developed around the station. The railway town is today known as Lejre, whereas the old village is known as Gammel Lejre (English: Old Lejre)

== Architecture ==
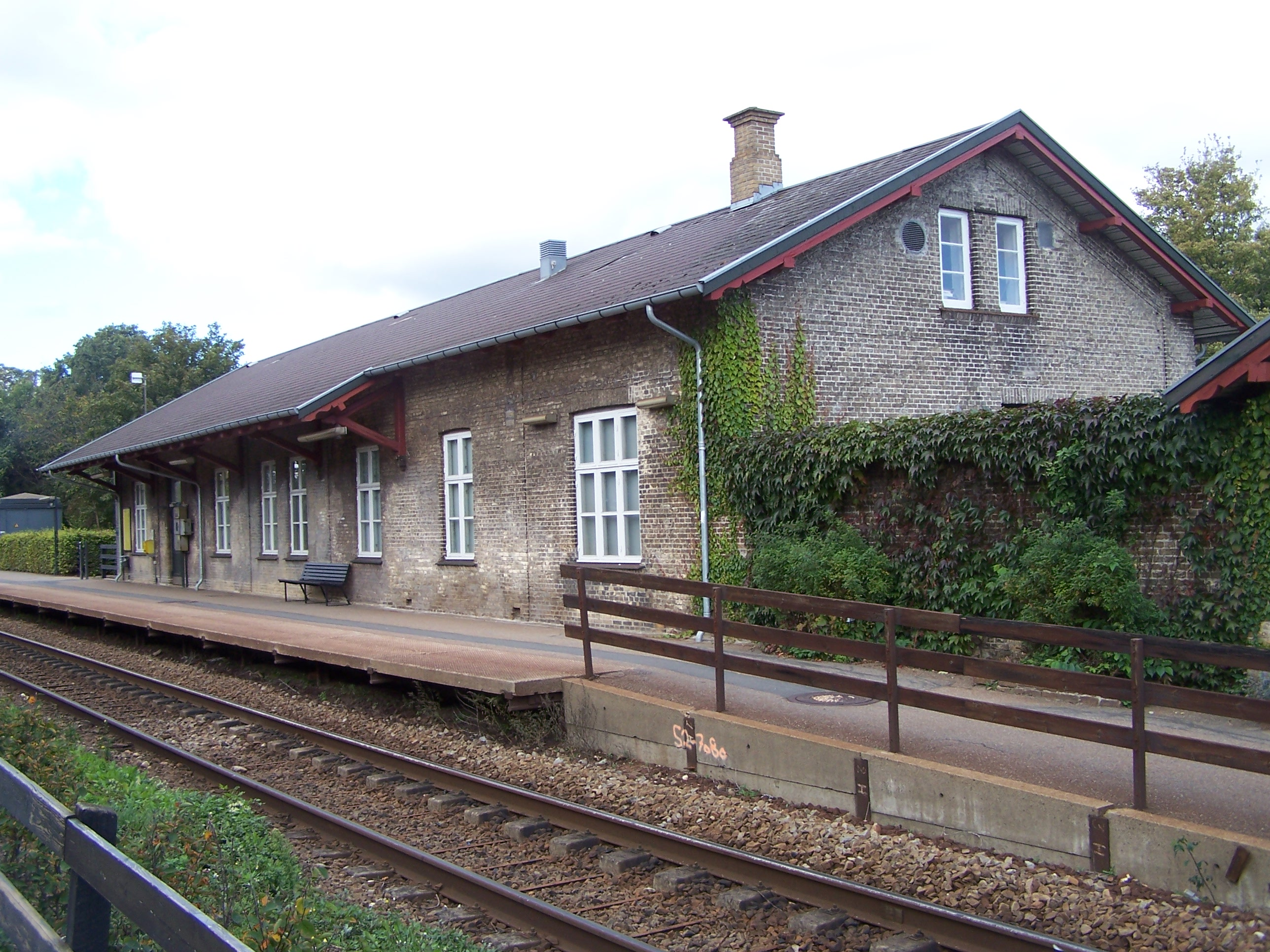
Platform facade of the station building in 2010.

The original and still existing station building from 1874 was designed by the Danish architect Niels Peder Christian Holsøe (1826–1895), known for the numerous railway stations he designed across Denmark in his capacity of head architect of the Danish State Railways.

== Services ==
The station offers frequent regional rail services to Holbæk, Roskilde and Copenhagen operated by the national railway company DSB.

== Gallery ==
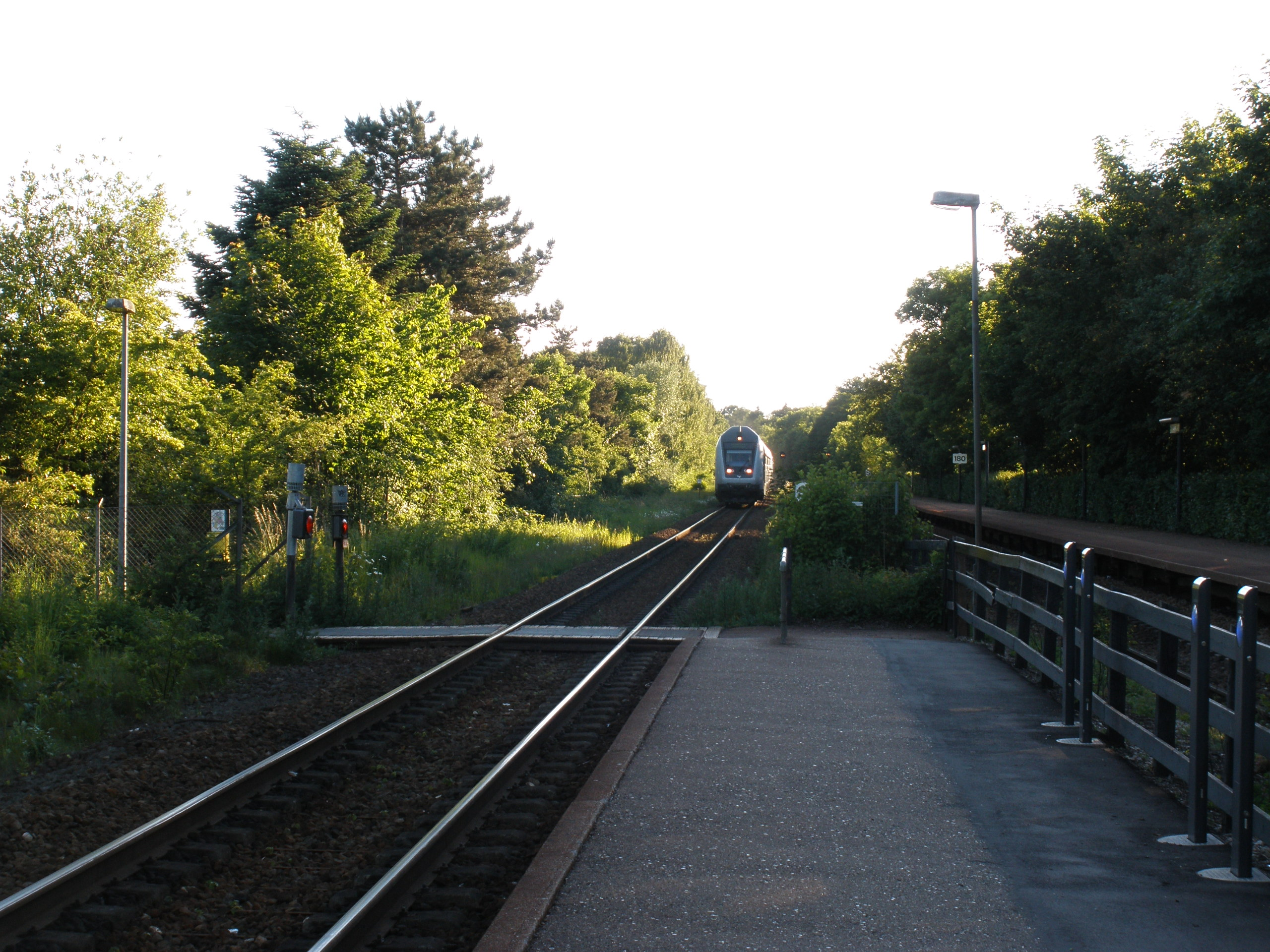
Entrance for track 2 (direction Roskilde) from a pathway along the station

== See also ==
- List of railway stations in Denmark
- Rail transport in Denmark
- History of rail transport in Denmark
