= Odin from Lejre =

10th-century Norse silver miniature

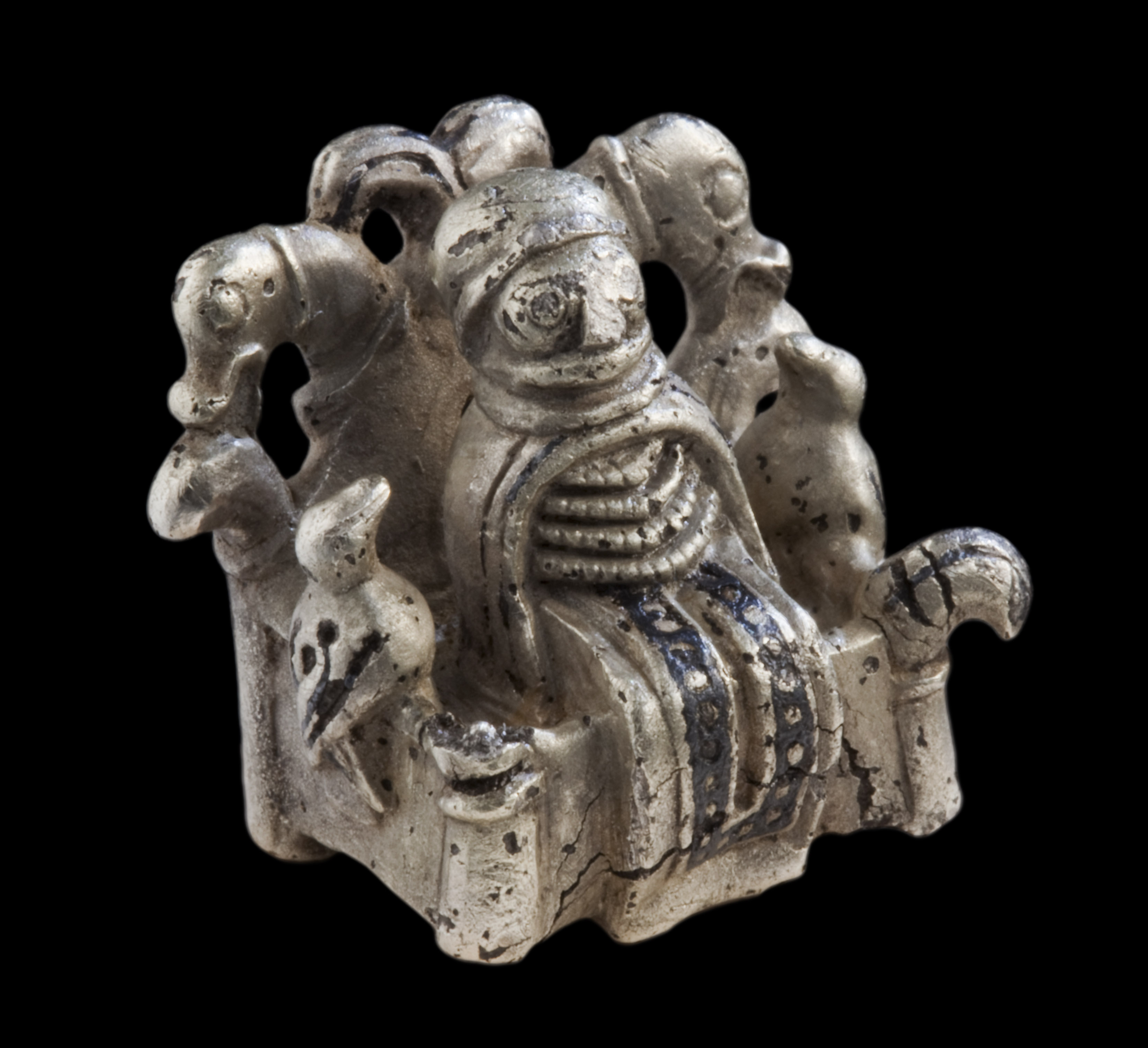
Odin from Lejre (approx 900 AD) - Lejre excavations, September 2009. Photo by Mogens Engelund.

Odin from Lejre is a small cast silver figurine from approximately 900 C.E., depicting an individual on a throne flanked by two birds and two animal heads.

== Discovery ==
The figurine was found by local amateur archaeologist Tommy Olesen on 2 September 2009, during the Roskilde Museum excavations of a small village at Gammel Lejre ("Old Lejre") near the modern town of Lejre, Denmark. The figurine was unveiled at the Roskilde Museum on 13 November 2009, and is now part of the permanent exhibition.

== Description ==
The cast silver figurine is from approximately 900 C.E. It measures 18 mm in height and weighs 9 grams. It depicts an individual on a throne, wearing a floor-length dress, an apron, four bead necklaces, a neck ring, a cloak and a rim-less hat. Two birds are seated on the armrests and the back of the throne features the heads of two animals. The figurine has inlay of black niello (black coloured alloy) and some gilding.

== Identity ==
The identity of the figure depicted has been the subject of some dispute. The excavator interpreted it as the god Odin sitting on his throne Hliðskjálf, from which he sees into all the worlds. The birds would be the ravens Huginn and Muninn, who gathered information for Odin. The beast-heads might symbolise Odin's two wolves, Geri and Freki. However, some scholars specialising in Viking Age dress and gender representation have pointed out that the person is dressed entirely in female attire, resulting in theories that the figure may in fact represent either the goddesses Frigg (the wife of Odin) or Freyja. Parallels have been pointed to between "Odin from Lejre" and a silver figure often identified as Freyja found in Aska, Sweden. An in-depth 2018 study concluded that the person on the throne is definitely not dressed in the era's typical male attire, but that it might equally well be high-status female dress or that of a male Christian bishop. Neither would point towards Odin.

== See also ==
- Eyrarland Statue
- Rällinge statuette
