= Errett =

Errett is a given name. Notable people with the name include:

- Errett Bishop (1928–1983), American mathematician known for his work on analysis
- Errett Callahan (1937–2019), American archaeologist, flintknapper, and pioneer in experimental archaeology and lithic replication studies
- Errett Lobban Cord (1894–1974), leader in United States transport during the early and middle 20th century
- Errett P. Scrivner (1898–1978), U.S. Representative from Kansas

== See also ==
- Russell Errett (1817–1891), Republican member of the U.S. House of Representatives from Pennsylvania
