= Rällinge statuette =

Viking era ithyphallic figure

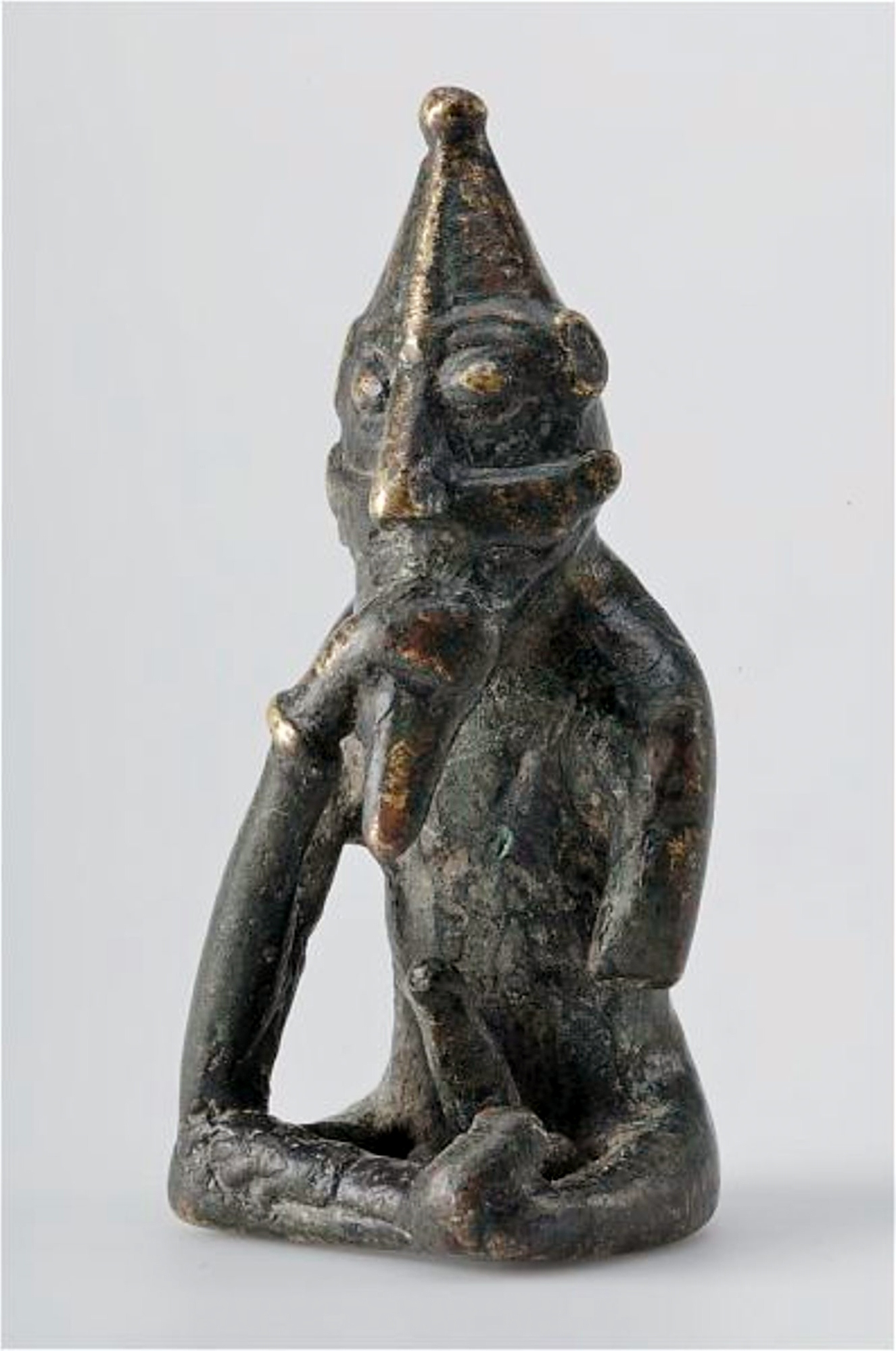
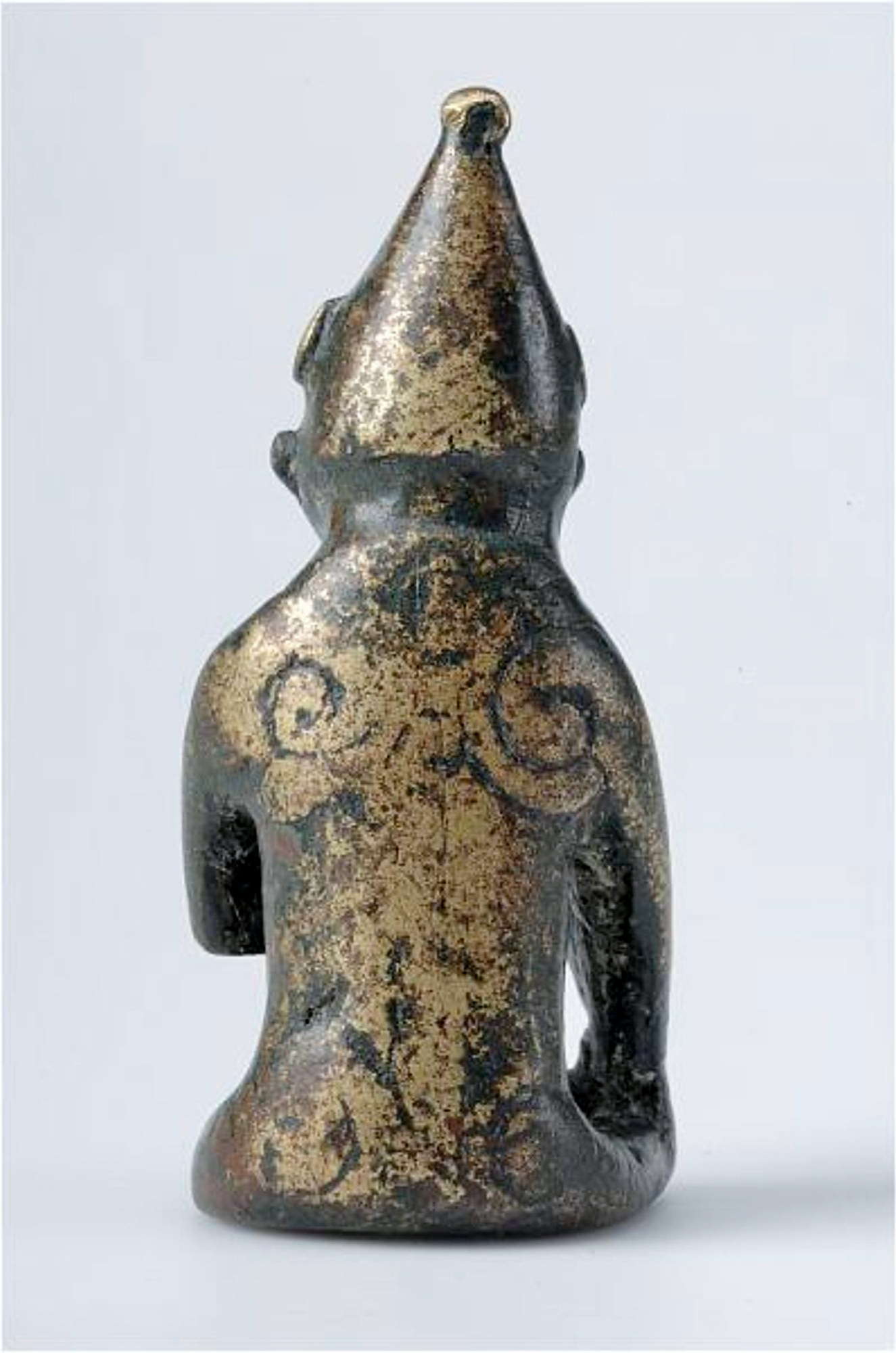
The statuette from the front and the back

The Rällinge statuette is a seated figure in bronze, discovered in Södermanland, Sweden in 1904 and dated to the Viking Age. The seven-centimetre-high figure, who wears a conical headdress, clasps his pointed beard and has an erect penis, has often been assumed to be the god Freyr. This is due to an 11th-century description of a phallic Freyr statue in the Temple at Uppsala, but the identification is uncertain.

It has also been suggested that the figure is a gaming piece, a flute player, and the god Thor blowing his beard to create wind. If it is the image of a god, it could be a small, devotional statuette of a type mentioned in Old Norse sagas. The object is in the collection of the Swedish History Museum.

== Discovery and description ==
The object was discovered in the spring of 1904 at the farm Rällinge in Lunda parish, Södermanland, Sweden. According to the original report, it was found by Edvard Holmgren in the farm's garden under "a vast morass of stones, earth and several large trees and bushes". In 1990, the archivist Thomas Skalm presented documents which instead say that it had been found by the 12-year-old boy Gustav Karlsson in the farm's potato field; Karlsson had sold it to Holmgren for 25 öre, and Holmgren had gone to the Swedish History Museum in Stockholm where he received 20 kronor for it. The museum still has it in its possession.

The statuette is made of bronze and has been dated to the late Viking Age, around the year 1000. It is 6.9 centimetres (2.7 in) high and weighs 141.3 grams (4.98 oz). Based on the design, and how it differs from contemporary artworks from continental Europe, it is assumed to have been made by a Scandinavian sculptor. The figure sits cross-legged and clasps his beard with his right hand while his left hand rests on his knee, with a part of the left arm missing. He wears a bracelet on each wrist and a conical helmet or pointed cap on his head. The beard is pointed and long and is accompanied by a large, upturned moustache. The figure is ithyphallic, which means he is depicted with an erect penis. The back of his shoulders and his buttocks are decorated with spiral patterns.

== Identity ==
=== Freyr ===
Tertius est Fricco, pacem voluptatemque largiens mortalibus'. Cuius etiam simulacrum fingunt cum ingenti priapo. [The third is Frikko, who bestows peace and pleasure on mortals. His likeness, too, they fashion with an immense phallus.]

— Adam of Bremen, Gesta Hammaburgensis (Book 4, XXVI)

The earliest suggestion for the figure's identity was that it is the god Freyr. This position was taken by the archaeologist Bernhard Salin in the earliest scholarly article about the object, published in 1913. The identification with Freyr remains the most accepted and is repeated in many works about Old Norse religion and the Viking Age. It is, however, uncertain; the claim is supported only by the phallus, which is associated with Freyr through the 11th-century chronicler Adam of Bremen; Adam of Bremen made a single, possibly unreliable, (Note: Adam of Bremen's terms idolum [idol] and simulacrum [image, idol] may have been part of an anti-pagan polemic rather than an accurate account of the Uppsala cult.) mention of a phallic statue of Freyr supposed to have stood in the Temple at Uppsala. The Rällinge figure does not display any of the known attributes of Freyr from his myths, such as his sword, ship or boar. (Note: Freyr's attributes are most prominently attested in the texts Gylfaginning, Skáldskaparmál, Völuspá, Grímnismál and Skírnismál, and a euhemerised version of him appears in the Ynglinga saga.)

According to the historian of religions Olof Sundqvist, the statuette could be connected to Freyr's association with royalty and his function as a model for kings. Freyr was associated with battle and fertility, and Sundqvist writes that the statuette's helmet could represent the god's warrior aspect and the phallus his fertility aspect. This would correspond to a human king's responsibility to provide the military protection needed to keep the land of a kingdom fertile.

=== Other theories ===
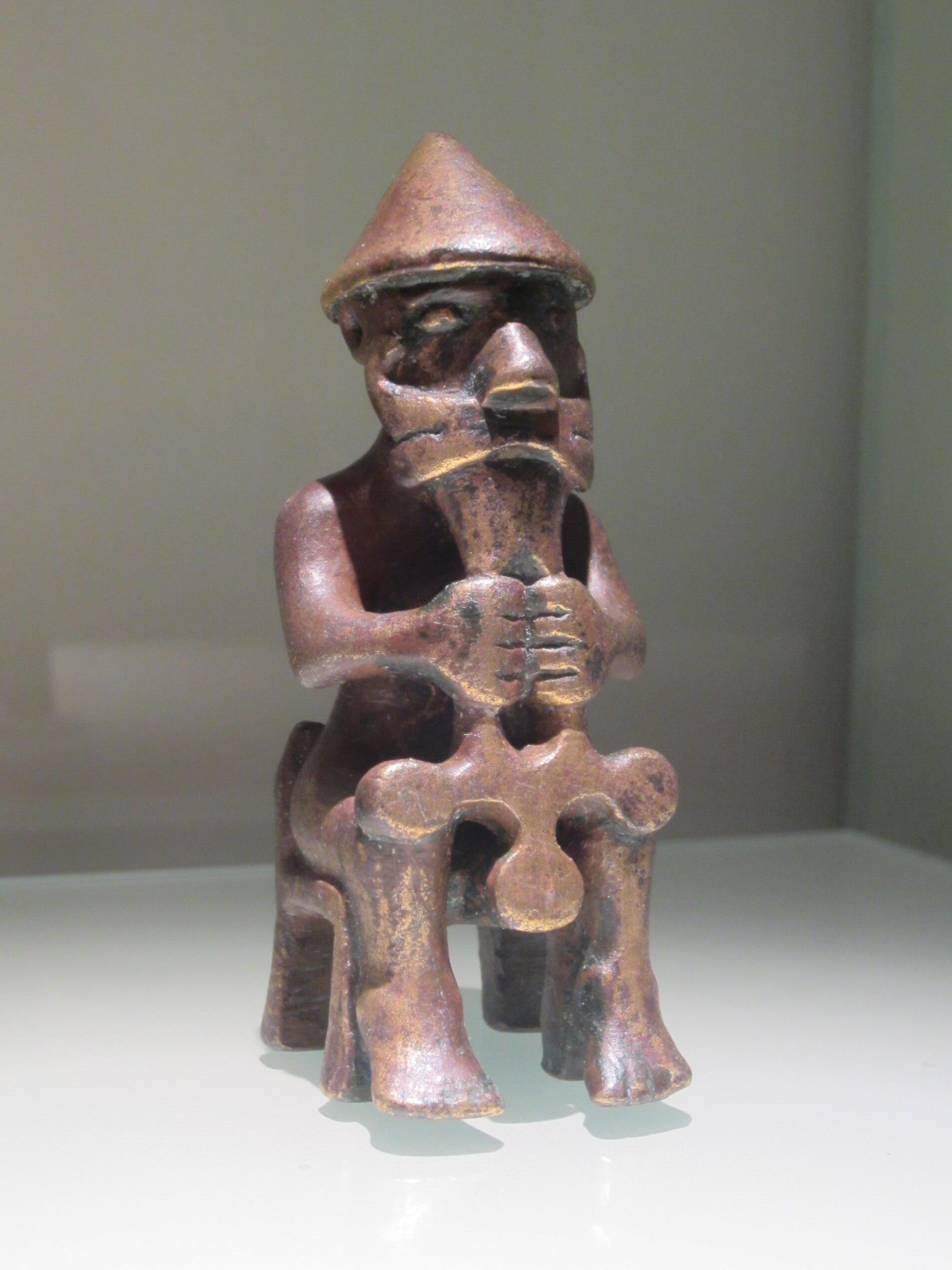
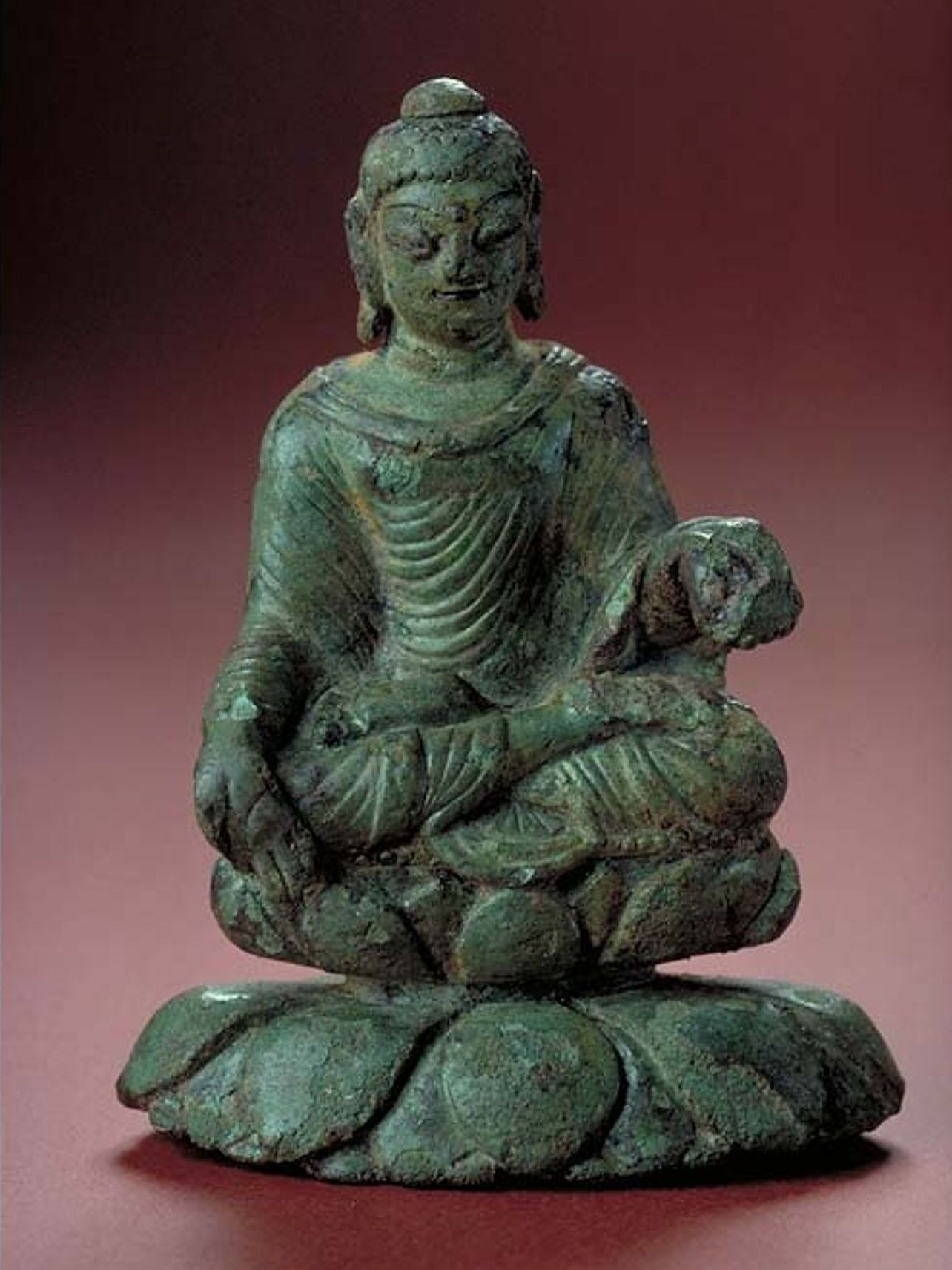
The Eyrarland statue and the Helgö Buddha have been compared to the Rällinge statuette.

The archaeologist Kristján Eldjárn wrote that the Rällinge statuette might not be an image of a mythological figure but a gaming piece. Because of similarities in age and design, Eldjárn wrote that it "seems doubtless" that it belongs to the same artistic tradition as the Eyrarland statue from Iceland. The latter is often assumed to be a representation of the god Thor, but also resembles a smaller Icelandic whalebone figure, found in a grave in Baldursheimur together with black and white gaming pieces and a die. Eldjárn suggested that the statuettes are king pieces from hnefatafl game sets. Another suggestion came from the philologist Lotte Motz, who wrote that the statuettes from Eyrarland, Baldursheimur and Rällinge could represent musicians. She wrote that the Rällinge statuette probably depicts a flute player, and compared it to images of "phallic flutists" from other regions.

The Norse studies scholar Richard Perkins writes that the statuette could be a depiction of Thor who blows in his beard to create wind. Even if the figure is Freyr, which Perkins does regard as the most likely identity, some tradition could have attributed Freyr rather than Thor with the ability to control the wind with his beard.

Perkins further suggests that the figure has adopted features from the Buddha, inspired by depictions such as the 6th-century Buddha statuette found on the island of Helgö, not far from Rällinge. Not only could the position of the legs be inspired by the Buddha, writes Perkins, but the conical headdress could be a stylised version of the ushnisha. The archaeologist Neil Price writes that if the identification is based solely on the phallus, a symbol for a sexually active man, there is no lack of candidates from Norse myth, legend and history: in addition to Freyr, it is not possible to rule out other gods such as Odin, other beings like dwarfs, jötunns and elves, and human kings and earls such as Hakon Jarl.

== Parallels in sagas and archaeology ==
Although nothing is known for certain about the Rällinge statuette's original purpose, there are attestations of small devotional statuettes in the Old Norse saga literature. The Hallfreðar saga tells how Hallfreðr, the favourite poet of the Christian king Olaf Tryggvason, secretly carried a small ivory statuette of Thor which he worshipped, and Ingimundur Þorsteinsson is said in the Vatnsdæla saga to have kept an item ("hlutr") with a silver engraving of Freyr. The philologist E. O. G. Turville-Petre wrote that the Rällinge and Eyrarland statuettes, like the statuettes in the sagas, may have been for personal devotional purposes.

In 2002, three small phallic figurines from the Iron Age were uncovered at the farm Lunda in Strängnäs parish, also in Södermanland. Although they differ in design from the Rällinge statuette—two of them instead show similarities to the Kymbo figurine found in Västergötland—that makes for a total of four phallic statuettes found in Södermanland. According to an article in Fornvännen, it might be of significance that all four were found in the vicinity of places named Lunda ("the grove" in Swedish).

== See also ==
- Odin from Lejre
- Priapus
- Satyr
- Viking art
