= Hvalsø railway station =

Railway station in Zealand, Denmark

Hvalsø
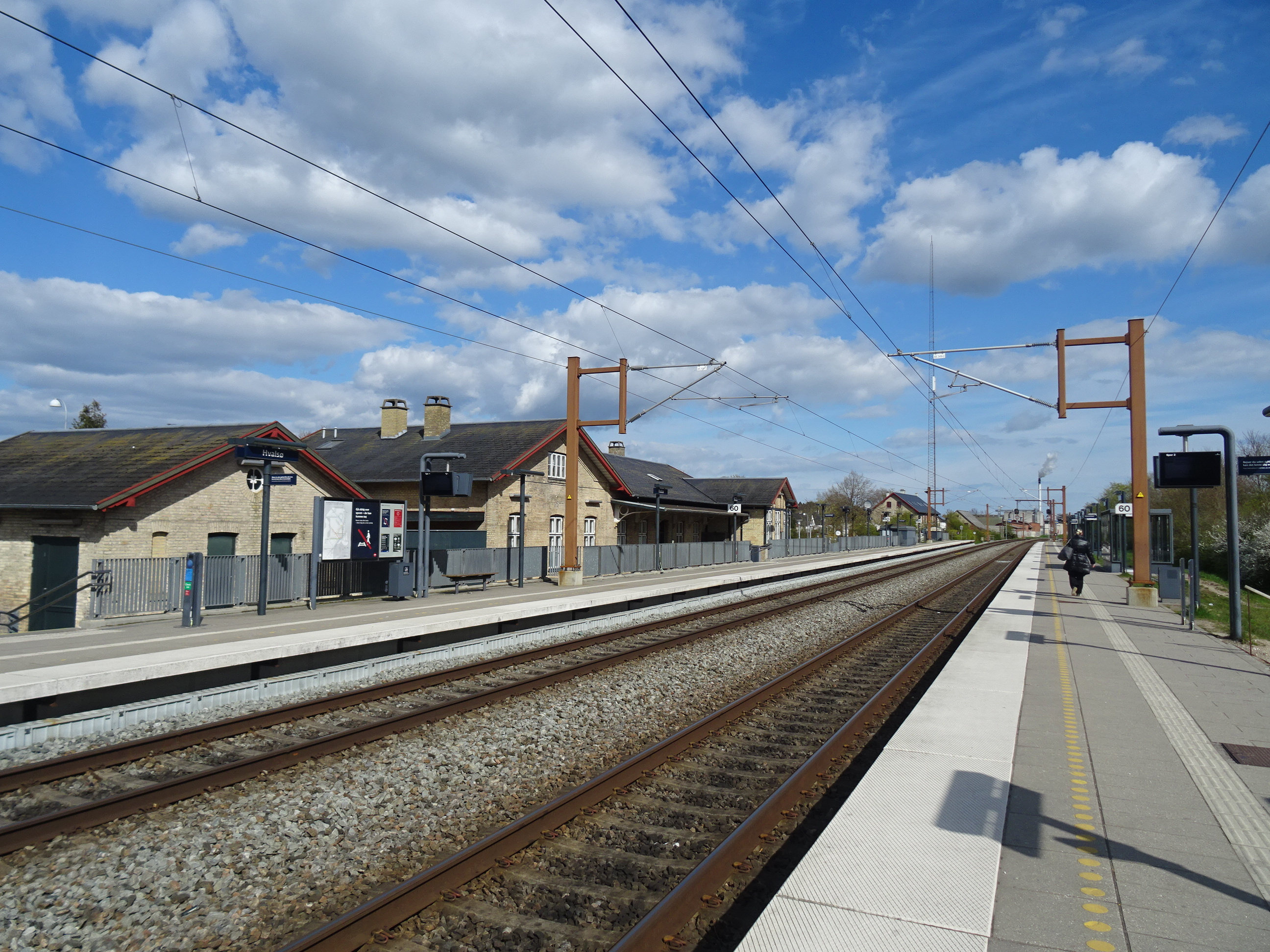
- Hvalsø station in 2024

General information
- Location: Tølløsevej 1A; 4330 Hvalsø; Lejre Municipality; Denmark
- Coordinates: 55°35′43.9″N 11°51′36.03″E
- Elevation: 57.3 metres (188 ft)
- Owner: DSB (station infrastructure); Banedanmark (rail infrastructure)
- Line: Northwest Line
- Platforms: 2
- Tracks: 2
- Train operators: DSB

Construction
- Architect: Niels Peder Christian Holsøe

Other information
- Station code: Hv
- Website: Official website

History
- Opened: December 30, 1874; 151 years ago

Services
| Preceding station | DSB | Following station |
|---|---|---|
| Lejre towards Helsingør | Elsinore–Copenhagen– Roskilde–Holbæk Regional train | Tølløse towards Holbæk |
Location

Hvalsø railway station is a railway station serving the railway town of Kirke Hvalsø between the cities of Roskilde, Holbæk and Ringsted on the island of Zealand, Denmark.

Hvalsø railway station is situated on the Northwest Line from Roskilde to Kalundborg. The station opened in 1874. It offers regional rail services to Holbæk, Roskilde and Copenhagen operated by the national railway company DSB.

== History ==
Hvalsø railway station opened on 30 December 1874 as one of the original intermediate stations on the Northwest Line between Roskilde and Kalundborg.

Hvalsø became a short-lived railway junction in the period when the Central Zealand railway line between Ringsted and Frederikssund crossed the Northwest Line here. The section from Ringsted to Hvalsø opened on 15 August 1925, and the section from Hvalsø to Frederikssund opened on 17 November 1928, but both sections were already closed on 15 May 1936.

== Architecture ==
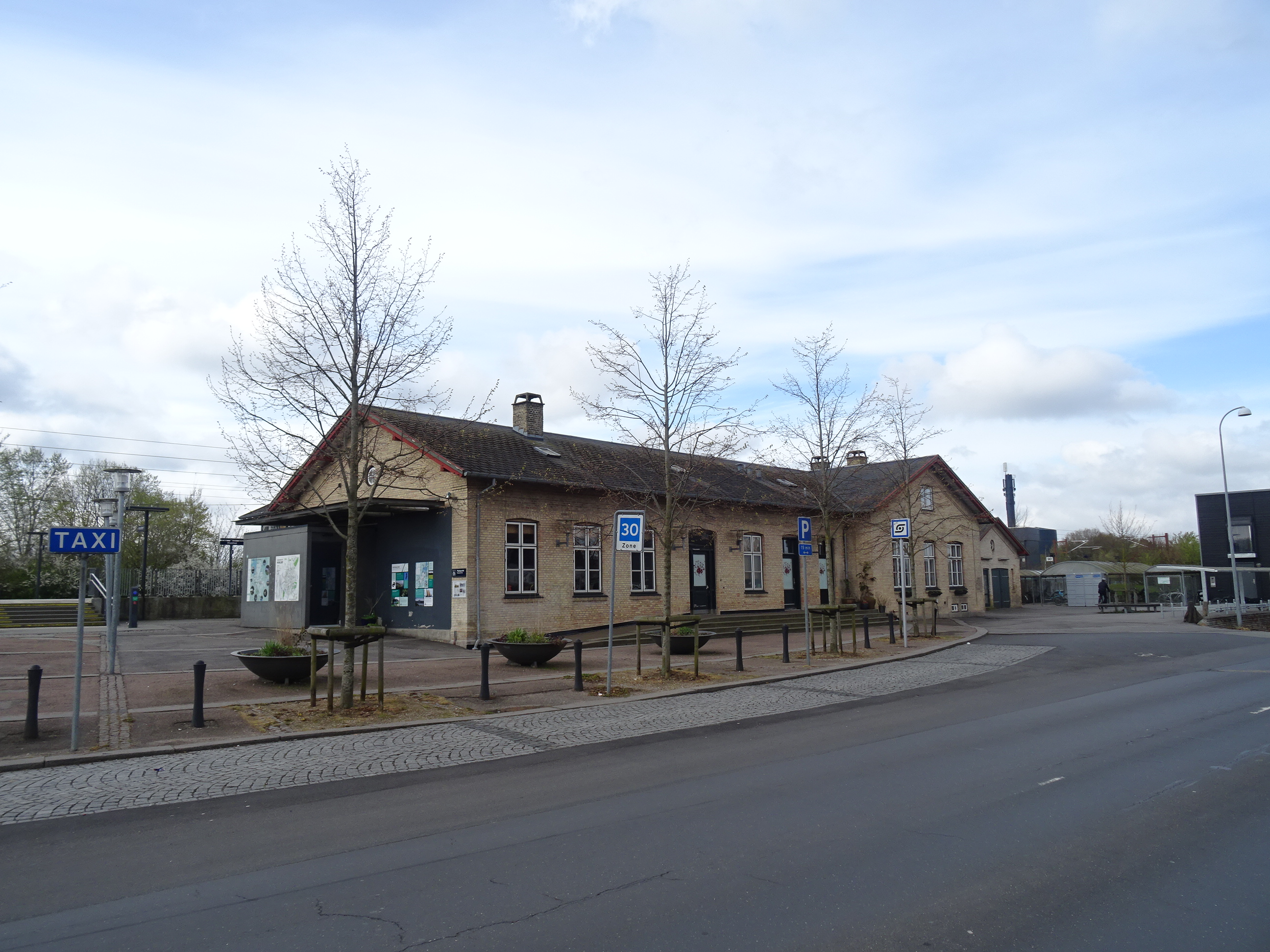
Street facade of the station building in 2024.

The original and still existing station building from 1874 was designed by the Danish architect Niels Peder Christian Holsøe (1826–1895), known for the numerous railway stations he designed across Denmark in his capacity of head architect of the Danish State Railways.

== Services ==
The station offers frequent regional rail services to Holbæk, Roskilde and Copenhagen operated by the national railway company DSB.

== Gallery ==
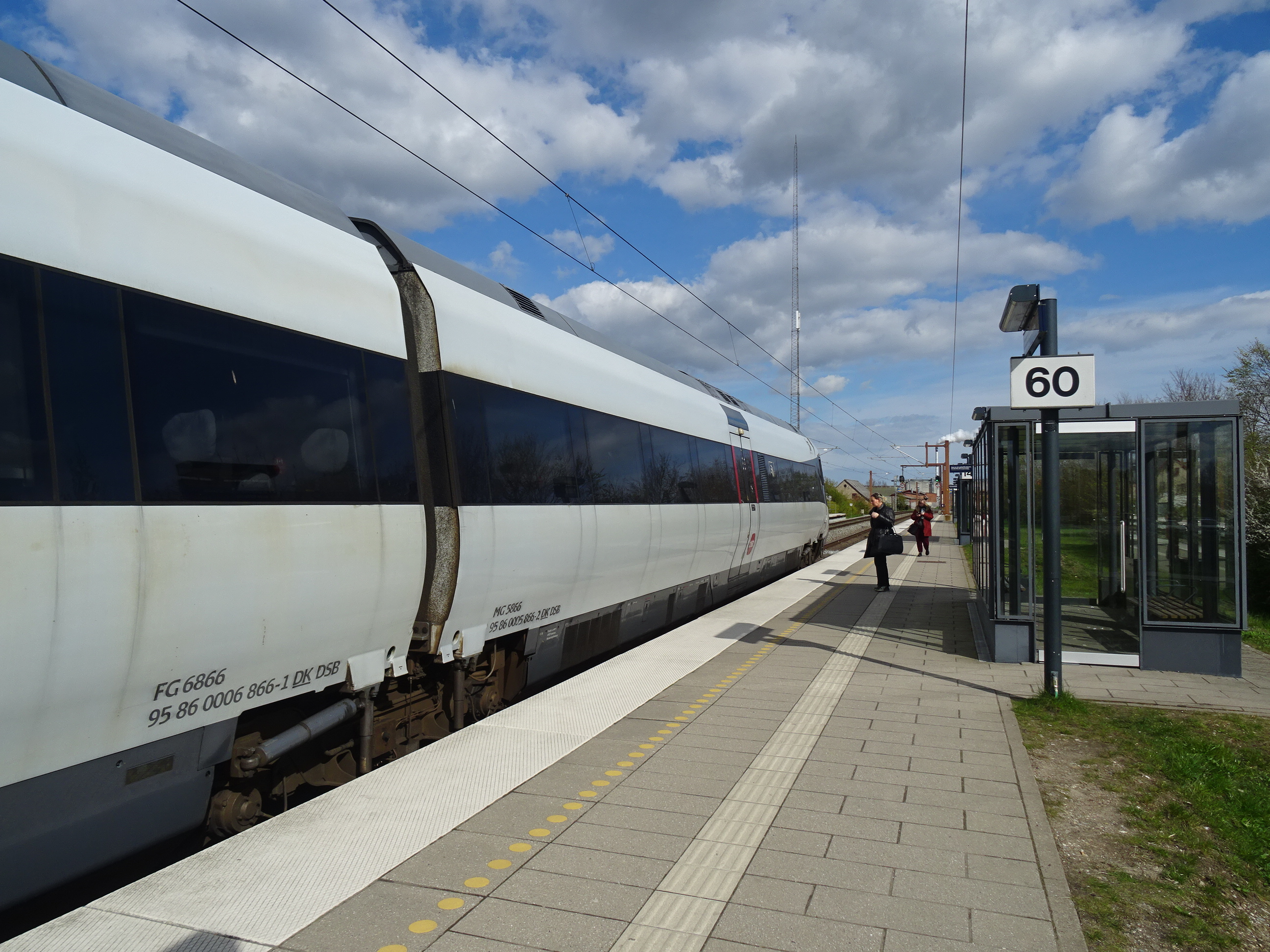
DSB train calling at Hvalsø in 2024

== See also ==
- List of railway stations in Denmark
- Rail transport in Denmark
- History of rail transport in Denmark
