= Lejre =

- Town
- Location in Denmark Lejre (Denmark Region Zealand)
- Coordinates: 55°36′16″N 11°58′30″E
- Country: Denmark
- Region: Region Zealand
- Municipality: Lejre Municipality

Area
  - Urban: 1.8 km^{2} (0.69 sq mi)

Population (2026)
  - Urban: 3,429
  - Urban density: 1,900/km^{2} (4,900/sq mi)
- Time zone: UTC+1 (CET)
  - Summer (DST): UTC+2 (CEST)
- Postal code: DK-4320 Lejre

Lejre is a railway town in the northwestern part of the island of Zealand in eastern Denmark. It has a population of 3,429 (1 January 2026).

The town is located in Lejre Municipality (Danish: Lejre Kommune) in Region Zealand. The town's Old Norse name was Hleiðr or Hleiðargarðr.

== Lejre Municipality ==
Lejre municipality has an area of 240 km^{2} and a total population of ca. 26,989 (2014), and the municipal seat is Kirke Hvalsø.

== History ==
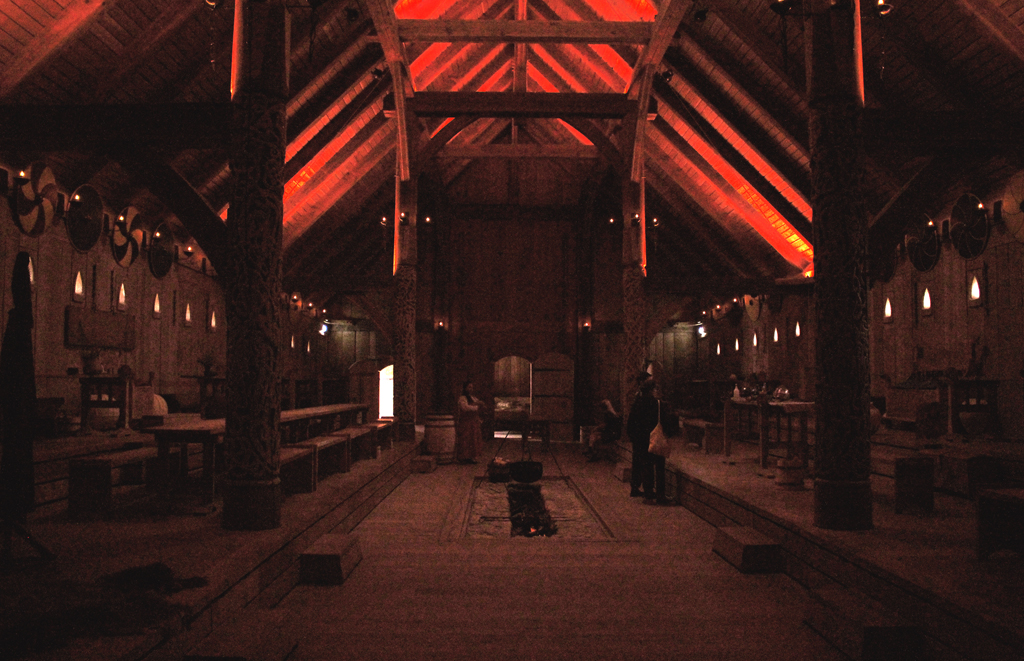
Interior of the reconstructed King's Hall at Lejre, Denmark, c. 8th century

Lejre's role in Danish history can be compared to that of Gamla Uppsala in Sweden. Moreover, it has long been thought to have been the real-world counterpart to Heorot, the hall of King Hrothgar at the centre of the action in the Old English epic poem Beowulf.

Lejre is sometimes assumed to have been the capital of a putative Iron Age kingdom sometimes referred to as the "Lejre Kingdom." According to early legends, it was ruled by kings of the Skjöldung dynasty, predecessors of the kings of medieval Denmark. Legends of the kings of Lejre are known from a number of medieval sources, including the twelfth-century Gesta Danorum written by Saxo Grammaticus and the anonymous twelfth-century Chronicon Lethrense, or Chronicle of Lejre. As the home of the Skjölding (Old English: Scylding) dynasty mentioned in Beowulf, Lejre has long been thought to have been the real-world counterpart to Heorot, the fabulous royal hall where the first part of the action of that Anglo-Saxon poem takes place. Among other works of the medieval imagination that tell of adventures at Lejre, the best known is the fourteenth-century Icelandic Saga of King Hrolf Kraki.

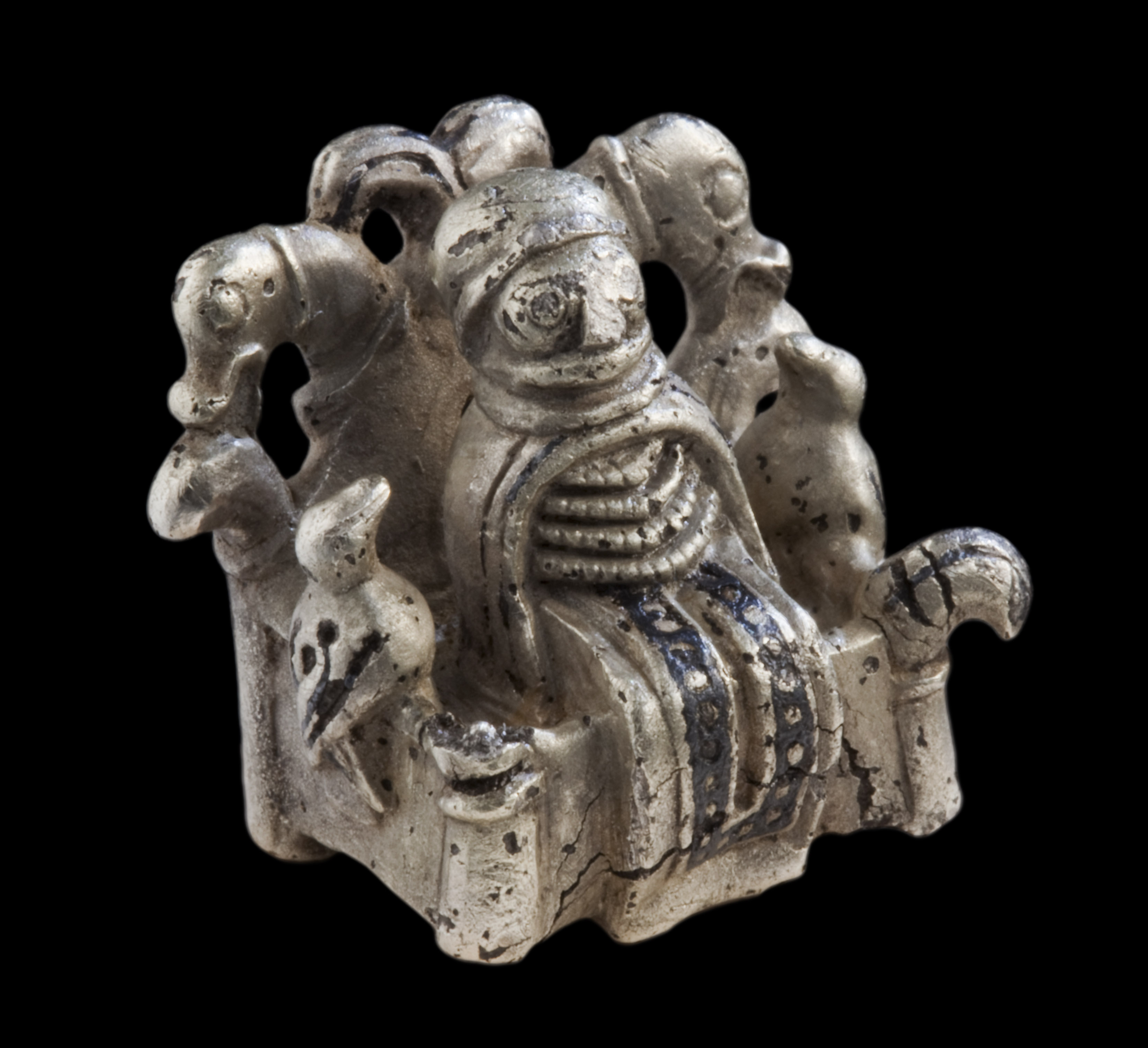
'Odin from Lejre' silver figurine, c. 900 AD

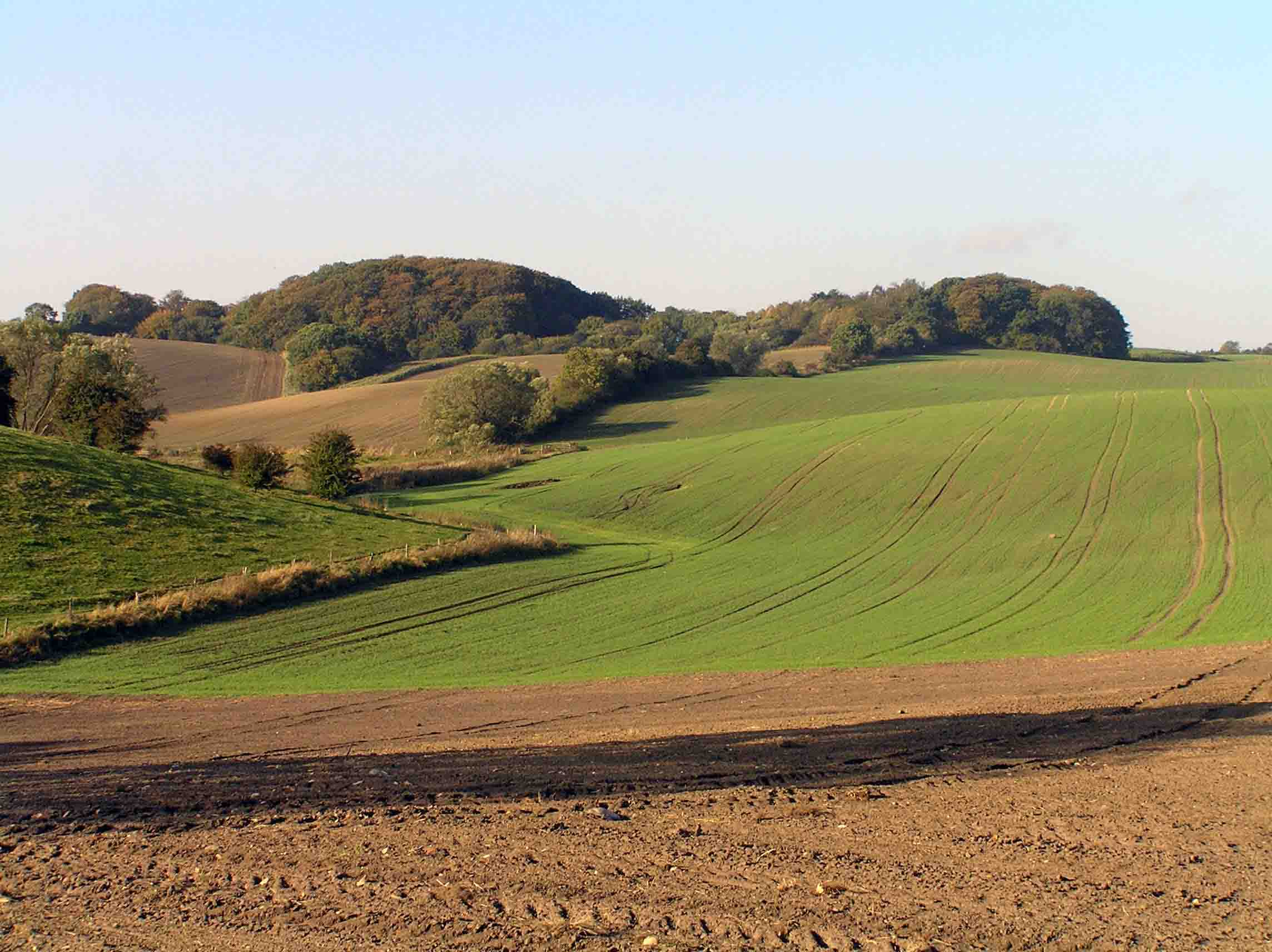
View west from the earliest hall site

Archeological excavations undertaken since the 1980s have produced dramatic confirmation that medieval legends of Lejre, though largely fabulous, have a basis in history. Research teams led by archaeologist Tom Christensen of Roskilde Museum have uncovered the remains of an extensive Iron Age and Viking Age settlement complex just outside the hamlet of Gammel Lejre ("Old Lejre"). Discovered here were the post-holes for a series of large rectangular buildings measuring fifty to sixty meters in length or more. These must have been the halls of powerful magnates or kings. Outbuildings and other structures whose remains were unearthed in this same area indicate that Lejre was also a center for crafts, commerce, and religious observances. The relative absence of weapon finds suggests that the site was more important as a social and economic center than as a military base. A noteworthy loose find that has recently turned up, thanks to metal detector work, is a tiny silver Viking Age figurine known as Odin from Lejre. This is thought to depict the god Odin enthroned in majesty between ravens.

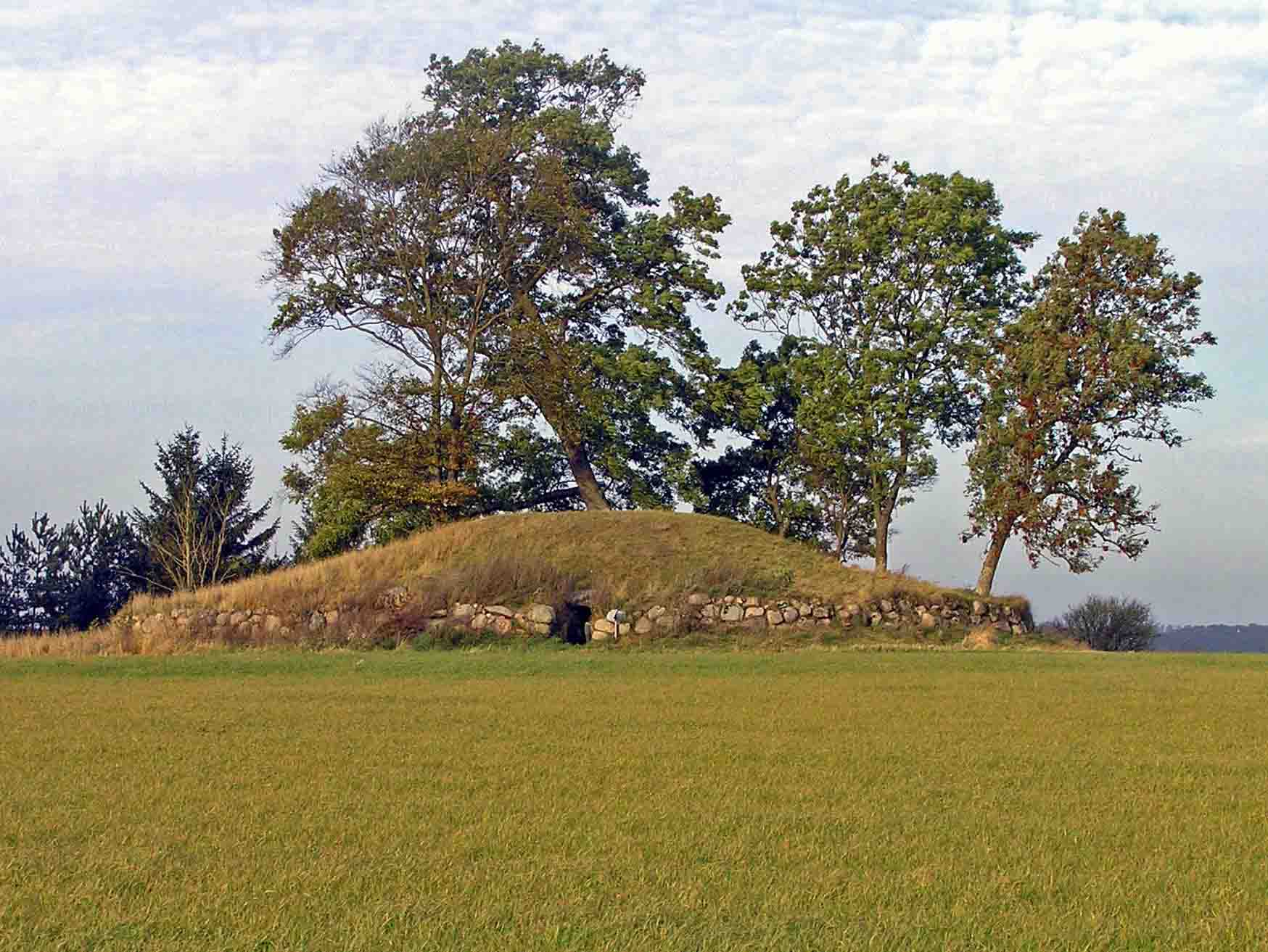
Øm jættestue: Neolithic passage grave near Gammel Lejre.

Other sites of archaeological interest in the vicinity, long admired by visitors even when their nature was not well understood, are a Viking-Age cemetery that includes several ship settings, a great Iron Age cremation mound ("Grydehøj"), a number of tumuli that are mostly of Bronze Age date, and several Neolithic chamber graves, including one that in modern times has been known as "Harald Hildetandshøy". As for the Iron Age archaeological settlement complex unearthed since the 1980s, its two related parts span the period from about 550 to about 1000 AD, thus confirming the significance of this "land of legends" over a period of almost half a millennium, up to the time when Denmark was converted to Christianity and a new royal capital was established at what is now the cathedral city of Roskilde.

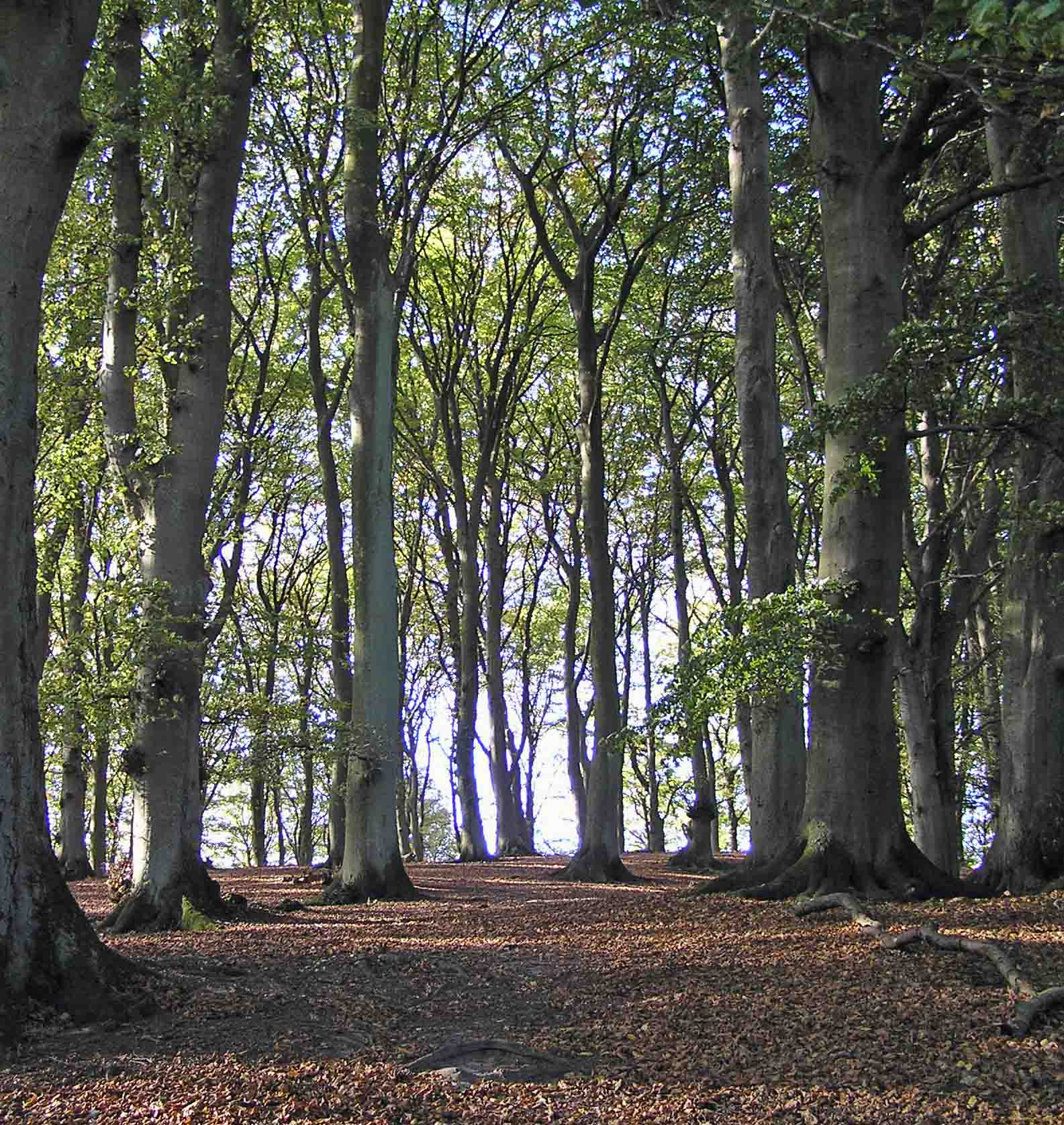
Beech grove in hilly ground west of Lejre

On account of its imposing monuments as well as its unusual surrounding terrain, Gammel Lejre has long been a focal point for antiquarian scholarship, a source of Danish national pride, and a source of fascination regarding Scandinavian prehistory. Speculations about the prehistory of the area have been fueled by Thietmar of Merseburg's account in his twelfth-century Chronicon (ch. 17) that pagan sacrifices were formerly held every ninth year at Lejre. A wooded path and lake a short distance west of Lejre, as well, was identified by some antiquarian scholars as "Herthadal," the sacred sacrificial precinct of the goddess Nerthus (also called Hertha), whose rites were described by the Roman historian Tacitus in chapter 40 of his Germania. While such speculations can be dismissed as contributing to a "myth of Lejre" that has little to do with the actual Iron Age settlement-complex that has now been excavated, it could be argued that reality and fantasy have always been intertwined in stories pertaining to this region.

== Attractions ==
Lejre Municipality is home to the Land of legends (Sagnlandet Lejre), a center for experimental archaeology and education, which includes reconstructions and recreations from different periods of Denmark's history— from pre-history to the Viking Age. The centerpiece of the facility is an Iron Age village reconstruction, complete with sacrificial bog. The center is open to the public.

Ledreborg, a palatial Baroque mansion, also lies in the vicinity.

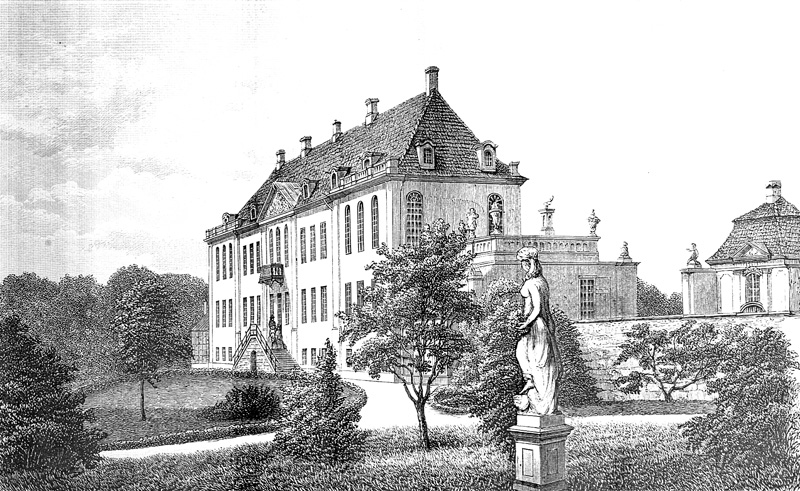
Ledreborg Palace, 19th-century drawing

Lejre Stadion, an association football stadium built in 1989.

== Transport ==
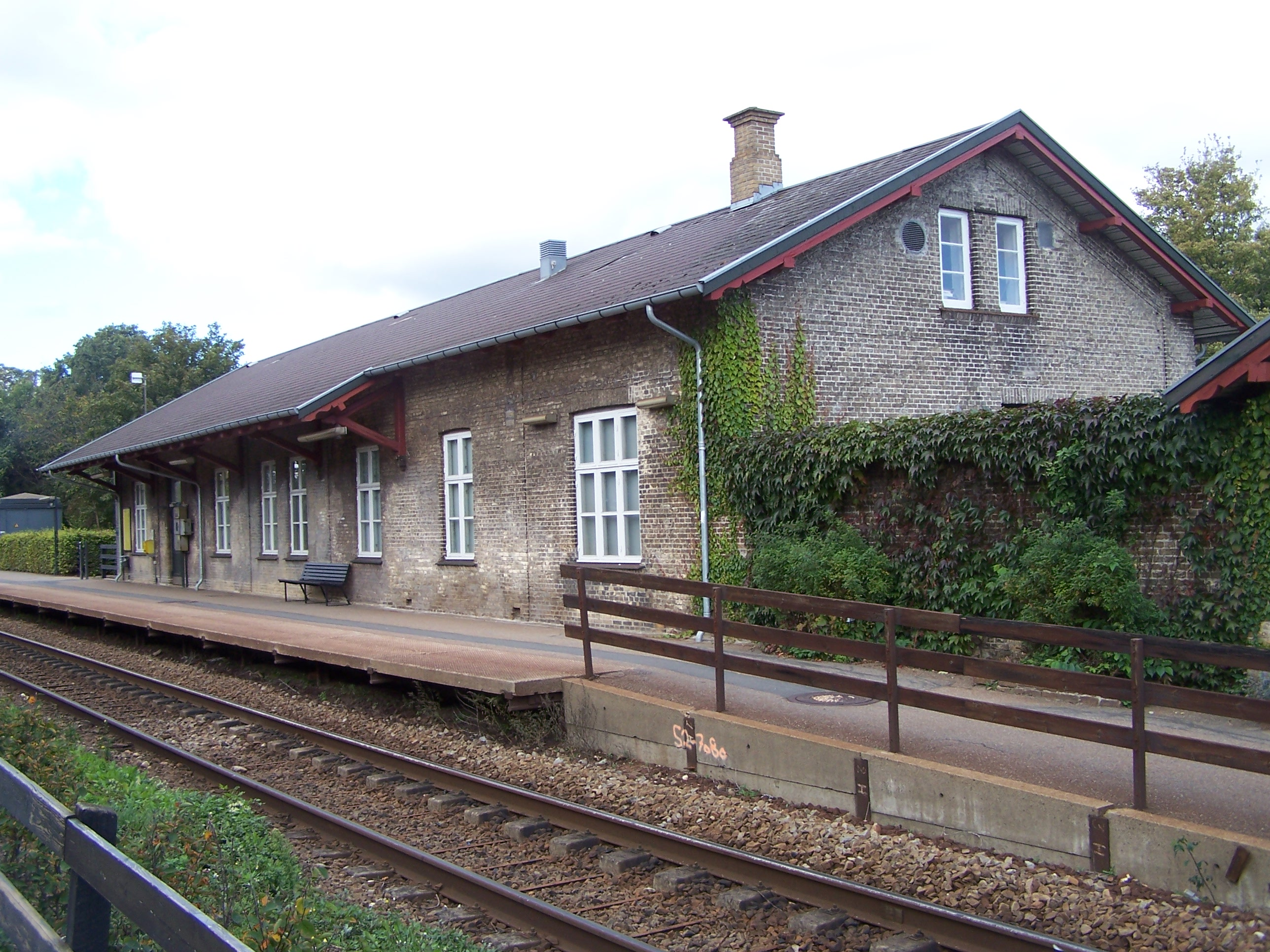
Lejre railway station

Lejre is served by Lejre railway station located on the railway line between Roskilde and Holbæk.

== Notable people ==
- Maria Helsbøl (born 1989 in Lejre) a Danish badminton player
- Carl-Emil Lohmann (born 2001 in Lejre) a Danish actor, dancer, singer and voice artist
