= Eyrarland Statue =

Bronze statue from about AD 1000 found in the area of Akureyri, Iceland

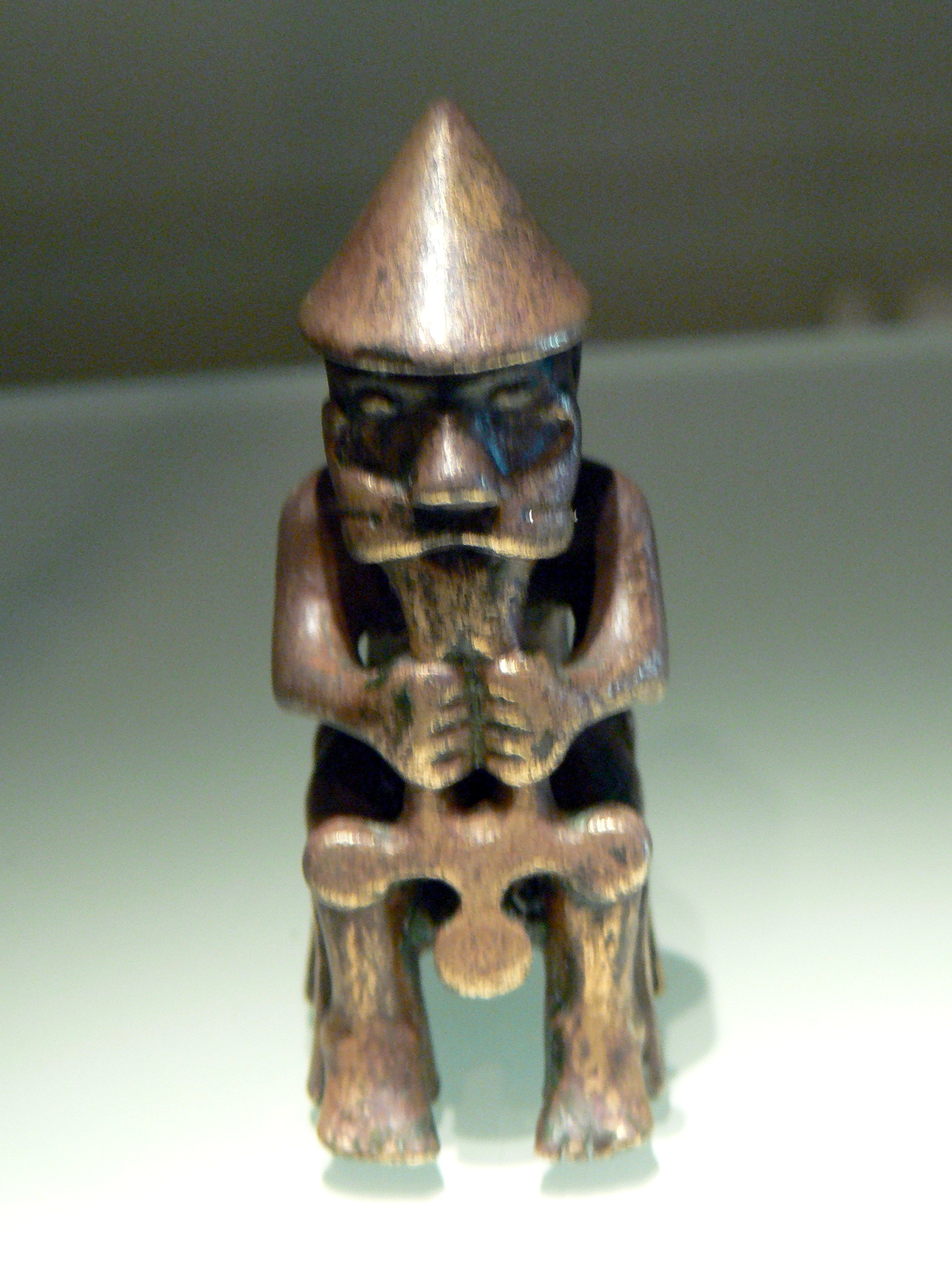
The Eyrarland Statue of Thor found in Iceland

The Eyrarland Statue is a bronze statue of a seated figure (6.7 cm) from about AD 1000 that was recovered at the Eyrarland farm in the area of Akureyri, Iceland. The object is a featured item at the National Museum of Iceland. The statue may depict the Norse god Thor and/or may be a gaming-piece.

The statue was unearthed in 1815 or 1816 on one of two farms called Eyrarland in the vicinity of Akureyri.

If the object is correctly identified as Thor, Thor is holding his hammer, Mjölnir, sculpted in the typically Icelandic cross-like shape. It has been suggested that the statue is related to a scene from the Poetic Edda poem Þrymskviða where Thor recovers his hammer while seated by grasping it with both hands during the wedding ceremony. Another suggestion comes from the archeologist Kristján Eldjárn, who has written that it could be the central piece from a set of hnefatafl, based on its similarities to a smaller whalebone figure discovered in Baldursheimur together with black and white gaming pieces and a die.

== See also ==
- Odin from Lejre
- Rällinge statuette
