= Roskilde Museum of Tools =

Museum in Roskilde, Denmark

Coordinates: 55°38′24″N 12°04′34″E

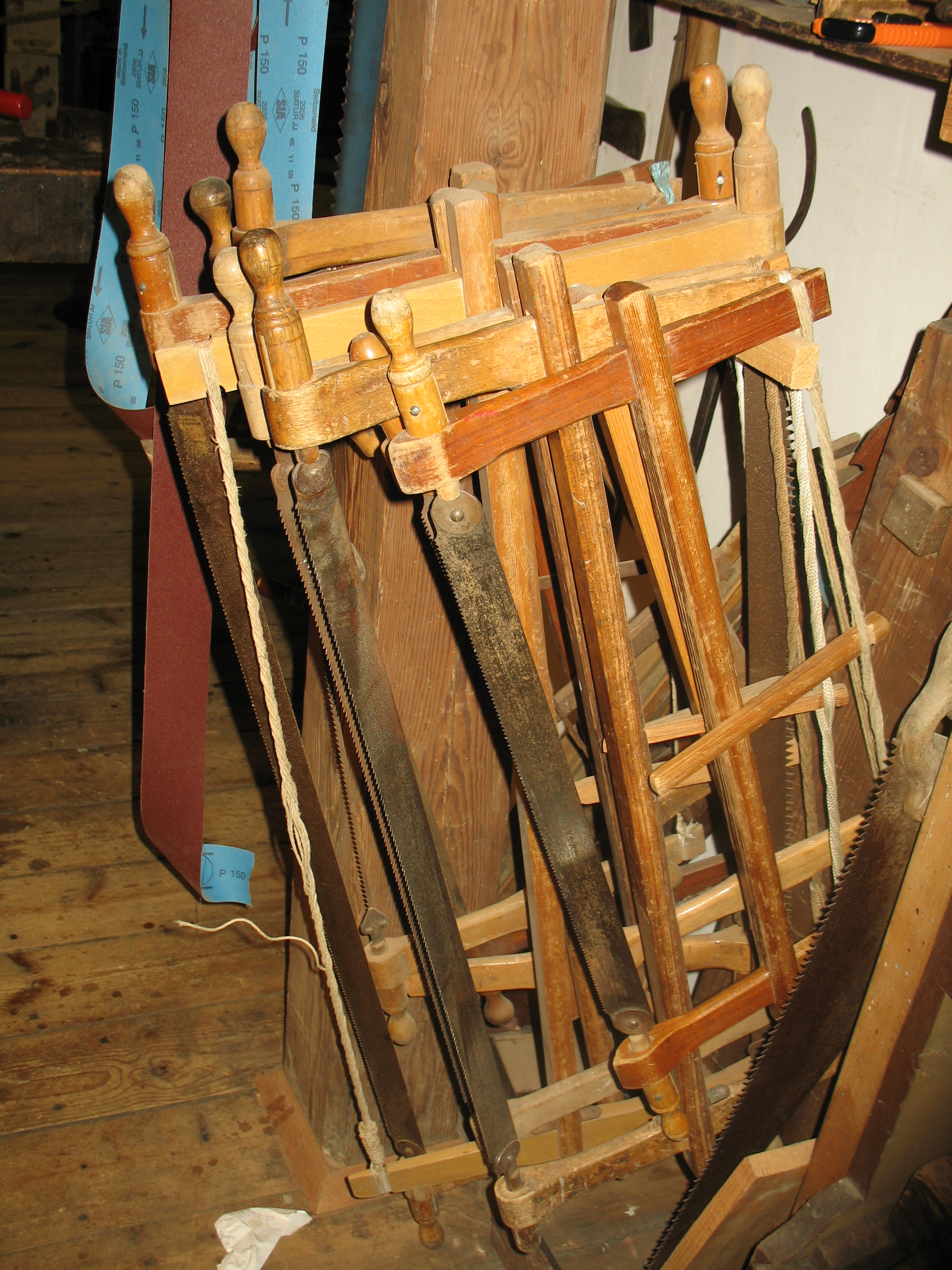
Handsaws in the Museum of Tools

The Roskilde Museum of Tools (Danish: Roskilde Håndværksmuseet) is a branch of Roskilde Museum located on Ringstedgade in Roskilde, Denmark. It contains a collection of tools used by craftsmen such as wheelwrights, carpenters, shoemakers and wood carvers from around 1850 to 1950. Visitors to the museum, housed on the first floor of a former granary known as Lützhøfts Købmandsgård, can also visit the operational private workshops of a wood carver, a silversmith and a weaver. The museum was opened in 1977.
