= Roskilde Museum =

Cultural history museum in Roskilde, Denmark

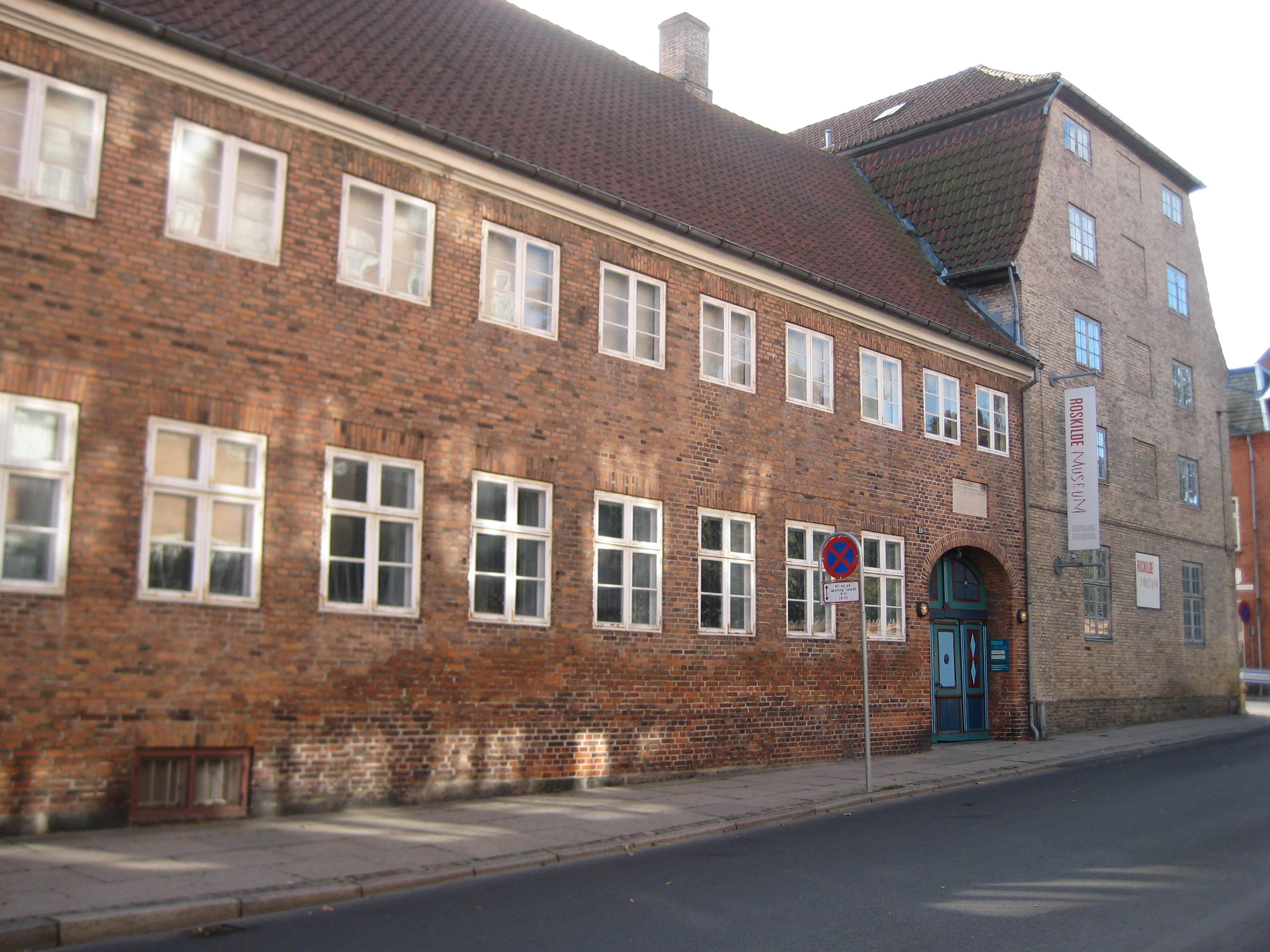
- The Sugar House
- Location: Roskilde, Denmark
- Coordinates: 55.6425°N 12.0834°E
- Visitors: 47m120
- Director: Frank Birkebæk
- Website: www.roskildemuseum.dk

Roskilde Museum is a local history museum based in Roskilde, Denmark. The museum, which is run by the municipalities of Roskilde, Frederikssund and Lejre, has eight separate branches. The main branch in Roskilde, on the corner of Sankt Olsgade and Sankt Olsstræde, is based in two listed buildings, the Sugar House and the Liebe House, a former sugar refinery and a former merchant's house respectively.

== History ==
=== The Sugar House ===
The sugar house was built by a consortium led by Johan Jørgen Holst as a facility for the processing of raw sugar from the Danish West Indies. The other investors, a combination of businessmen from Copenhagen and local merchants, were members of his family.

The sugar company also had its own ship, Roskilde Ark. After pressure from the sugar company the city agreed to construct a new pier which enabled the ship to continue all the way to Roskilde. Larger vessels had formerly only been able to travel as far up Roskilde Fjord as Frederikssund where goods had to be transferred onto smaller boats. Roskilde Ark, also known as the Sugar Ship, brought raw sugar and coal to the factory and shipped processed sugar to ports on Zealand where it was sold. The company could not sell its sugar in Copenhagen and other towns that had their own refineries and only in portions of at least 20 pounds.

In 1764, the factory employed a bookkeeper, a sugar master by the name of Niels Andersen Breegaard, four workers, three boys, one farmhand and a woman who catered for the other employees. The factory complex also included a building with residences for the employees.

The "Sugar Ship" called on most harbours on Zealand. A dispute between Holst and Breegaard led to Holst's withdrawal from the company in 1765. A few years later, in 1768, it was sold to Johan Conrad Kersting and Peter Wasserfall. In 1774 the factory had 7–10 employees and processed 300 to 400 barrels of raw sugar (each containing 400 kg) a year. Shortly thereafter the production began to drop and the factory had to close in 1779.

The property was then acquired by Jacob Borch, a merchant, who used the sugar factory as storage for his grocer's shop in Algade.

Ub 1671 ri 1689m it belonged to Jacob Olsen Elsberg,

=== Liebe House ===
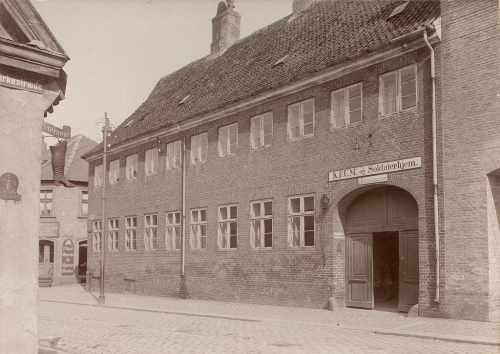
The Liebe House in 1905

In 1804, Jacob Borch constructed a large house on the site next to the sugar factory. It replaced a modest house with timber framing and a straw roof dating from the 17th century. The name of the building refers to the Liebe family that owned the property for two generations later in the century.

=== 20th century ===
On the occasion of his death in 1900, Liebe left the entire building complex to Roskilde Municipality. In 1908, the Sugar House came into use as a fire station. Roskilde Local History Museum was founded on 12 November 1929 on the ground floor of the Liebe House. When the fire station moved to new premises in 1989, Roskilde Museum took over the Sugar House.

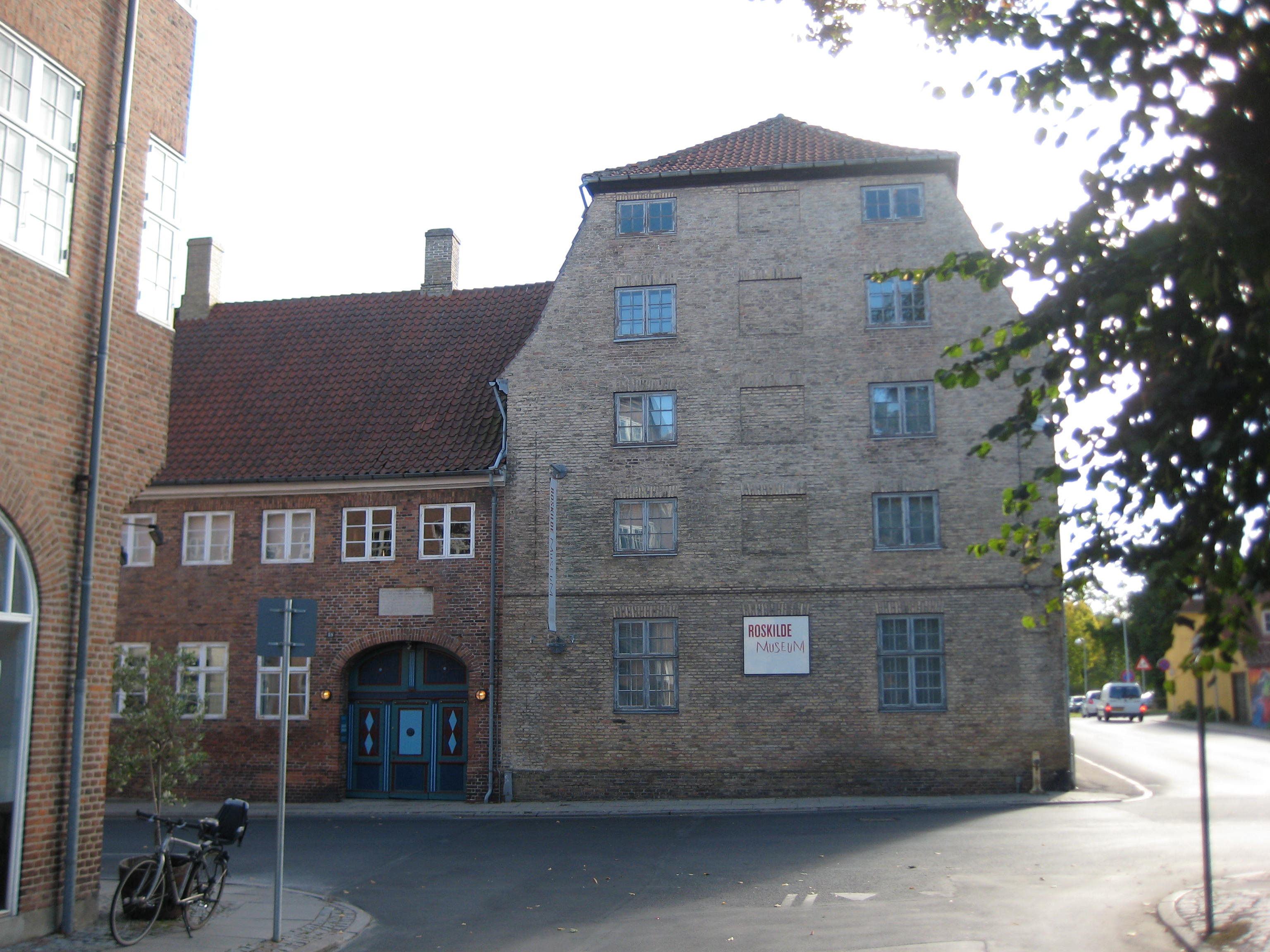
The gable of Liebe House

== Architecture ==
The Sugar House is built in yellow brick on Sankt Olsstræde. Above the gate is a memorial plaque. It is the only surviving building of its kind in Denmark. The Liebe House is built in red brick and has a half-hip roof. Both buildings were listed in 1918 and the scope of the listing was extended in 1978.

== Other departments ==
=== Living museum shops ===
Roskilde Museum runs two living museum shops in Ringstedgade in Roskilde. Lützhøfts Købmandsgård is a grocer's shop which opened in 1892 and remained in operation until 1979. Roskilde Museum reopened it in 1982 and has restored its interior to resemble a grocer's shop from 1920. The shop features more than a 1,000 products. Those that are on sale are similar to the ones that were sold in the 1920s. It is also possible to visit the merchant's office and storage room. Several storage buildings from the 18th and 19th century are located in the yard.

Next door is a butcher's shop from the same period. The interior is from H. Sloth's store in Fredericia.

=== Museum of Tools ===
The Museum of Tools (Håndværksmuseet) contains a collection of tools used by craftsmen from different trades from c. 1850 to c. 1950. It is housed on the first floor of a former granary at Lützhøfts Købmandsgård. Three craftsmen – a wood carver, a silversmith and a weaver – also have their workshops on the premises.

=== Tadre Watermill ===
Tadre Watermill (Tadre Mølle is one of few watermills on Zealand that can still be seen in operation. It is the last of 13 watermills that once operated on the Aastrup Estate near Kirke Hvalsø. The buildings are from 1840.

=== Roskilde Cathedral visitor centre ===
Roskilde Museum also runs the visitor centre at Roskilde Cathedral.

=== Museums for Lejre, Gundsø and Frederikssund ===
Lejre Museum covers the local history of Lejre. Fjordcenter Jyllinge is dedicated to the local history of Gundsø, that is the northernmost part of Roskilde Municipality. Færgegården in Frederikssund is a local history museum for Frederikssund Municipality.

=== Ragnarock Museum ===
The Ragnarock is a museum dedicated to Danish rock music and other contemporary genre. The design competition for the museum was won by MVRDV in collaboration with COBE Architects. It opened on April 29, 2016.
