= Carl-Emil Lohmann =

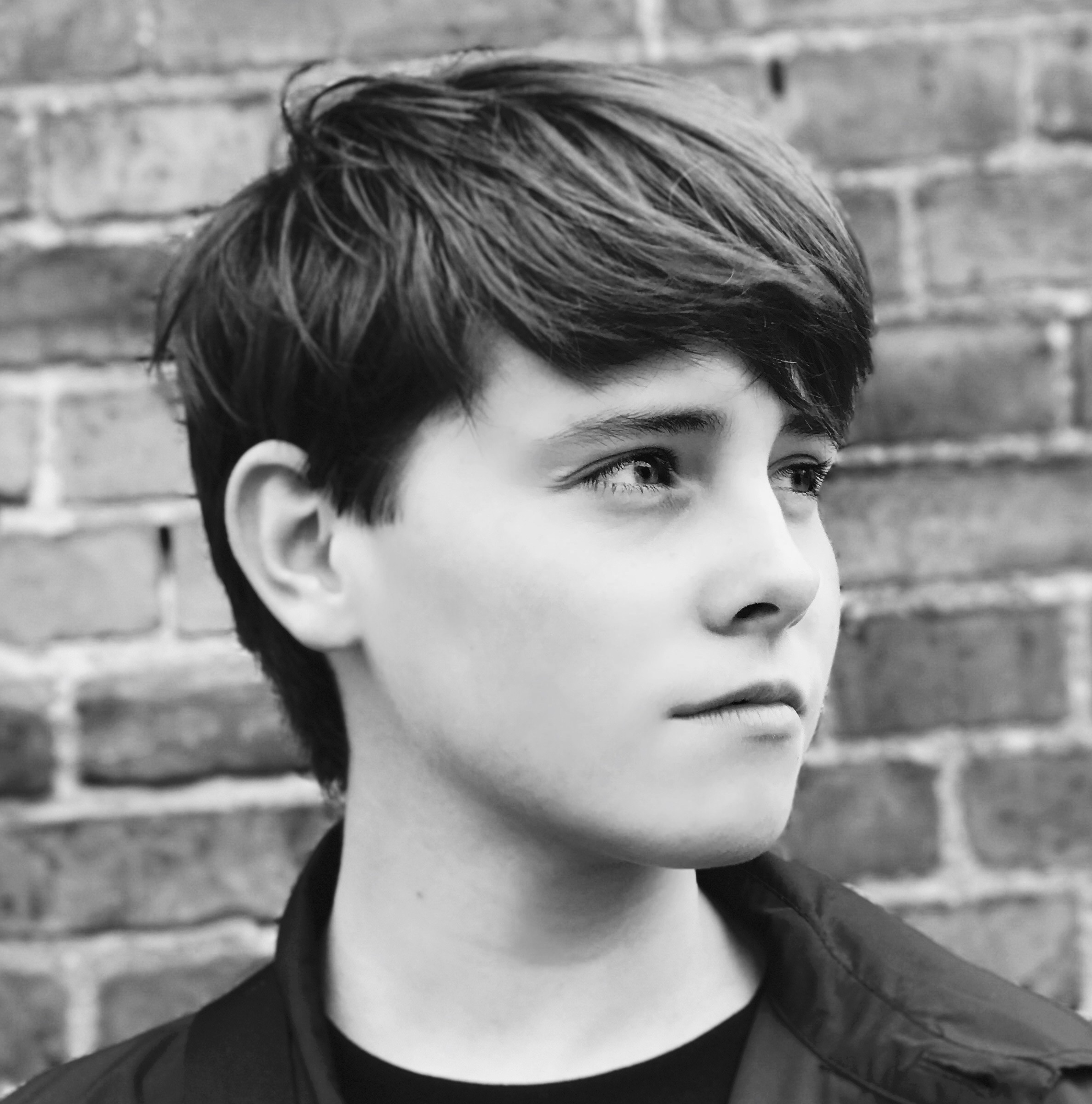

Background information
- Occupations: singer; dancer; voice actor
- Years active: 2014–present
- Labels: Copenhagen Records

Carl-Emil Lohmann is a Danish actor, dancer, singer and voice artist from Lejre, Lejre Municipality. He performed as the 84th Billy Elliot in Billy Elliot the Musical in Denmark at Det Ny Teater in Copenhagen.

== Career ==
He started to show interest in theater from an early age and started theater with his sister Sofie Lohmann by attending performing arts school named Scene Kunst Skoler in Roskilde, Denmark from the age of seven. Since then he starred in six musical theater shows including: Love Never Dies (As Gustave), Evita (As Fredrich), Billy Elliott (As Billy Elliot), Sound of Music, Jekyl & Hyde and Annie Get Your Gun (As Little Jake) at Det Ny Teater, Copenhagen, Denmark. He also appeared in the Backgammon as young Erik in 2014.

He sang O Hellige Nat (O Holy Night) as a part of TV2 Alletiders Juleshow with Aalborg Symphony Orchestra at Musikkens Hus, recorded for TV2.

Lohmann performed as dubbing artist (from 2015) in nineteen different Danish animation and Animation series like: Kubo, Bunk’d, Dyrene i Hakkebakkeskoven, Find Dory, Løvernes Garde (da), Miles Fra Morgendagen and Ronja Røverdatter.
