= Sara Blædel =

Danish writer

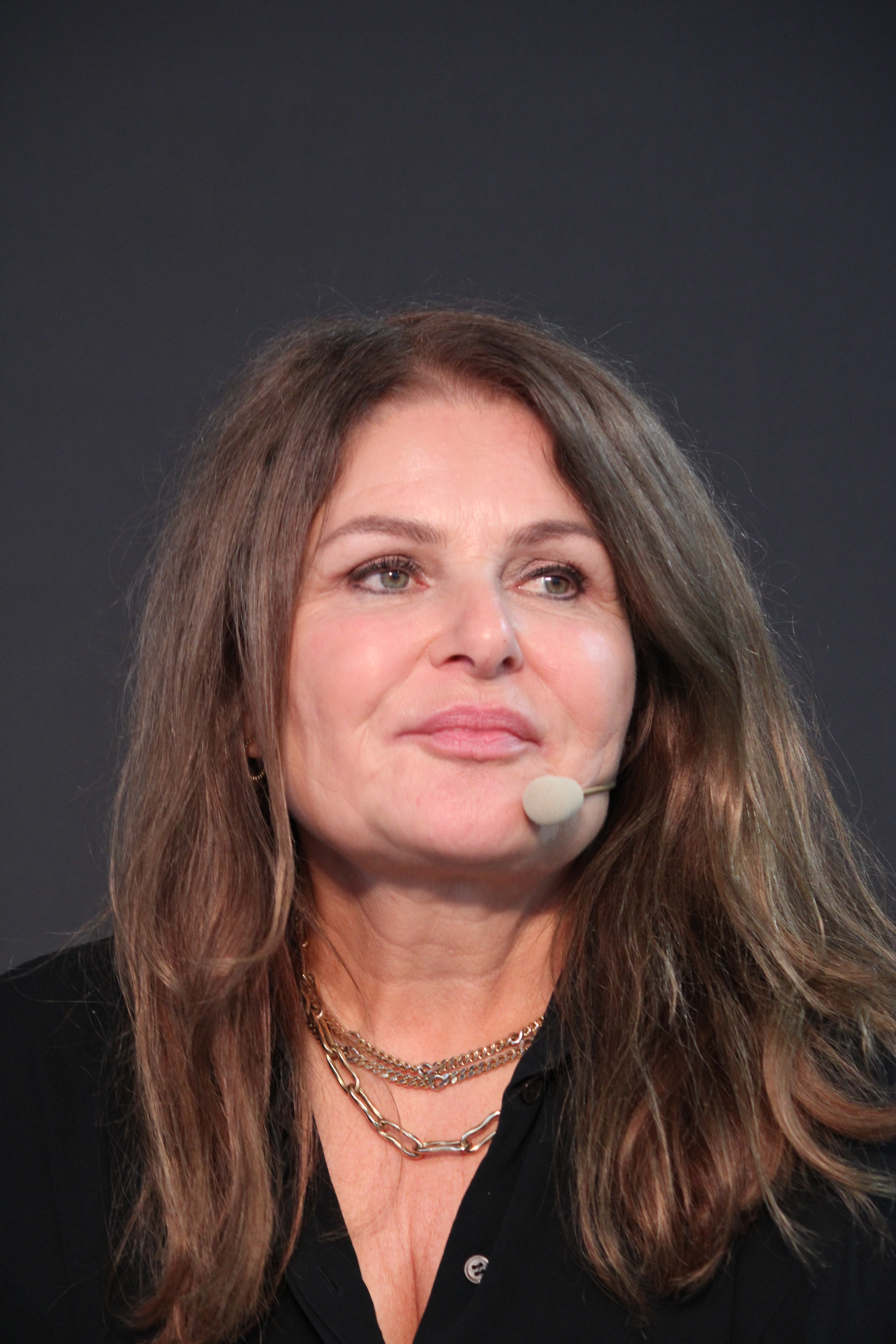
- Blædel in 2025
- Born: 6 August 1964 (age 62); Copenhagen, Denmark
- Occupation: Novelist
- Writing career
- Genres: Crime fiction, thriller
- Website: www.sarablaedel.com

Sara Blædel (born 6 August 1964) is a Danish author. She is best known for her crime fiction novels featuring Louise Rick. Blædel founded the "Sara B" crime fiction publishing company in 1993, and in 1995 she started to work as a journalist.

== Personal life ==
Blædel was born in Copenhagen and grew up in Hvalsø, Denmark. She is the daughter of journalist Leif Blædel and actress Annegrethe Nissen.

== Novels ==
Her novels have been published in 31 countries.

=== Scandinavia ===
Blædel's first novel was Grønt støv, first published in Denmark in 2004, followed by Kald mig prinsesse (2005), Kun ét liv (2007), Aldrig mere fri (2008), Hævnens gudinde (2009), Dødsengelen (2010), and De glemte piger (2011). Until 2008, Blædel's books were published in Denmark by Lindhardt and Ringhof. Since 2008, her publisher has been People's Press.

Blædel's publications in other Scandinavian countries include:

- Sweden: Aldrig mera fri (2009), De bortglömda (2012)
- Norway: De glemte pikene (2013), Bare ett liv (2009), Kall meg prinsesse (2007), Grönt støv (2007)
- Finland: Nimimerkki Prinsessa (2013), Vain yksi elämä (2014), Hyvästit vapaudelle (2015)
- Iceland: Hefndargyðjan (2011), Aldrei framar frjáls (2010), Aðeins Eitt Líf (2012), Kallaðu Mig Prinsessu

=== North America ===

In May, 2013, Grand Central Publishing bought The Forgotten Girls and the next book in the Louise Rick series.

- United States and Canada: Farewell to Freedom (2012), Only One Life (2012), Call Me Princess (2011), In the Shadow of Sadd (2012; co-written with Steen Langstrup, Gretelise Holm, and Lars Kjaedegaard)

=== Europe ===
- United Kingdom: Blue Blood (2012)
- Germany: Unschuld (2010), Nur ein Leben (2008), Tödliches Schweigen (2006), Grüner Schnee (2006)
- Italy: Mai Più Libera (2012), Le Bambine Dimenticate (2017), La foresta assassina (2018)
- Spain: Sin Salida (2010), Sin Piedad (2011)
- Netherlands: Chatprinses (2010), De vergeten zusjes (2013)
- Poland: Handlarz Śmiercią (2012), Mam na imię Księżniczka (2012), Tylko jedno życie (2013), Pożegnanie wolności (2013)
- Greece: ΠΡΑΣΙΝΗ ΣΚΟΝΗ (2012)
- Hungary: Bízz bennem (2009)
- France: "Les filles oubliées" (2015)

=== Asia ===
- Korea: 콜미 프린세스 (2011)
- Japan: 見えない傷痕 (2012)

== Other publications ==
- Anne-Marie- dronning uden rige (2000)
- Trods modvind - om at komme videre with Hans Engell, Ritt Bjerregaard, Jarl Friis-Mikkelsen, Ditte Gråbøl, Mimi Jacobsen and Flemming Enevold (2002)
- Dødelig alvor with Leif Davidsen (2012)

== Recognition ==
Blædel has been voted Most Popular Author in Denmark four times.
