= Errett Callahan =

American archaeologist (1937–2019)

Errett Callahan (December 17, 1937 – May 29, 2019) was an American archaeologist, flintknapper, and pioneer in the fields of experimental archaeology and lithic replication studies.

== Early life ==
Errett Callahan was born in Lynchburg, Virginia, on December 17, 1937. Callahan’s interest in the outdoors and Native American lifeways began quite early on. As a boy Callahan was a member of the Boy Scouts of America and it was as a Boy Scout that he was first exposed to the skills and techniques that the Native Americans used to survive in the outdoors. His father, who was also his Scoutmaster, played a large role in this, not only imparting his technical knowledge, but also instilling a sense of self-reliance and independence that would shape Errett’s outlook his entire life.

Callahan attended Hampden-Sydney College in Hampden-Sydney, Virginia, from 1956 to 1960. While at Hampden-Sydney Callahan majored in French to better prepare himself for the missionary work in West Africa he hoped to do after graduation. Callahan became a free-lance artist and went instead to East Africa in 1965 where English was readily spoken. He returned to the United States a year later in 1966, where he painted landscapes for three years and then taught art at a prep school for another two.

== Graduate studies ==
In 1969 Callahan enrolled at Virginia Commonwealth University in Richmond, Virginia, where he studied painting and modern art. He received his Master of Fine Arts in 1977. Callahan soon realized that there was very little money to be made in painting and decided to devote himself to his love of primitive technologies.

Callahan attended The Catholic University of America in Washington, D.C., between 1974 and 1981 where he completed his Master’s and doctoral work. Callahan’s work mainly focused on experimentation and replication of aspects of Native American archaeology. His Doctoral dissertation, Pamunkey Housebuilding: an Experimental Study of Late Woodland Technology in the Powatan Confederacy was the culmination of years of experimentation and research into the lifeways of the Powatan people.

== Academic career ==
While at Catholic University, Callahan served as an instructor of anthropology at Virginia Commonwealth University until 1977. It was during this period at Virginia Commonwealth that Callahan pioneered the study of Living Archaeology, teaching classes that combined academic study and research with primitive technological experimentation. With the help of his students, Callahan conducted seven living archaeology experiments over this time period that contributed greatly to both the understanding of native lifeways as well as the field of experimental archaeology itself. The first, the Old Rag project, was an Early Woodland encampment experiment conducted in the Blue Ridge Mountains of Virginia in 1972. At the Old Rag project Callahan and his students produced all of the stone and bone tools used in the construction and subsequent short-term habitation of the site and its dwelling. In 1973, Callahan and his students continued their experimental work at the Wagner Basalt Quarry project in northern Arizona, where they constructed and lived in a reproduction Desert Archaic encampment much in the same way they did at the Old Rag project. After the Wagner Basalt Quarry project, Callahan began an even more ambitious undertaking in 1974 with the multi-phased Pamunkey project. This project, located along the Pamunkey River in Tidewater Virginia, consisted of a series of extended (one month) living experiences in Eastern Middle and Late Woodland encampments of their own construction. As with the previous projects everything used was produced on site, however, the extended nature of this project allowed for a more advanced understanding of Late Woodland technology, which Callahan presented for his Doctoral dissertation, Pamunkey Housebuilding: an Experimental Study of Late Woodland Technology in the Powatan Confederacy.

== Flint knapping and experimental archaeology ==
Callahan first began flint knapping in 1956. He was completely self-taught for the first ten years, learning all he knew through trial and error and by examining the prehistoric artifacts he was trying to recreate. After his first decade of work, he studied with such Master-level flint knappers as Don Crabtree, Gene Titmus, François Bordes, J. B. Sollberger, and Jacques Pelegrin. Along with his continued experimentation and instructions from the masters, Callahan began reading everything he could get his hands on that pertained to flint knapping and primitive technologies. Over the first twenty years of his research Callahan worked his way through the lithic technologies of the European Paleolithic, Paleo-Indian, Archaic, and Woodland traditions of the Americas with another five years spent deciphering the technologies of the European Mesolithic, all the while voluntarily restricting himself to replications of prehistoric forms. Not content to stop there Callahan spent the next twenty years of his life working his way through the complex stone technologies of the European Neolithic. Only after that was Callahan ready to start his work on the Post Neolithic and Non-Traditional technologies where he was once again in uncharted territory, working by trial and error to produce forms that had never been seen before.

== Ethics in experimental archaeology ==
Along with his work in the technological aspects of the field of experimental archaeology, Callahan worked tirelessly to promote ethical research and documentation among fellow experimental archaeologists. Modern forgeries passed off as prehistoric artifacts have been detrimental to the field. Callahan spoke out against such practices, encouraging flint knappers around the world to sign and date all of their production. Callahan also championed authentic and scientific reconstructions, which he defined in his article What is Experimental Archaeology?, as reconstructions which are successful, functional units undertaken with the correct period tools, materials, and procedures and which are scientifically monitored. In this statement, Callahan urged other flint knappers and experimental archaeologists against using modern replica tools such as copper billets to reproduce stone tools instead of the traditional bone and stone hammers used throughout prehistory. Callahan also said in the statement that without proper documentation of the techniques and processes there is no real experiment. With Callahan at the forefront of experimental archaeology, the field of replication studies gained acceptance throughout the academic community.

== Northern Europe ==
In 1972 Errett received a call from Hans-Ole Hansen, founder of the former Lejre Experimental Centre, nowadays Land of legends (Sagnlandet Lejre), in Lejre, Denmark. Hansen had founded the center in the 1960s as an experiment in Denmark’s past. Until Hansen contacted Callahan, the center had dealt mainly with Denmark’s Iron Age. With Callahan’s help, the center pushed back the time periods represented to the Neolithic and Mesolithic. Callahan first traveled to Denmark in 1979, where he conducted a conference that dealt specifically with the archaeology of the area. At the conference he set up a small knapping area where he engaged Danish archaeologists and raised awareness in experimental lithic technology. He returned to Denmark in 1981, this time spending seven months at the Lejre Experimental Centre conducting research into the techniques used to produce the stone tool kit of the Neolithic Danes, including the Neolithic Danish dagger, a highly advanced stone knife originally made to copy the forms of the Bronze daggers being produced in northern and central Europe at that time. Through his research Callahan was the first experimental archaeologist able to reproduce the daggers using traditional techniques. He later compiled his work done in Denmark to be published in a book.

Along with his work in Denmark, Callahan was part of ongoing research into the Swedish Mesolithic and Neolithic as well. His replication study of Middle Sweden’s Mesolithic and Neolithic quartz and quartzite technology and usage, published in An Evaluation of the Lithic Technology in Middle Sweden During the Mesolithic and Neolithic, shed new light on several long standing questions, including population migration, microblade technology, and knapping efficiency vs. waste, faced by Swedish archaeologists who studied the lithic technologies of the area. As a result of his research in Sweden he was awarded an honorary doctorate from the Faculty of Humanities at Uppsala University, Sweden in 1992 and a faculty position in the archaeology department at Uppsala University in Uppsala, Sweden.

== Piltdown productions ==
Upon his return from Northern Europe in 1981 Callahan founded Piltdown Productions as a means to sell his many publications, supplies, and instructional materials, as well as the stone tools and knives he produced. He first used the name, which he took from the infamous Piltdown Man hoax of the early 1900s in which British collector Charles Dawson attempted to pass off the jawbone of an orangutan and fragments of a human skull as an undiscovered human ancestor found in a gravel quarry in Piltdown, England. Callahan first used the Piltdown name in 1974 in a comic strip he drew for Experimental Archaeology Papers, or A.P.E.. In the comic strip he presented a humorous look at the life of a caveman. Callahan wrote two more installments of the comic for the A.P.E. and then for the Newsletter of Experimental Archaeology. During this period, he was also producing documentary and instructional films dealing with various aspects of primitive technology as well as beginner flint knapping kits and tool reproductions that he was sold to universities, colleges, and hobbyists around the country. Callahan produced several catalogue editions that contain not only his stone tool and instructional materials but a good deal of his philosophy and ethical stances towards the field of flint knapping.

Two of the more unusual items to be found in Callahan’s Piltdown Productions inventory are his nontraditional obsidian knives and his obsidian scalpels. The nontraditional obsidian knives, which Callahan began producing in quantities in 1984, were made with the same traditional tools as are his prehistoric replications, but in a variety of shapes and sizes that are not based on any known prehistoric typology. Callahan originally began his work on nontraditional forms out of a desire to break out of the restrictions of traditional stone knife reproductions. His knives won many awards and have often been featured in Blade magazine.

While his nontraditional knives were a way for Callahan to step outside the restrictions of the prehistoric typologies, his obsidian scalpels were a way for him to provide a service to mankind. The technology to make scalpel blades out of smoky obsidian, a volcanic glass that allows for the sharpest blade production, was first developed by Don Crabtree in the late 1970s. The blades, which have edges only a few molecules thick, are 100 to 500 times sharper than the traditional surgical steel scalpels. These ultra-sharp edges produce less scarring and tissue damage and speed the healing process. Though they are not popular in the medical field, Callahan’s obsidian scalpels have been used with great success in hundreds of operations, many performed by doctors and scientists at the University of Michigan Health System who have done extensive research using scalpels produced by Callahan.

== Society of primitive technology ==
Throughout the 1980s the fields of experimental archaeology and lithic replication studies endured some harsh criticisms in the United States from various members of the academic community. These criticisms stemmed mainly from unscrupulous flint knappers attempting to pass their modern reproductions off as authentic prehistoric stone tools. As a result of this many practitioners went into a kind of academic hiding, choosing not to publish the results of their ongoing research. While “in hiding” the field continued to grow with every new technique that was rediscovered and, as Callahan put it in his article What is Experimental Archaeology? “the field was bursting at the seams for expression”. In an effort to bring together members of the community, Callahan invited ten of the leading primitive technology teachers and practitioners to the Schiele Museum of Natural History’s Center for Southeastern Native American Studies in Gastonia, North Carolina, in November 1989. It was at this gathering that The Society of Primitive Technology was founded to promote the practice and teaching of aboriginal skills, foster communication between teachers and practitioners, and to bring about a set of standards for the authenticity, quality and ethics of the research that was being carried out. The society, of which Callahan was president from its inception until he retired his post in 1996, publishes the biannual journal Bulletin of Primitive Technology which includes articles on a variety of experimental archaeological topics including but not limited to stone and bone tools, aboriginal structures, nutrition, clothing, and fire production.

== Cliffside workshops ==
In 1987, Callahan began his Cliffside Workshops as a means to impart the knowledge he learned throughout the years about flint knapping and primitive technology to students and enthusiasts from around the world. Callahan taught the workshops at his Lynchburg, Virginia home, hosting five to ten students at a time. The workshops, which were held in the early summer and fall, mainly covered flint knapping techniques, though Callahan would cover any number of topics associated with the primitive technologies he was well versed in if the students were interested.

== Retirement ==
Upon retiring from flint knapping, Callahan compiled his thirty years of research into the lithic technologies of Scandinavia into one publication. He continued to mentor and instruct students in flint knapping and other primitive technologies at his Lynchburg, Virginia home, as well as occasionally writing articles for the Bulletin of Primitive Technology.

== Death ==
Errett died on May 29, 2019, after complications from Parkinsons.
