= Sagnlandet Lejre =

Open-air archaeology museum in Denmark

Coordinates: 55°36′57″N 11°56′38″E

Lejre Land of Legends
- Sagnlandet Lejre
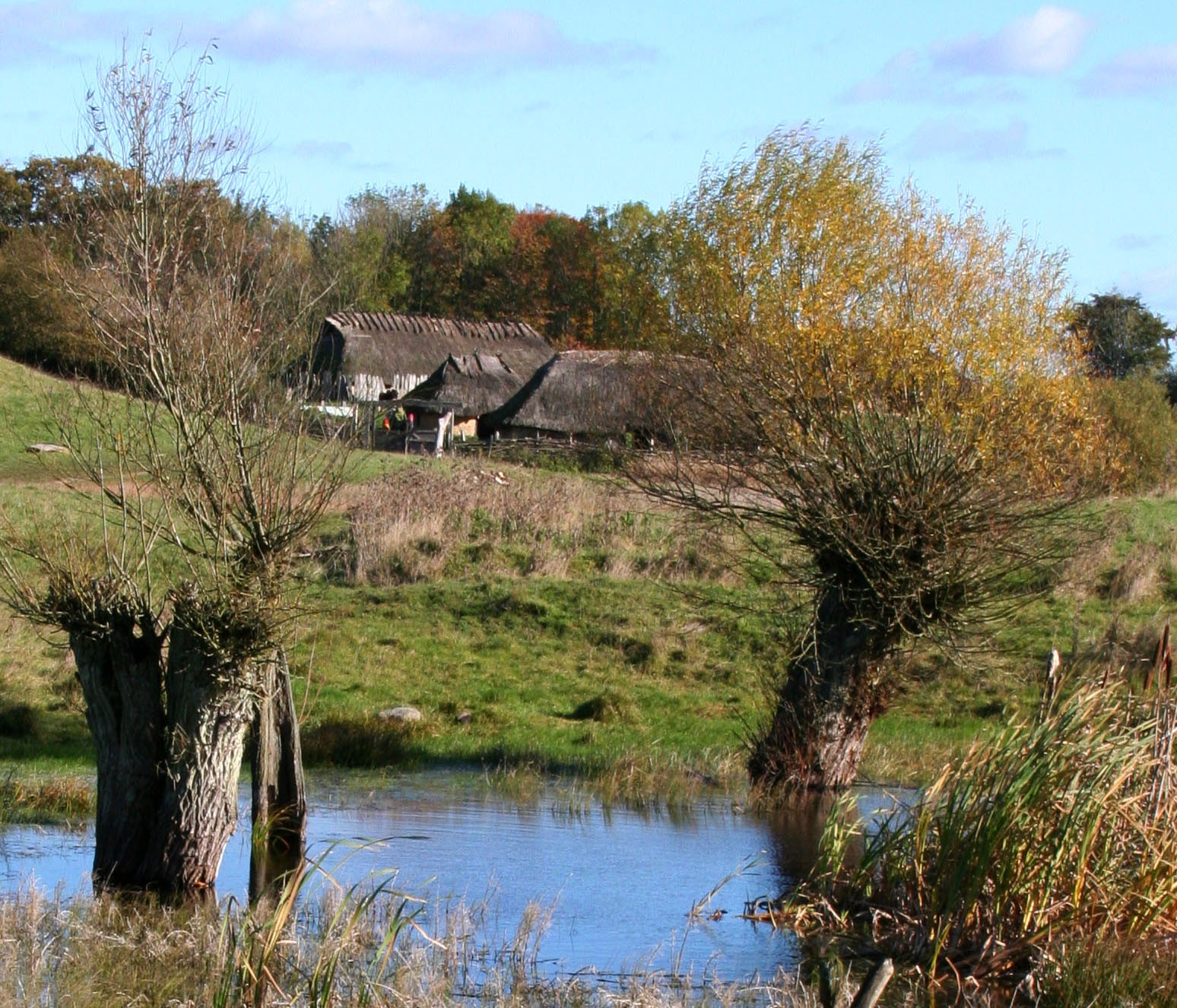
- Sagnlandet Lejre
- Established: 1964
- Location: Lejre Municipality, near Roskilde, Denmark
- Type: Archaeological open-air museum
- Visitors: 55,000 per year
- Website: Official Website

Sagnlandet Lejre or Lejre Land of Legends is an open-air archaeology museum on the island of Zealand in Denmark. It is situated 4 km northwest of the town of Lejre and 1 km west of Gammel Lejre, which was a major political centre in Iron Age Scandinavia. The museum was originally established as a research institute for experimental archaeology and was known as the Centre for Historical-Archaeological Research (Danish: Historisk-arkæologisk Forsøgscenter) until 2009.

== History ==
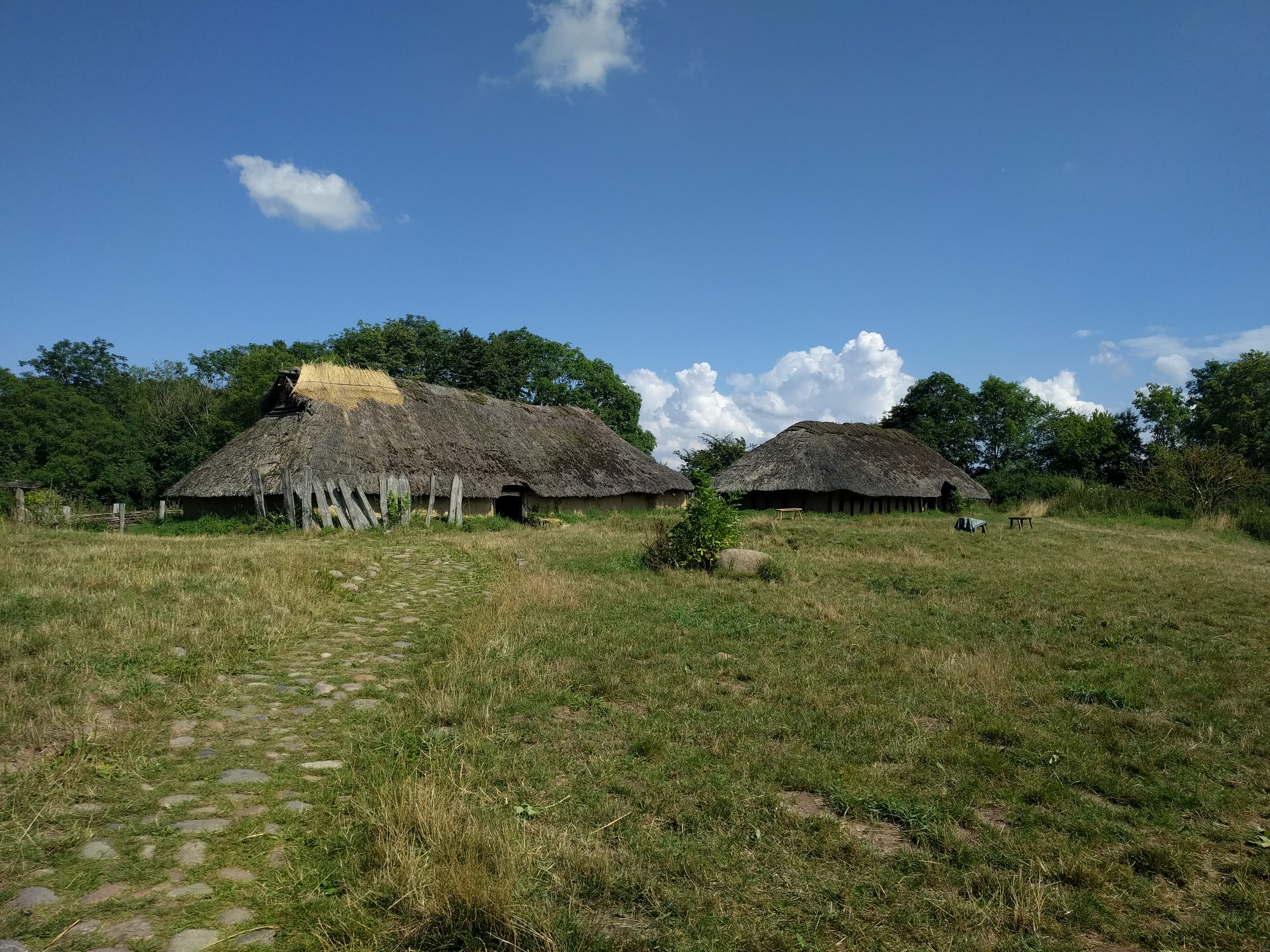
Sagnlandet Lejre

Lejre Land of Legends was formerly known as Centre for Historical-Archaeological Research and Communication (Historisk-arkæologisk Forsøgscenter). It was founded in 1964 by ethnologist Hans-Ole Hansen to create new knowledge of the past through experiments. On March 1, 2009, Lejre Experiment Centre changed its name to Sagnlandet Lejre.

The site comprises reconstructions of an Iron Age village and sacrificial bog (200 BC to 200 AD), a Viking market place (900 AD), a Stone Age campsite (5000 BC), an 18th-century farmstead and various grave monuments. The historical artisan workshops (pottery, weaver's workshop, smithy) work to reproduce pre-historical handicraft. Gardens, pastures and fields are the natural scenario of activities and reconstructions.

Lejre researchers have re-created ancient crafts. Researchers have also explored in detail the ancient methods of food production. Activities for the public utilizes previous techniques, known from historical documents, archaeological evidence or experimental archaeology.

Many archaeologists from all over the world come to Lejre to perform their experiments, dealing with a broad variety of subjects and artifacts. Lejre has also supported the experimental work of Errett Callahan (1937–2019) who was one of the world's most recognised flintknappers.

Around 55,000 tourists and school children visit Lejre each year. Each summer many families spend a week of their holidays in the Iron Age village, the farm cottages and the Stone Age campsite. They dress in period clothing and take on the role of peopling the reconstructed areas, while trying to live using the techniques of the past.

== See also ==
- Middelaldercentret
- Experimental archaeology
