= Hvalsø =

Kirke Hvalsø
- Town
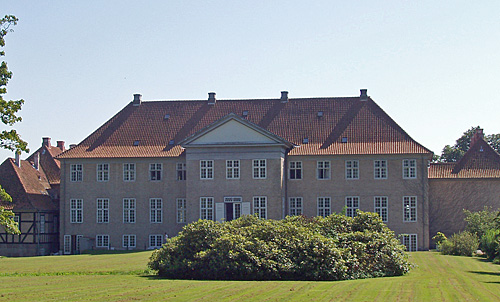
- Skjoldenæsholm south of town

- Location in Denmark Kirke Hvalsø (Denmark Region Zealand)
- Coordinates: 55°35′39″N 11°51′34″E
- Country: Denmark
- Region: Zealand (Sjælland)
- Municipality: Lejre Municipality

Area
  - Urban: 2.5 km^{2} (0.97 sq mi)

Population (2026)
  - Urban: 4,995
  - Urban density: 2,000/km^{2} (5,200/sq mi)
  - Gender: 2,394 males and 2,601 females
- Time zone: UTC+1 (CET)
  - Summer (DST): UTC+2 (CEST)
- Postal codes: 4330

Hvalsø is a town and a former municipality (Danish, kommune) in Region Sjælland on the island of Zealand (Sjælland) in east Denmark. The former municipality covered an area of 72 km^{2}, and had a total population of 7,856 (2005). Its last mayor was Virginia Holst, a member of the Venstre (Liberal Party) political party. She was the first foreign national becoming mayor in a Danish municipality.

== The town of Hvalsø ==
The town of Hvalsø (officially called Kirke Hvalsø) is located almost equidistant from the larger towns of Roskilde to the northeast, Ringsted to the south, and Holbæk to the northwest. On 1 January 2026 the town has a population of 4,995.

The large, state-owned and managed, wooded area, Bidstrup Woods (Bidstrup Skovene), is located south of the town, and offers many recreational possibilities. There is a system of hiking trails, some connecting to neighboring Skjoldenæsholm Forest District (Skjoldenæsholm Skovdistrikt).

Hvalsø is served by Hvalsø railway station on the Northwest Line and has regional train connections to Copenhagen, Roskilde, Holbæk and Kalundborg.

Hvalsø is the municipal seat of Lejre Municipality.

== Hvalsø municipality 1970-2006 ==
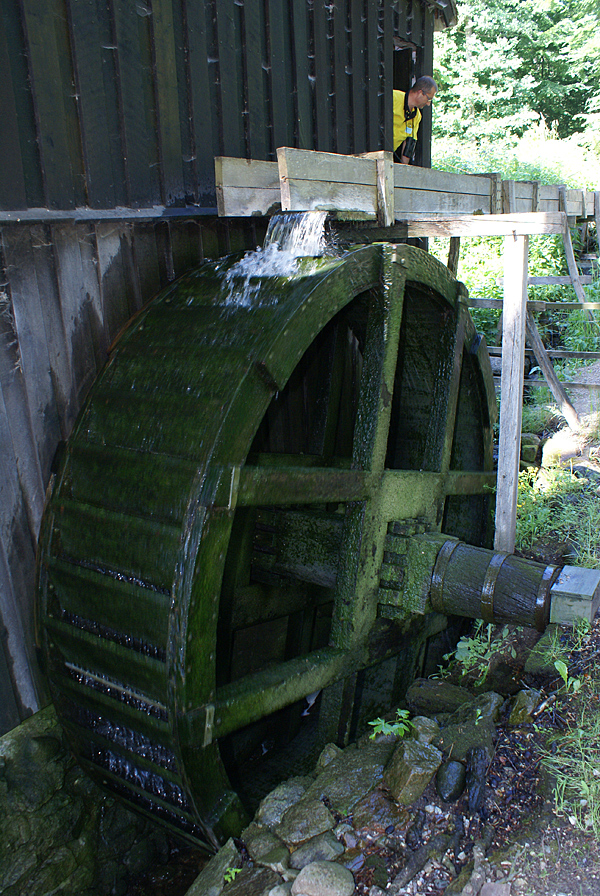
Tadre Mølle west of town

The municipality was created in 1970 as the result of a kommunalreform ("Municipality Reform") that combined a number of existing parishes:

- Hvalsø Parish
- Kisserup Parish
- Såby Parish
- Særløse Parish

On 1 January 2007 Hvalsø municipality ceased to exist as the result of Kommunalreformen ("The Municipality Reform" of 2007). It was merged with Bramsnæs and Lejre municipalities to form the new Lejre municipality. This created a municipality with an area of 240 km^{2} and a total population of 25,971 (2005).

== Notable people ==
- Christian E.O. Jensen (1859–1941) a pharmacists and botanist, a leading bryologist, he ran a pharmacy in Hvalsø
- Sara Blædel (born 1964), author, grew up in Hvalsø
- Cathrine Dufour (born 1992) a Danish Olympic dressage rider, competed at the 2016 Summer Olympics

== See also ==
- Skullerupholm
