= Sáhkku =

Sami board game

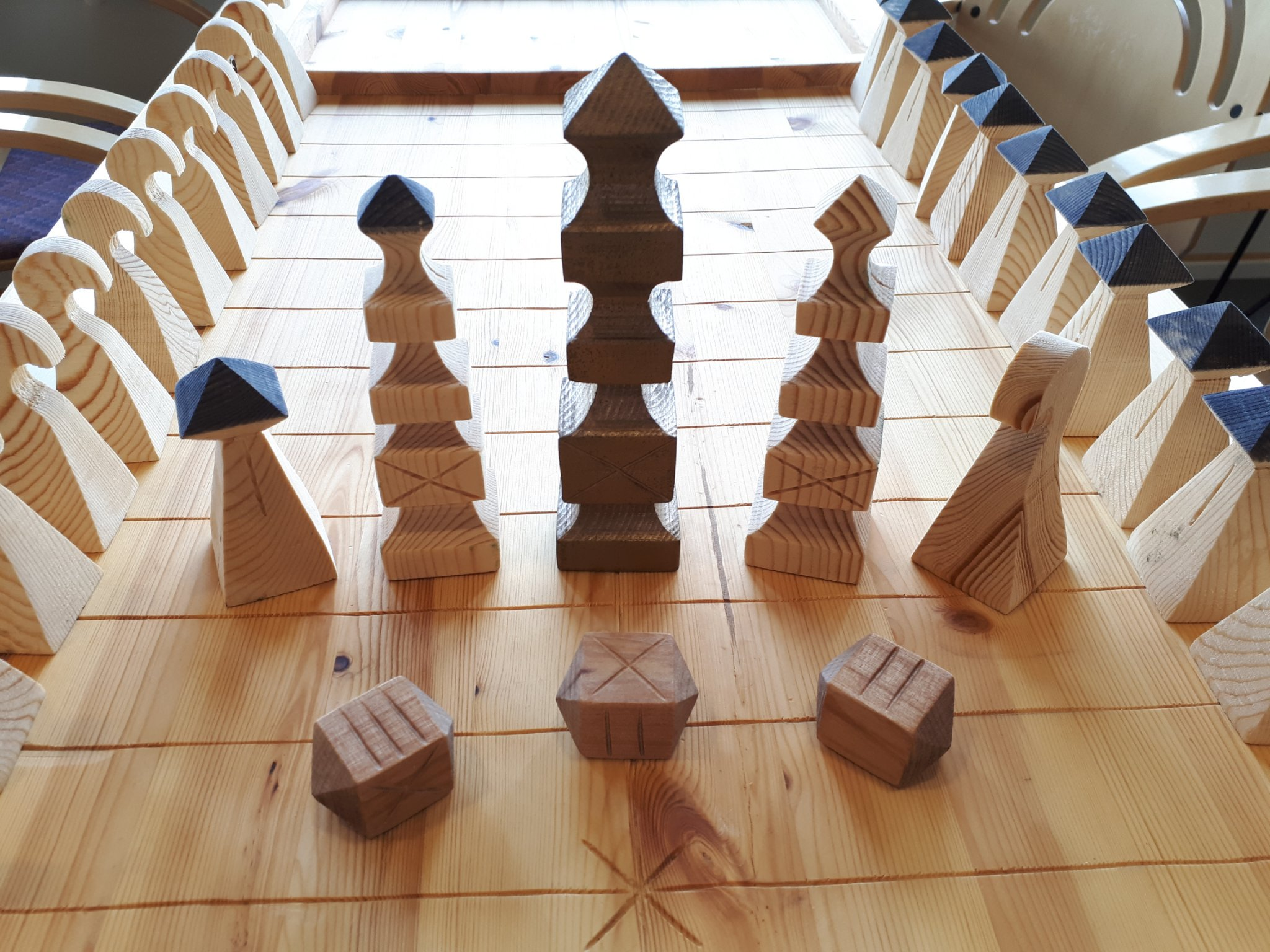
- Sáhkku set. Left to right: male soldier, queen of the men, king, queen of the women, female soldier. Front: sáhkku dice.
- Years active: First documented in the 1600s.
- Genres: Board game Running-fight game Dice game
- Players: 2
- Setup time: 30 seconds - 1 minute
- Playing time: 30–60 minutes
- Chance: Medium (dice rolling)
- Skills: Strategy, tactics, counting, probability
- Synonyms: "Bircu", "Percc", "The Devil's Game"

Sáhkku is a board game of the Sami people. The game is traditional among the North Sámi, Skolt Sámi, Inari Sámi and Lule Sámi but may also have been played in other parts of Sápmi.

== Rules ==
Sáhkku is a running-fight game, which means that players move their pieces along a track with the goal of eliminating the other players' pieces. Many different variants of sáhkku have been played in different parts of Sápmi. The oral transfer of the sáhkku rules between generations was largely broken off during the 1900s (see Sáhkku today). A few of the local variants have survived into our time, other local variants have been reconstructed based on a combination of memories and written sources, and for some places only fragments of the local rules are known from old documents.

=== Board ===
Bare Sáhkku board

Initial setup

One of the standard configurations for Sáhkku, 15×3 lines. Above, the bare board; below, the same board with pieces in their initial positions: 15 black, 15 white, and 1 king — unoccupied lines are indicated with dotted circles.

A sáhkku board (sáhkkufiellu, bircunfiellu or sáhkkulávdi) can traditionally be designed in a number of different ways. At its simplest, a sáhkku board has three parallel rows of short lines, and the pieces are placed on these lines. The lines are called sárgat (one sárggis) in Sámi.

It is common to draw the short lines as vertically connected to each other, so that the board appears to consist of just one row of very long lines, but the game is still played as if these were three separate rows of short lines. Such boards often also have three horizontal lines intersecting the vertical lines in order to illustrate that the lines are still in practice divided into three parallel rows. Some boards feature only a central horizontal line crossing the connected vertical lines, but the game is still played as if there were three rows of short lines.

A special type of sáhkku board is the so-called Návuotna board which has three rows of squares (ruvttat, lanjat) instead of lines.

The central line/square of the middle row, sometimes referred to as "the Castle", is indicated by a sáhkku-symbol ("X"), sun symbol, or other ornament.

=== Pieces ===
The game features several gálgut ("women") and olbmát ("men"), and one gonagas ("king"). The men and women are collectively referred to as “soldiers” in most variants. The most common number of soldiers on each side is fifteen, but the number has varied according to the length of the board. The smallest number of soldiers described as being used is eight (Boris Gleb), and the highest is twenty. The latter is described as being "used in the Finnmark fisheries”, without any further geographic specification.

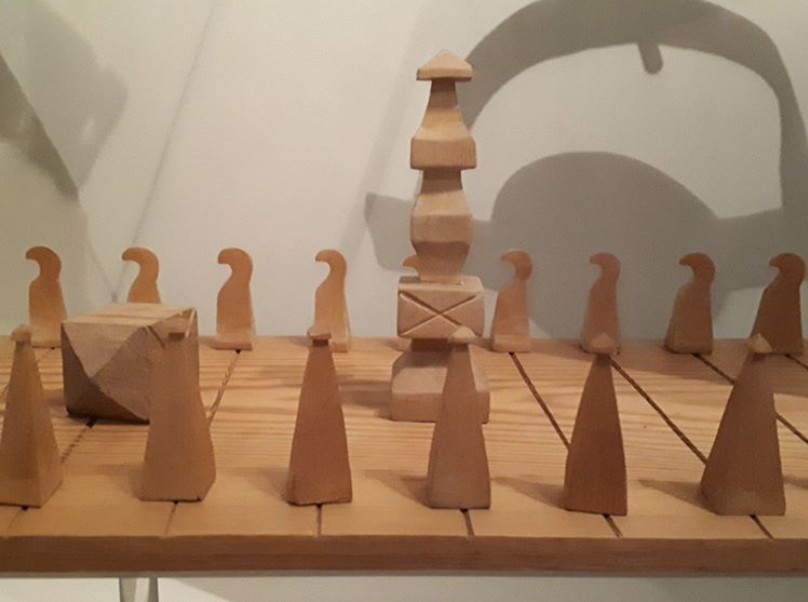
The "Isak Saba Set" from Unjárga, 1906

Sáhkku pieces produced in accordance with traditional Sámi boardgame duodji (handicraft) are not disc-shaped like pieces in Checkers and Backgammon, but "standing" pieces more akin to Chess pieces. In the simplest design type, each piece's top ends in a sharpened “pyramid” which for the women has a notch cut into it. It is also possible to "elaborate" on this notch so that the female pieces effectively have two "horns" that stick out to each their side. Another tradition is to cut the tops in the shapes of traditional Sámi hats from the area where the game is produced, for example cone-shaped tops for the men and hooked-shaped tops for the women, symbolizing the traditional North Sámi laddjogahpir hat which disappeared at the end of the 1800s because Christian missionaries and evangelists attacked the design for being a symbol of “the Devil’s horn”.

As for the shape of the king, this varies a lot between game sets. At its simplest, the king piece is a tall, slender "pyramid" with four sides. More often, ornaments are cut into the sides. Many of the king pieces are so elaborately carved that the pyramidal shape is only suggested.

=== Setup ===
At the beginning of the game, rows of men and women face each other on opposite rows of short lines (one sárggis, multiple sárgát). The Castle is occupied by the king. Dice are thrown to determine who begins the game. The player who first throws a sáhkku (X) may start.

=== Dice ===
A four-faced Sáhkku die, "unrolled" at right to show one of its several standard configurations.

The dice used for sáhkku are four-faced long dice or "stick dice". They are shaped like slightly elongated cubes whose short ends are sharpened to points so that they can only land on four of their sides. One side of each die bears the mark "X", the sáhkku symbol. The numbers on the other sides of the die have been known to vary. A common combination is X-II-III-0, but many other combinations have been known to exist. The number of dice used has also varied, three being a rather usual number. The dice are traditionally thrown in a bowl, rather than on the table.

=== Movement ===
Pieces are moved in accordance with values shown on the dice after a throw. Some rule sets demand that the player utilize die values in a certain order such as f.ex. X-III-II-0, while other rule sets do not mention any such rule. One may choose to move one piece several times during one's turn, or to use the values of the different dice to move several soldiers. In some variants, several pieces are allowed to occupy the same sárggis (short line), while in other rule sets this is unclear or explicitly forbidden.

=== The soldiers ===
When the game begins, the soldiers are inactive — that is, unable to move. A player can activate a soldier by throwing a sáhkku. When activated, a soldier is moved one sárggis ahead.

Local rules differ regarding whether activation is forced or free - i.e. if soldiers have to be activated in turn, starting with the player's foremost soldier, and continuing towards the back, or if any soldier in the home row may be activated regardless of its place in the row.

After activation, dice are used to determine how many sárgát soldiers can move ahead during their turn. The soldiers move in a set pattern or across the board. The shape of this "track" differs from variant to variant.

=== The king ===
Moving a sáhkku king to capture inactive soldiers (Friis 1871).

Rules for using the sáhkku king differ between local variants. In all variants the king begins neutral, not controlled by either player.

==== Recruiting the king ====
In nearly all variants, the king is recruited by a player who moves one of their pieces onto the sárggis currently occupied by the king. There are also some known historical variants where the king can be recruited in other ways.

==== Moving the king ====
Several different rules for how one may move the king exist. The following overview is not exhaustive.

- (A) The king moves like the soldiers of the player who currently controls it.
- (B) The king moves backwards or forwards.
- (C) The king can move orthogonally right, left, up, and down.

==== The fate of the king ====
What happens to the king during the course of the game is also subject to variation. In most variants of sáhkku, the loyalty of the king can change during the course of the game. The player not currently playing with the king may, for example, recruit it by moving a soldier onto the sárggis currently occupied by it. The king then becomes part of that player's army, until it is recruited by the opposing player again. In nearly all variants of the game, the king cannot itself be captured, only recruited.

=== Capturing soldiers ===
The object of the game is to capture all of the opponent's soldiers, that is, to remove them from the board. An opponent's soldier is captured when a player moves a soldier, or the recruited king, onto a sárggis occupied by the opponent. If the sárggis in question is occupied by several opposing soldiers (in the cases where such "cohabitation" is allowed), all those soldiers are captured. A captured soldier is removed from the board, and not entered again. In Sámi, the act of capturing a soldier is referred to as goddit - "to kill".

In some areas, the rules prohibited the capture of inactive soldiers, while in other areas the capture of inactive soldiers has been allowed, or the rules were unclearly written. It is unknown what was the most widespread, or original, rule.

=== Third piece types ===
Some variants of the game include other pieces in addition to the king and soldier pieces. In the only surviving variant that has such pieces - Lágesvuotna sáhkku - these are called "queens".

Researchers have earlier called such "third pieces" in sáhkku game sets "king's children", theorizing that the pieces were imported from another Sámi board game, dablo, which has such pieces. The queens in Lágesvuona sáhkku, do however have an entirely different function than the dablo king's children.

== Variants ==
=== Lágesvuotna sáhkku ===
The path of the soldiers in Lágesvuotna sáhkku. The board shown here is designed so that the three parallel rows of short lines (sárgát) are drawn as connected vertically, and intersected by a central, horizontal line. This is a purely aesthetic choice which does not affect gameplay.

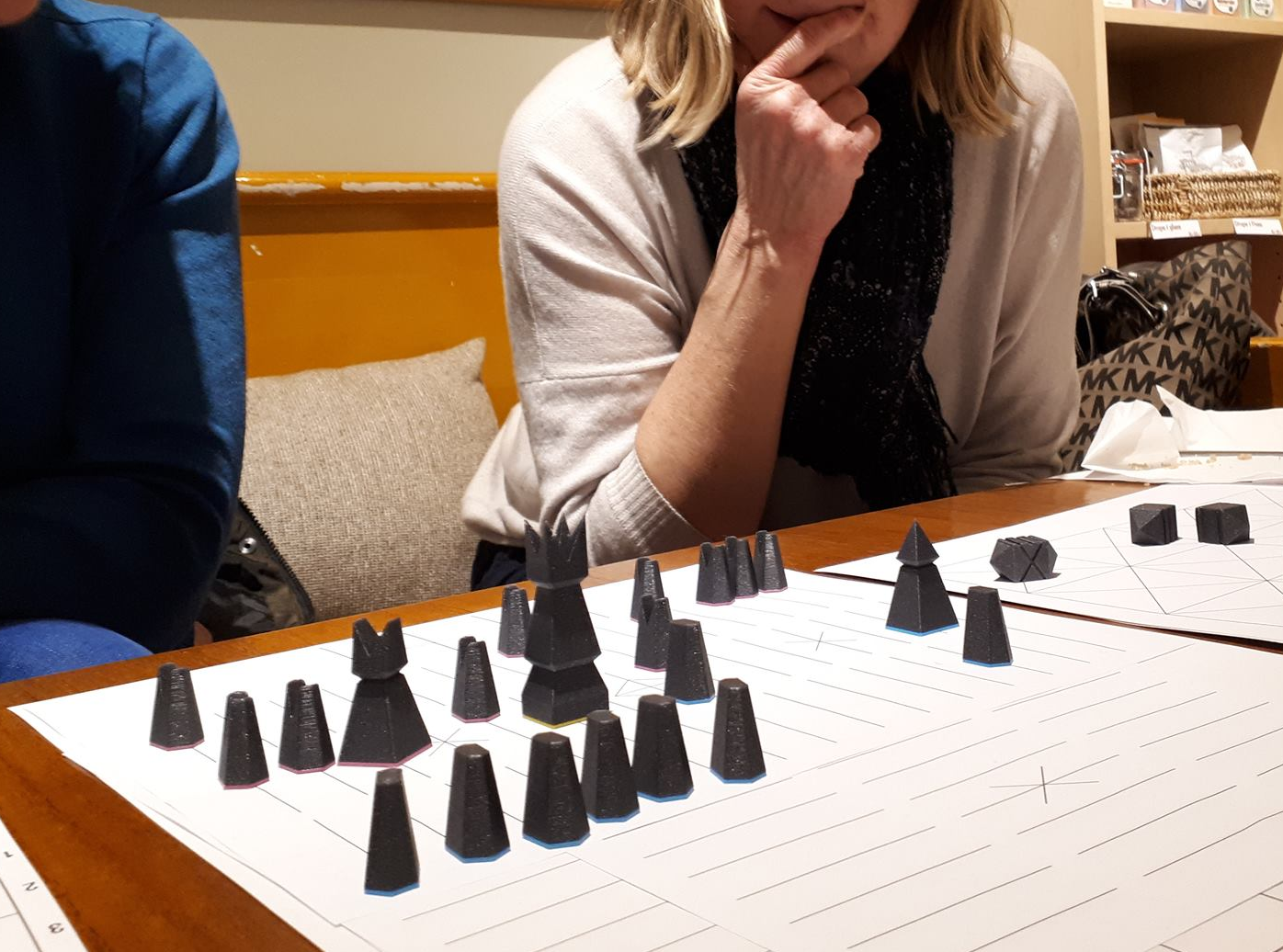
A game of Lágesvuon' sáhkku in play. Áltá, 2018.

Lágesvuotna sáhkku is a reconstruction of the type of sáhkku played in the Lágesvuotna area. The reconstruction was made by local elder Edmund Johansen.

==== Design ====
The game uses a standard sáhkku board, i.e. an elongated board upon which is drawn three rows of fifteen sárgát (short, vertical lines - singular sárggis), on which the pieces may stand. The middle sárggis on the middle row is "the Castle" (Šloahtta), marked by a sun symbol or other symbol. On each side of the Castle, five sárgát away, are two sárgát marked by an X (sáhkku symbol) or other symbol.

==== Board and setup ====
There are 3×15 sárgát. As the game begins, 15 soldiers are placed on the 15 sárgát that constitute their player's "home row". The soldiers are called "men" and "women" (olbmát and gálgut). Each side's army is led by a queen (dronnet), which the players place on the rightmost X-marked sárggis on the middle row. The king (gonagas), which begins neutral, is placed in the Castle.

==== Dice ====
There are three dice, inscribed with X-III-II-blank. X signifies "move an activated piece 1 sárggis", "activate a piece", or "rethrow die". The latter means that when a player throws X, they are allowed to rethrow the X-giving die in the hope of getting another value, and may rethrow again until the die lands on another value than X.

It is not optional which die value is used first. One must first use the dice showing X, then use the ones showing III, and following this use the ones showing II. If you have a III that you can't use to perform a legal move, and a II that you could have performed a legal move with, then you can't use the II.

==== The soldiers' movement ====
Soldiers must be activated in order - rightmost soldier first. Unactivated soldiers can't be moved and can't be captured. It is never allowed to move a piece onto a sárggis occupied by an unactivated soldier.

The soldiers' "track" is that they move to the right on their home row, to the left on the middle row, and to the right on the enemy row.

If a soldier should survive the enemy row, it moves onto the middle row and walks towards the left again. When it reaches the middle row's end for the second time, it must move down instead of up. It goes back into the home row and repeats the movement pattern.

If you lose all your soldiers, you have lost the game.

==== The king's movement ====
The king moves similarly to what is described under (C). It may move orthogonally up and down, by using exact die values: from the home row it needs II to cross directly over to the enemy row, and X to cross directly over to the middle row, while from the middle row it needs X to cross over to the home row or enemy row. Also, the king may move both forwards and backwards within the "8"-shaped movement pattern of the soldiers.

==== Recruiting the king ====
When the game begins, the king is neutral. When you move a soldier or queen of yours onto a sárggis occupied by the king, you recruit it. From now on, you may use it as your own piece. The king may never be captured, but can be recruited back by your opponent at any time.

==== The queen's movement ====
The queen moves just like the king. When the game begins, the queen is unactivated. This means that she can't be moved and can't be captured, and no piece may be placed on the sárggis where she stands. She may be activated by using a sáhkku (X). Her activation move may be up, down, left, or right - dependent on what moves are legal for her in the concrete situation. Unlike the king, the queen can be captured just like an ordinary soldier. If you lose your queen, you have lost the game.

==== Cohabitation ====
There may be several active soldiers on one sárggis, but all of them are captured if an enemy piece is moved onto the sárggis where they stand.

A royal piece may not share a sárggis with any other piece. The only exception to this rule is that you can move your soldier or queen onto a sárggis occupied by the enemy-controlled king, upon which you recruit the king. In no other circumstance is it legal to move another piece onto a sárggis occupied by a royal piece, or to move a royal piece onto a sárggis currently occupied by a piece that is part of its own army.

The rule stating that a royal piece cannot share a sárggis with another piece in its own army, and the above-mentioned rule stating that a sárggis where an unactivated piece stands may not be entered by any active piece, have the effect that royal pieces are not very mobile in the beginning of a sáhkku game, but as pieces are activated or captured, the royal pieces become increasingly free to move around on the board.

=== Vuovdaguoika or Gávkevuotna sáhkku ===
This version of sáhkku is traditional both to the Vuovdaguoika area in Ohcejohka on the Finnish side of Sápmi, and by the fiord Gávkevuotna near North Cape on the Norwegian side of Sápmi. It is likely that it was played in several other locations between these two villages. Unlike Lágesvuotna sáhkku, which is a reconstructed game, and Návuotna sáhkku, the rules of which were written down before the game went out of play for some decades - this variant of sáhkku has been transferred between the generations in an unbroken line until today. The rules were also documented during the 1970s by the Sámi author Oahpt'ii Hánsa (Hans A. Guttorm) who had learnt the game from his father.

==== Design ====
The design of the game set is fundamentally similar to that of Lágesvuotna sáhkku.

==== Board and setup ====
There are 3×15 sárgát. As the game begins, 15 soldiers are placed on the 15 sárgát that constitute their player's "home row". The soldiers can be called "men and women", and may also be referred to collectively as the players' soahteveagat (armies). There is no queen in play in this variant. The king (gonagas), which begins neutral, is placed in the Castle.

==== Dice ====
There are three dice, inscribed with X-III-II-blank.

X (sáhkku or ruossa) signifies "move an activated piece 1 sárggis" or "activate a piece". Dice may only be rethrown if a player gets 3*X.

Blank signifies "move four" instead of "no move".

You may use the dice in any order you like.

==== The soldiers' movement ====
Soldiers must be activated in order - frontmost soldier first.

Unlike in Lágesvuotna sáhkku, unactivated soldiers may very well be captured.

It is not allowed to move a piece onto a sárggis occupied by a soldier in your own army.

Furthermore, a soldier may not jump (move past) a soldier of its own army. Players may agree to not use this rule, before initiating a game.

The moving pattern of the soldiers is different from that of Lágesvuotna sáhkku. Soldiers move towards the right in their home row, left on the middle row, and towards the right in the enemy row - but upon returning from the enemy's home row and having for the second time traversed the middle row, the soldiers head back up into the enemy's home row again, and never return to their own home row.

This moving pattern is called vuosttut. The game can also be played mieđut. In the latter case, one player follows the pattern described above but the other player moves in the opposite direction: left in the home row, right in the middle row, left in the enemy row. This leads the players' soldiers to "chase" one another across the middle row and enter each other's home rows "from behind".

==== The king's movement ====
The king moves as described in the rules under (A) - as an ordinary soldier. The main exception is that, unlike a normal soldier, it may pass (jump) soldiers of its own army. Also, it has a special "ramming" feature that will be explained below.

==== Recruiting the king ====
When the game begins, the king is neutral. When you move a soldier onto a point occupied by the king, you recruit it. From now on, you may use it as your own piece. The king may never be captured, but can be recruited back by your opponent at any time.

When moving a soldier onto the spot occupied by the king - no matter who it currently belongs to - the soldier "pushes" (cadjat) the king one sárggis ahead. If an enemy soldier is on this sárggis, the king "rams" it and it is captured.

=== Navuotna sáhkku ===
The Návuotna type of sáhkku board replaces the relatively standard layout of 3×15 sárgát with 3×13 squares.All Návuotna style sáhkku games are played with the soldier path demonstrated on this diagram. Ráisa sáhkku and Máze sáhkku is played on a Návuotna board.

This version of sáhkku is traditional to the Návuotna fiord in North Troms. It exists in two sub-variants, one known as Ráisa sáhkku and the other as Máze sáhkku. The rules were written down in the 1950s by the researcher Yngvar Mejland from Ráisa. During the 1980s, a local variant was developed in the Inner Finnmark village Máze.

==== Design ====
The Návuotna sáhkku board is designed with squares, as in chess, instead of sárgát. The king is often topped with a bishop's crook.

==== Board and setup ====
There are 3×13 squares, with twelve soldiers on each of the sides' home rows. In the starting position, the rightmost square (from the player's perspective) is left open.

In the Máze variant, the soldiers are referred to as áhkut (grandmothers) and ádját (grandfathers), and when inactive they are placed "face down" (lying) on their places. They are then said to be "sleeping" (oađđit) and activating them is referred to as "waking" them (boktet).

==== Dice ====
Návuotna sáhkku calls for two dice, instead of three. The dice show X-I-II-III. X signifies "move an activated piece 1 square", "activate a piece", or "rethrow die". The latter means that when a player throws X, they are allowed to rethrow the X-giving die in the hope of getting another value, and may rethrow again until the die lands on another value than X.

In the Ráisa variant it is not optional which dice value is used first. One must first use the dices showing X, then use the ones showing I, following this use the ones showing II, and only then use the ones showing III.

In the Máze variant, the order in which one uses the dice is entirely optional. In terms of concrete rules, this is the only difference between the Máze and Ráisa variants of Návuotna sáhkku.

==== Soldiers' movement ====
Soldiers may be activated in whichever order the player desires. Unactivated soldiers may not move but may be captured. In the Máze variant, the capture of inactive pieces is referred to as "killing in the bedchambers" (goddit oađđenlanjain).

Soldiers move towards the right in their home row, towards the left on the middle row, and towards the right in the enemy row.

Upon returning from the enemy's home row and having for the second time traversed the middle row, the soldiers head back up into the enemy's home row again, never returning to their own home row.

==== King's movement ====
The king moves as described in the rules under (A) – as an ordinary soldier. If a player is left with only the king, they have lost the game. The king is hence a weaker piece than the ordinary soldiers, as the possession of a soldier prevents a player from losing but possession of the king does not.

==== Recruiting the king ====
When the game begins, the king is neutral. When you move a soldier onto a point occupied by the king, you recruit it. From now on, you may use it as your own piece. The king may never be captured, but can be recruited back by your opponent at any time.

== History ==
=== Name ===
The North Sámi word "sáhkku", which is the name of both the game and the throw "X", means "fine", as in "mulct" or "penalty". Researchers have recorded that in one Lule Sámi area (Huhttán) the verb for playing sáhkku was "sakkotet". This is akin to sáhkkudit in modern Lule Sámi spelling, which means "to fine". On the other hand, the North Sámi verb for playing sáhkku is sáhkostallat, which has no other meaning.

The reasoning behind this name has been subject to some speculation and debate. One theory, put forth by Edmund Johansen, a veteran player of the game, to the French researcher Alan Borvo, is that "fine" in this case is a euphemism for "offering", used to avoid the wrath of Christian priests and evangelists. Sáhkku was considered a sinful game by such people, who saw traces of Sámi pre-Christian worship in it, and called it "The Devil's Game". According to Johansen's theory, it was in fact correct that the "King" piece had earlier been seen by players as representing a non-Christian deity in the game, and that the men's and women's "recruiting" of it implicitly happens through offerings.

...this king may perfectly well have meant god with the signification the Sámit give to that word, i.e. a natural power, neither good nor bad, with whom one has to deal anyway by making offerings. In our language sáhkku means ‘penalty’. You may know the Sámit often give things new names just to avoid the minister’s wrath, so they could say penalty while they really thought of offering.”

In support of this theory, Borvo has noted similarities between some wood-constructed Sámi sieidis (objects that are sacrificed to) and the shapes given to certain sáhkku king pieces.

The game was also referred to as to play birccut, which simply means to play "dice" in North Sámi. An alternative name for the game in Skolt Sámi, percc, means the same.

The word Sáhkku is not related to the vaguely similar names of chess that derive from Old Persian (such as the German Schach, from which the Finnish shakki and the Hungarian sakk were borrowed).

=== Related games ===
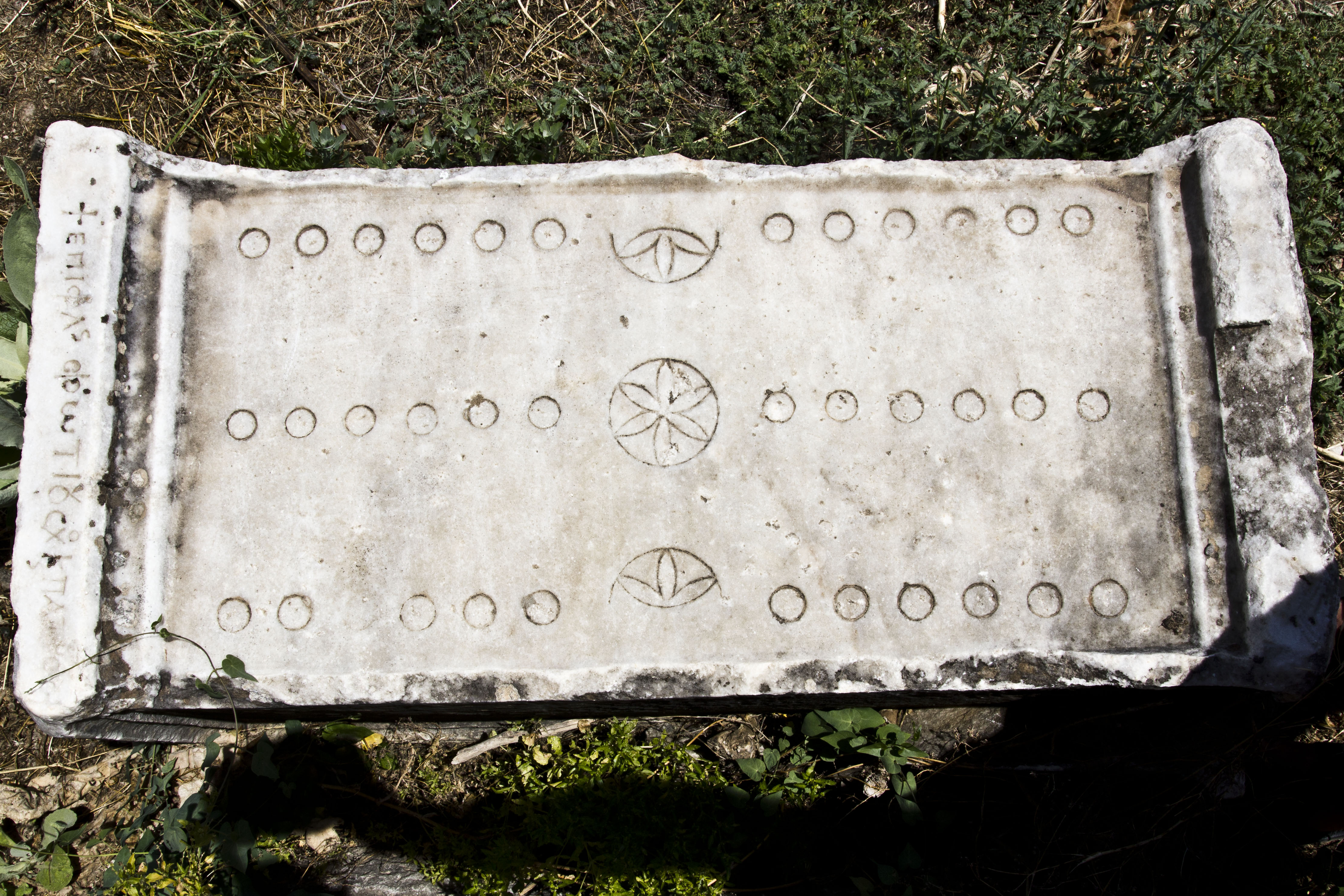
XII Scripta, a possible ancestor of sáhkku

Sáhkku is part of a family of running-fight games that has its oldest traceable roots in the Eastern Mediterranean, and has been played at least since the 1300s. Members of this family bear obvious similarities to the Roman game tabula (the ancestor of backgammon), and the playing boards often have similarities to the board of tabula's probable ancestor, the Roman game XII scripta. There has been much scholarly debate, but no conclusive answers, as to how the games has spread from the Mediterranean to Northern Europe.

==== African and Asian relatives ====
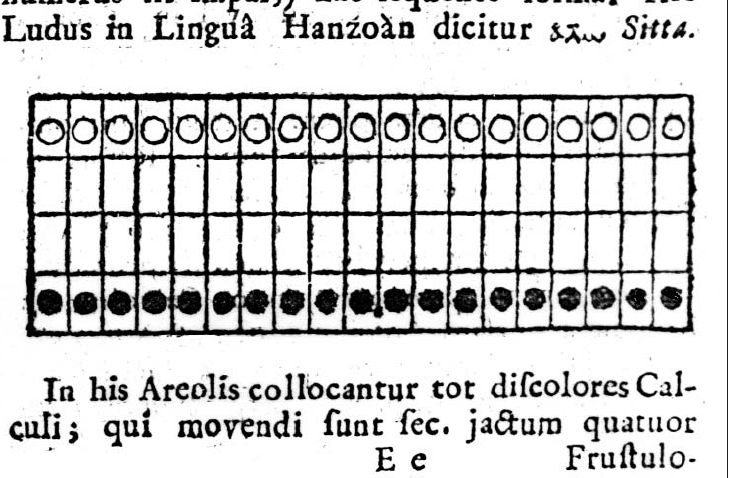
Tâb board from Thomas Hyde's book Mandragorias seu Historia shahiludii (1694)

Tâb (also known as ‘’deleb’’ or ‘’sîg’’) is a game played in northern Africa and south-western Asia. A very similar game, tablan, is traditional to India. When compared to sáhkku, tâb has somewhat different rules for moving pieces, and uses sticks in place of dice. The board is often larger, using four rows instead of three, although variants played with three rows also occur in Northern Africa. Pieces can be stacked and moved together, on the risk that all but one of them are lost if the stack is placed on a point where one of the pieces have been before. There is no king or kings’ children present in the game – that feature is exclusive to sáhkku.

The first description of a game which is certain to be tâb occurred in 1694, that is some decades after Schefferus' book Lapponia described the use of sáhkku dice in Sápmi (see below). However, a game assumed to be a predecessor of tâb was mentioned in a poem already in 1310. The researcher Thierry Depaulis argues that the game was played “by the 10th century at least”.

==== European relatives ====
The game daldøs, played in parts of Denmark and southern Norway, is an obvious relative of sáhkku and tâb. Daldøs uses dice that are more or less identical to the sáhkku dice. Its rules are more similar to Ráisá sáhkku than to how sáhkku is generally played, but still different enough to be described as a fundamentally other game than Ráisá sáhkku. In place of moving pieces on short lines or squares on a board, daldøs applies pegs that are moved from hole to hole on a board. Several pegs are not allowed to occupy the same hole (something that they obviously cannot, physically, do), and pegs belonging to the same player cannot pass one another. Furthermore, the pegs move in the same direction, as one player enters the middle row from the left, whereas the other enters the middle row from the right. The middle row is also one hole longer than the home rows, a similarity shared with a version of tâb played in Algeria. Finally, daldøs features neither a king, nor queens or for that matter "king's children".

Daldøs is first mentioned in passing in a Danish work of fiction from 1876, the plot of which was set to the 1600s. The rules were not explained by the author, but an interested reader tracked down a person who knew the rules during the 1920s. The oldest surviving game set is no older than the early 1800s.

In addition to sáhkku and daldøs, one other traditional running-fight board game survives in Northern Europe: the Icelandic game ad elta stelpur. This game differs from both of the other two by, among other things, featuring only two rows. The pieces move in the same direction, chasing each other around the board.

=== The ancestor issue ===
It is generally assumed that tâb, daldøs and sáhkku have not developed separately, but are related to one another, and that the game has its origin in the Middle East. Several theories have been put forth as to how the tâb tradition travelled from such southern latitudes to the northernmost reaches of Sápmi. Borvo referred to three opportunities as the ‘’Pomor track’’, the ‘’Kven track’’, and the ‘’Viking track’’, while Depaulis argued for a ‘’Varangian track’’, and added a hypothetical ‘’Vandal track’’.

==== Eastern tracks ====
The ‘’Varangian track’’ favored by Depaulis posits that Vikings who travelled in Eastern and Southeastern Europe between the 800s and 1000s may have learnt a game of the tâb family in Byzantium, brought it home, and that daldøs and sáhkku developed out of this. Depaulis notes that objections to this theory include that there is no evidence that the tâb type of games existed in the Middle East at such an early point in history, and that the east-faring Vikings were mainly from contemporary Sweden, whereas daldøs and sáhkku are generally known to have been played only within the contemporary borders of Norway and Denmark - the confirmed exceptions to the latter being localities in Finland and Russia that were immediate neighbors to the Coast Sámi of Norway.

The ‘’Pomor track’’ posits that a tâb-type game was introduced to the Sámi by Russian merchants through the Pomor trade (ca. 1740-1917). The ‘’Kven track’’ suggests that the Kvens, immigrants from Finland who arrived in the 1700s and 1800s, brought the game with them. Sáhkku was generally played on the North Coast of Sápmi, the areas where the Sámi were most involved in the Pomor trade, and which were targeted by Kven immigration. Borvo notes that the absence of any traditional tâb-type game in Russia, except the sáhkku of the Russian Sámi, speaks against the Pomor track, and that the same applies for the Kven track since the Finns have no tâb-type games of their own. Depaulis additionally doubts the Kven and Pomor tracks because he finds it hard to imagine that the Norwegians and Danes based their daldøs game on the Sámi sáhkku game, but he does not give any arguments as to why this is any less likely than the opposite; nor does he address the possibility that daldøs and sáhkku could have developed separately, but with roots in the same Middle Eastern progenitor.

==== Western tracks ====
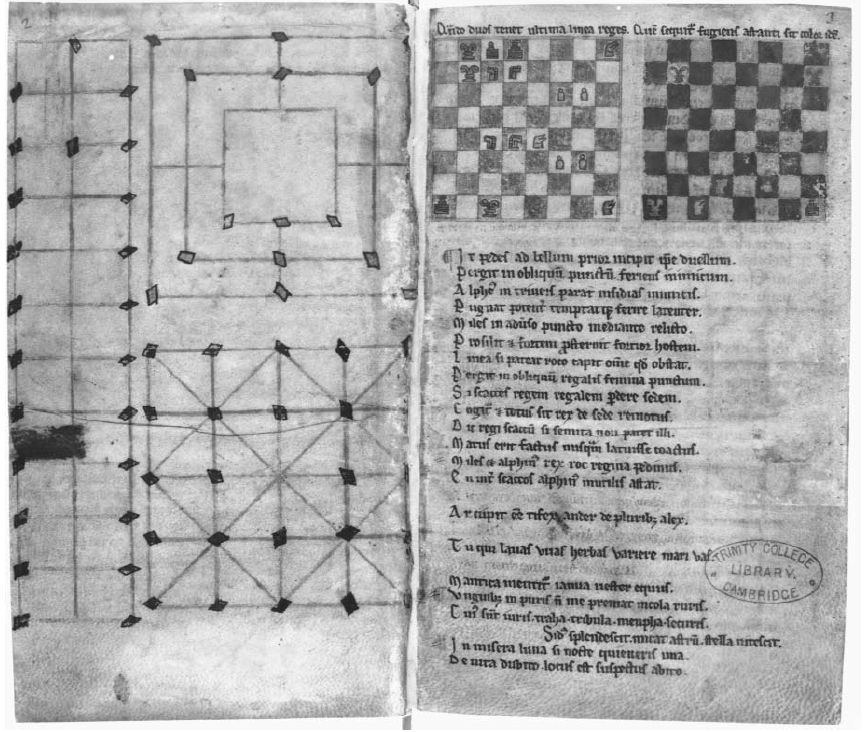
Gameboards, manuscript from Cerne Abbey, Dorset (1250-1300). Possible sáhkku relative to the left.

The ‘’Viking track’’ preferred by Borvo posits that west-faring Norse seafarers learnt the game in the south, adapted it to daldøs, and introduced the game to the Sámi, who again made sáhkku from that basis. If this is to have happened in the Viking Age, táb-type games must be older than what written sources indicate. Depaulis adds to Borvo’s ‘’Viking track’’ theory by pointing to relationships between the Western Vikings (of contemporary Denmark and Norway) and Islamic Spain during the 800s, although this again presupposes that tâb is older than what written sources indicate. Borvo notes that the absence of sáhkku and daldøs traditions on the long stretch of coastline between Jæren in the south and Ivguvuotna in the north does not speak in favor of this theory, or indeed any theory presupposing that tâb-type games were at one point played along the entire western coast of Scandinavia. He speculates that the game may have died out south of Ivgovuotna because it was only in the far north that the Coast Sámi made certain innovations to the game that made it interesting enough to keep playing for centuries (i.e. the king and king’s children, the increased freedom of pieces to move). This explanation presses the question of why the less “exciting” version, daldøs, did survive in southern Scandinavia.

The general idea that the game spread from Africa and Asia along the west coast of Europe, gets some support from the findings of what is assumed to be related game boards stemming from seafaring communities around southern England: What appears to be a board for a game in the same family was found in the wreckage of the English warship Mary Rose, which sank south of England in 1545. Likewise, a 13th-century manuscript from Dorset includes a drawing of a game board which is seen as having probably been used to play a game of this family. This last finding predates the first mention a game called "tâb", and both findings predate the first description of tâb. Like daldøs, both the Mary Rose game board and the Dorset board feature an “extra” point on the middle row.

==== The Northern track ====
Finally, Depaulis points to a speculative opposite direction of this game family's spread – the ‘’Vandal track’’, in which a three-rowed running-fight game was brought from the North to Northern Africa by Vandals in the period 400-500 CE, and spread from there to the Middle East. This would imply that tâb developed from a North European game tradition, and not the other way around. It also implies that sáhkku and its northern relatives may be direct descendants of the original North European running-fight game.

==== The lack of sources and artifacts ====
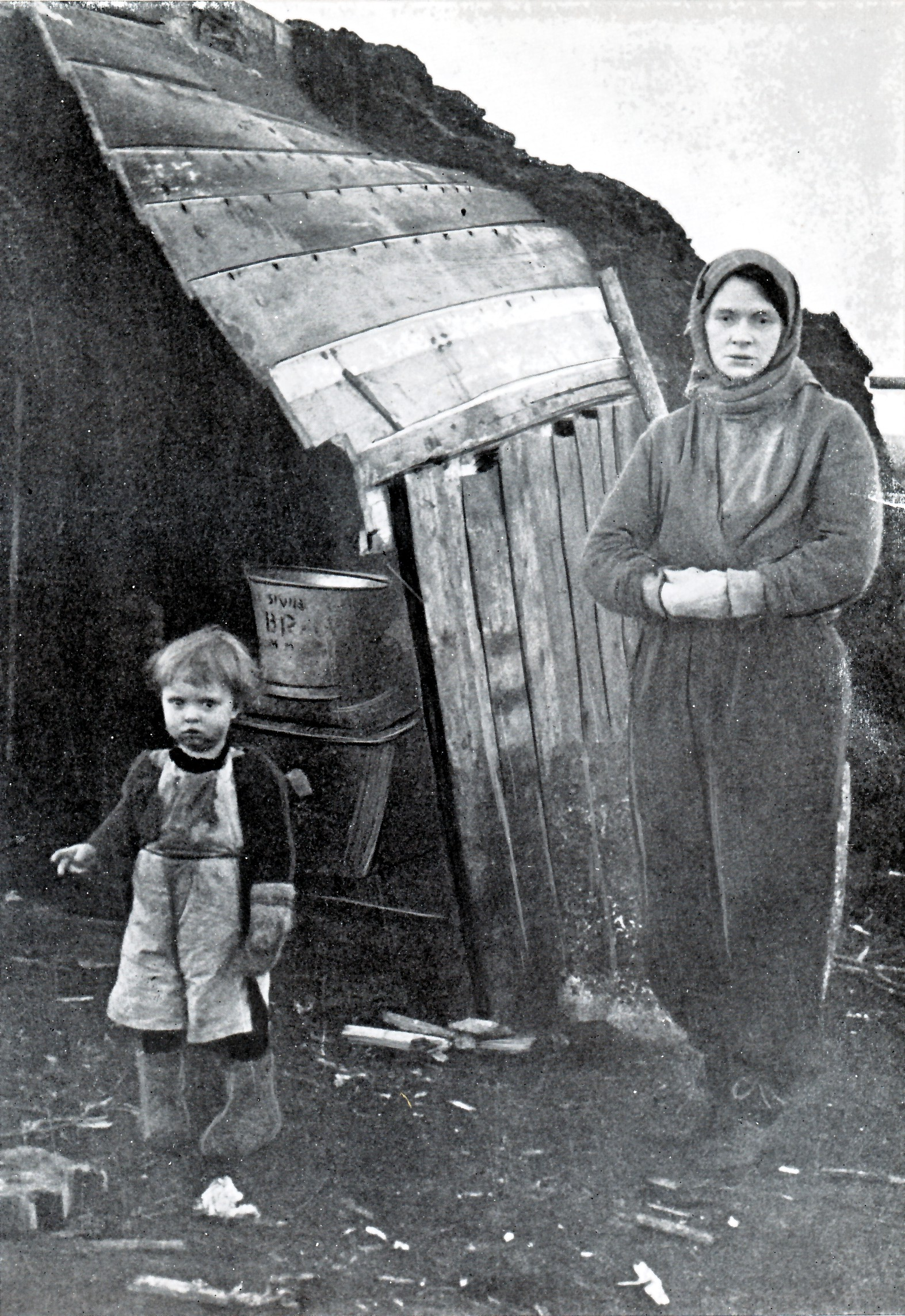
Mother and child with the few possessions they had left after Nazi Germany torched Finnmark (1944)

All of these theories have in common that there is little to no textual or material evidence to back any of them up. In addition to the sparse written sources, a key difficulty is that the tâb types of game were generally made from “ephemeral” materials which do not leave long-lasting material remains: often wood in the North, and in the Middle East the game has often simply been drawn in the sand, using twigs and stones for pieces and dice.

As regards sáhkku, this lack of material artifacts problem was made worse by Nazi Germany's burning of Finnmark and North Troms in 1944–45. Operation Nordlicht targeted the region with scorched earth tactics, and destroyed the pre-World War II material culture of the Coast Sámi almost in its entirety. The Wehrmacht had done the same in Finnish Lapland before initiating the destruction of Finnmark and North Troms. Since this calamity struck precisely the region where sáhkku had mainly been played, it is unlikely that any game sets older than 1944 survived, except those that were stored in museums outside of the region.

=== The development and spread of sáhkku ===
==== First mentions of the game ====
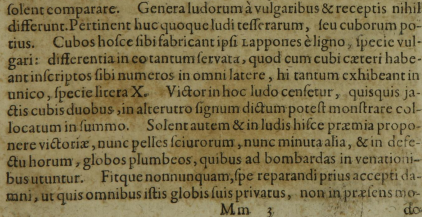
"Dice games belong here too, or rather cubes. The Lapps make these cubes out of wood. They are of an ordinary type. They have numbers inscribed on every side, or the letter X." Lapponia (1673), p. 277–278.

It is unknown how long sáhkku has been played among the Sámi. The earliest mention in writing of what could be sáhkku was made by Johannes Schefferus in his book Lapponia (1673), where he states that the Sámi use dice that he describes as having the shape and markings of contemporary sáhkku dice. He credits Olaus Sirma with giving him this information. Schefferus did not, however, describe any game similar to sáhkku. After this, it is not until 1841 when a written source speaks of a game called sáhkku being played, then in the Lule Sámi area. This is generally assumed to have been the same game as the one described here, although no further description of that game was given. The first unambiguous description of sáhkku was made by J. A. Friis in 1871, who accounted in detail for a version played in Finnmark (see drawing below).

==== Introduction of the king and other types of new pieces ====
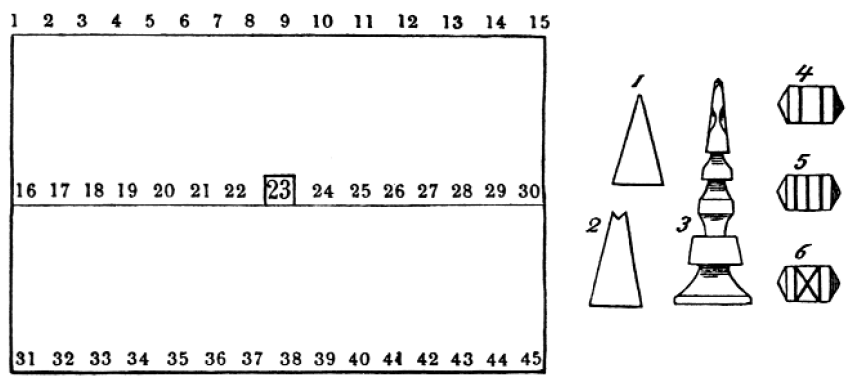
Diagram of sáhkku board and pieces by J. A. Friis (1871)

Friis’ description shows that the king piece unique to this tâb-type game had by then been invented, but he makes no mention of queens or for that matter "king’s children". However, the oldest existing sáhkku board (1876) features markings that indicate the place where the queens are set in Lágesvuotna sáhkku, although the set does not include the actual pieces.

The oldest existing complete sáhkku set, donated to a museum by Isak Saba in 1906 (depicted at the top of this article), includes soldiers, the king, three dice and a board with markings for where to place the king and possibly queens. There also exist non-complete sets of pieces – soldiers, king, and third piece types – which date back to the 1800s.

Michaelsen and Borvo argue that the introduction of the king into this relative of tâb could have been inspired by the Sámi board game tablut, which features a king piece shaped in a similar way to certain sáhkku king pieces.

Likewise, Michaelsen speculates that in some variants the third pieces may have been not queens but king's children inspired by the Sámi board game dablo which has such pieces. Tablut was documented in the 1700s, while dablo was mainly documented in the 1800s and early 1900s. Both of these are, like sáhkku, specifically Sámi board games that belong to a larger family of games – tablut is of the North European tafl family, while dablo is of the alquerque family that has its earliest traceable roots in the Middle East, and came to Europe through Spain.

==== Geographical distribution of the game ====
While descriptions of tablut and dablo are generally from the South Sámi area, more precisely Jämtland and southern Swedish Lapland, sáhkku has to our knowledge generally been played on the coast and the eastern inland of the North Sámi and Skolt Sámi area, in a region ranging from Ivguvuotna to Peäccam. According to Anders Larsen the game was also played by coastal Sámi further south, in Nordland county. Hence, sáhkku has at least during the last two centuries mainly been played in the core area of the Coast Sámi culture. The game is, however, also known to have been played in northern parts of Finnish Lapland, more precisely Ohcejohka and Aanar, and among the Skolt Sámi of contemporary Norway, Finland and Russia. See also the above mention of a game called sáhkku being played among the Lule Sámi of Huhttán, Swedish Lapland.

Outside of Sápmi, what is speculated to be a sáhkku king has been found in Spitzbergen (1890), although this piece could also be a chess king. It has, however, been documented by V. Carlheim-Gyllensköld (cited by researcher Peter Michaelsen) that Russians in Spitzbergen did indeed play sáhkku in the 1890s. This variant employed 2*13 soldiers and one king, on a board with 3*13 lines. Uniquely, they also used six-sided dice. One of the sides was marked “X”, one was blank, and the remaining sides marked with strokes (I-II-III-IIII). The “X” was referred to by the Russians as sakko, a name confirming that these Russians had indeed learnt the game from the Sámi, or alternately that they themselves were Russian Sámi.

== Sáhkku today ==
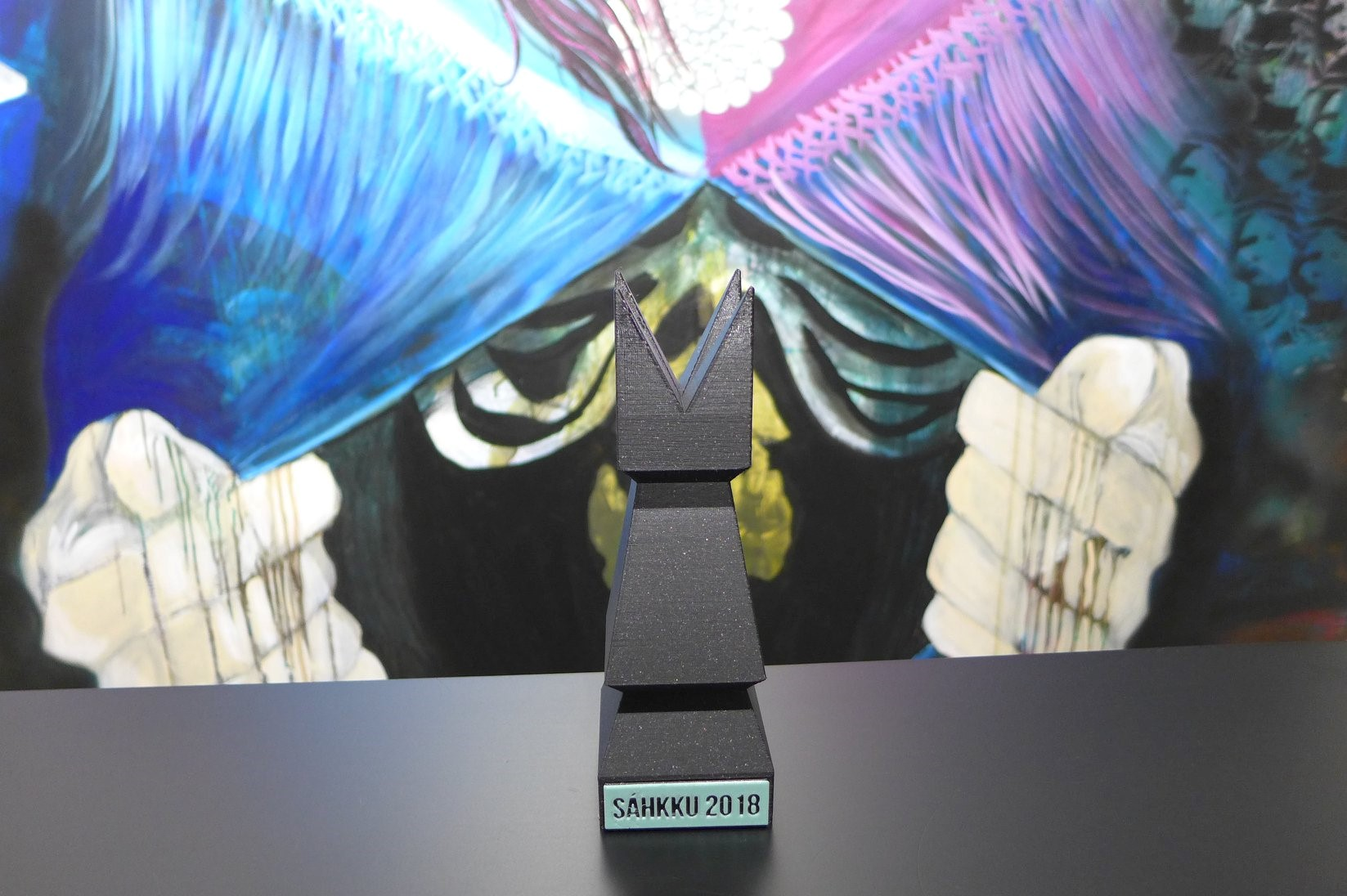
Trophy of the 2018 Oslo Sáhkku Cup

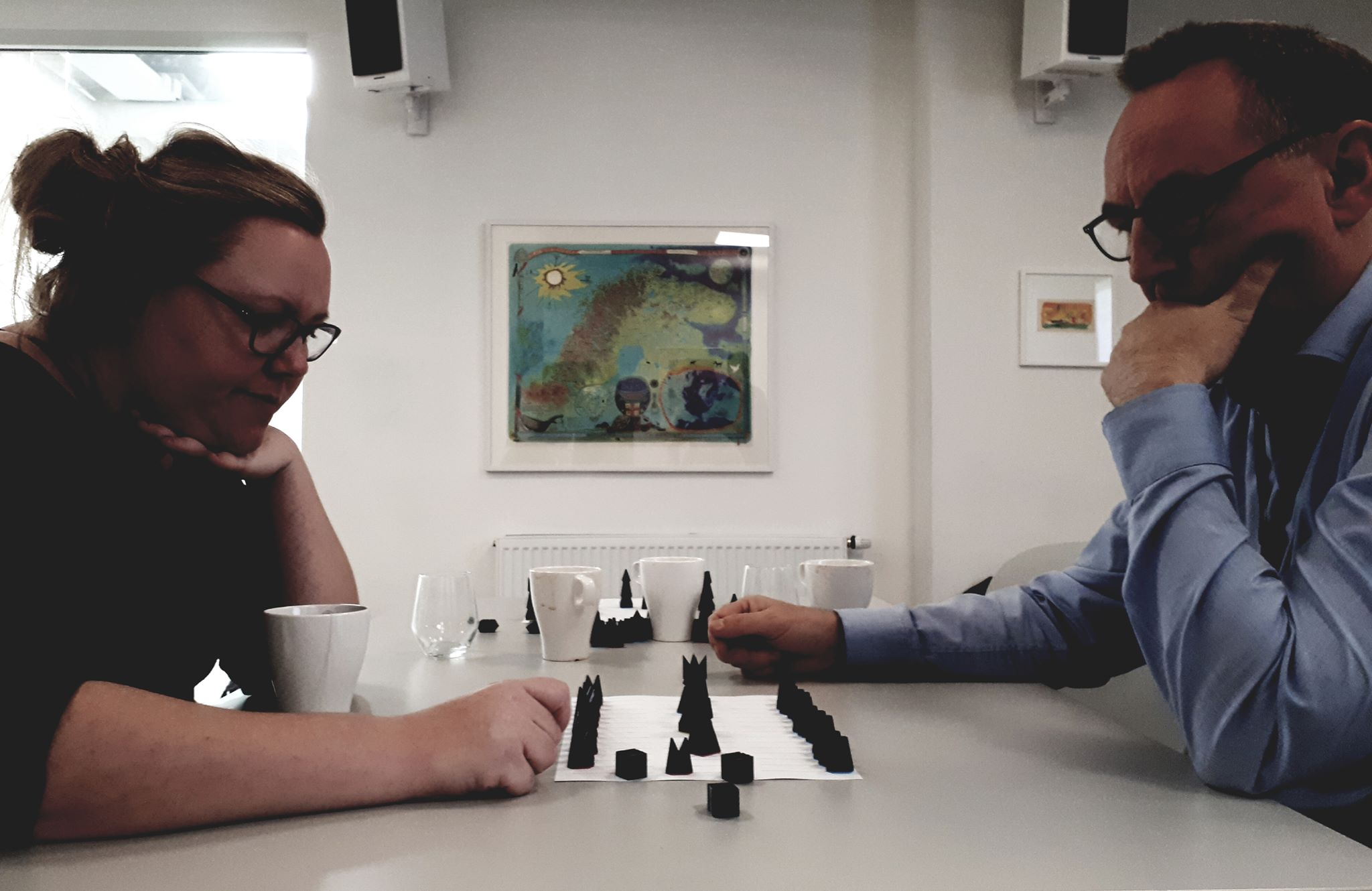
Semi finale players at the first open sáhkku cup, Oslo 2018

Sáhkku was considered a sinful game by Christian missionaries and Laestadian evangelists. As a result of this religious pressure - in addition to official Norwegianization policy's pressure to abandon all aspects of Sámi culture and identity, and the destruction of Coast Sámi material culture during World War II - sáhkku began to fall out of use in Sámi communities after the 1950s. In some localities the game was still played regularly during the 1960s (often in secrecy to avoid negative reactions from those with religious objections to it) but it eventually fell out of widespread usage.

Sámi cultural revitalization began to pick up speed during the 1970s and 1980s, and in this period some copies of old sáhkku game sets were made. During the 1980s and 1990s the game began to be sporadically played again in Máze, Inner Finnmark, and Lágesvuotna, coastal eastern Finnmark.

In the period around the change of the millennium, researchers began to take an interest in sáhkku and its history, leading to several articles published about the subject in English and French. Since then, several small internet-based actors have begun to offer sáhkku sets for sale, but the game is still not widely available on the market.

Since 2018, there have been several sáhkku playing events in Sápmi and elsewhere, among others annual open cups held by Sámi organizations in Oslo and in Unjárga. The cups are played in accordance with the Lágesvuotna rules.

== See also ==
- Daldøs, a south Scandinavian relative of Sáhkku.
- Tâb, a possible Middle Eastern relative of Sáhkku.
- Tablut, the Sámi version of the Scandinavian Tafl games, from which the rules of modern Hnefatafl are drawn. Although the name is similar, tablut is not a relative of tâb.
- Dablot Prejjesne, a Sámi game similar to alquerque and draughts.
