= Game of the Gods =

Board game motif in Norse mythology

In Norse mythology, the Game of the Gods is a motif associated with the golden age of the Æsir early in the mythic time cycle and with the survival of the new race of gods following the endtime of Ragnarök.

The relevant passages are found in Völuspá, the first at stanza 8 occurring after the creation of the universe during a time of peace and prosperity:

In their dwellings at peace they played at tables
Of gold no lack did the gods then know

Here the playing at tables refers to Tafl, a family of ancient Germanic board games somewhat resembling chess, although which variant of Tafl is being played or its rules are not known. At this point a long period of struggle and conflict begins with the arrival of three powerful giant maidens from Jötunheim, possibly the three great Norns. What follows in the Völuspá is a synopsis of the entire mythology until the gods and the universe are destroyed during the final conflict of Ragnarök. However, a new earth is reborn from the sea, green and beautiful, and those gods who have survived the battle and conflagration gather to share their memories of the past. The Völuspá describes how Baldr and his brother Hödr return together once again and are reconciled, and, at stanza 61, that in the grass are found tangible artifacts from an earlier time:

In wondrous beauty shall be found
The golden table pieces in the grass
That the gods possessed in days of old

In this context then, the gaming figures are a symbol of hope and regeneration and the survival of a new family of gods, bringing the mythology full circle.
