= Italian Damone =

Strategy board game

Position: d8 white pawn, f8 white queen, h8 white king, e7 white pawn, f6 white pawn, h6 white queen, a5 black pawn, g5 white pawn, b4 black pawn, h4 white pawn, a3 black queen, c3 black pawn, d2 black pawn, a1 black king, c1 black queen, e1 black pawn

Italian Damone starting position

Italian Damone is a two-player abstract strategy board game from Italy. It belongs to the draughts (checkers) family, and it is specifically a diagonal checkers variant. Each player's pieces are initially placed on two opposite corners of the board and move towards the opposite corner with the possibility of promotion for most of its pieces. The flow of the game is generally between these two opposite corners hence the diagonality of the game. Each player only has eight pieces to start the game, which is relatively small compared to most checker variants. Unlike the undifferentiated pieces as found in most checker variants at the beginning of the game, the pieces in Italian Damone are already differentiated by rank. The pieces are ranked from high to low as Damone, Damas, and Pedine. The Damone is sometimes referred to as Imperatore. The standard game has 1 Damone, 2 Damas, and 5 Pedines for each player. A player's piece can only capture an opposing piece if the opposing piece is the same rank or lower; therefore, it cannot capture a higher ranked piece.

As mentioned earlier, Italian Damone is an example of diagonal checkers. But among non-diagonal checkers, the game closely resembles Italian draughts and Dablot Prejjesne as these games have the common feature that pieces can only capture opposing pieces of the same rank or lower.

There are a few variants of Italian Damone. One variant starts off with 3 Damas and 3 Pedines with no Damones. Another variant requires only the capture of all Damones to win the game which makes the game more dynamic, and resembles Chess.

In Italian, Damone means "big king", Dama means "king", and Pedine means "checker man".

== Goal ==
In the standard game, the player who captures all their opponent's pieces is the winner. Alternatively, stalemating the enemy's pieces by not allowing them to move is a win for a player.

In some other variants, it is enough only for a player to capture all their opponent's Damones to win the game.

== Equipment ==
A standard 8 x 8 draughts board is used. In the standard game, each player has 1 Damone, 2 Damas, and 5 Pedines. One plays the red pieces, and the other player plays the black pieces.

Another variant consist of 3 Damas and 3 Pedines, but no Damones. However, pieces can be promoted to higher ranks such as Damone.

== Rules ==
1. Players decide what colors to play, and who starts first.

2. Pieces are played only on the black diagonal squares of a standard draughts board.

3. Each player plays from a corner of the board opposite from each other. Each player's pieces are set up on their corner of the board. Each player's Damone is at the corner black square. The 2 Damas are found on the next diagonal of black squares, and specifically at the squares that lie on the edges. The 5 Pedines are found on the next diagonal of black squares.

3. Players may either move one piece in a turn, or use one piece to capture enemy piece(s) in a turn. Players alternate their turns.

4. A Pedine moves and captures in three directions. Since the setup of the pieces are on opposite corners of the board, moving "forward" means moving diagonally toward the enemy's direction. For example, if a player starts from the lower right-hand corner of the board, then moving forward means moving in a northwest direction (towards the upper left corner of the board). Additionally Pedines may move "sideways" in two directions. In this example, the player can move their Pedine in a northeast direction (towards the upper right corner of the board), or in a southwest directions (towards the lower left corner of the board). Pedines can never move or capture "backwards" which in this case would be toward the southeast direction (lower right corner of the board).

Damas and Damones can move and capture in all four directions.

All pieces may move only one space diagonally onto a vacant black square on the board in a turn.

5. Pieces can only capture enemy pieces of the same rank or lower. The Damone is the highest ranked piece, and therefore can capture all types of pieces from the other player including their Damone. The Dama is the second highest ranked piece, and can capture only the other player's Damas and Pedines, and not the Damone. The Pedine is the lowest ranked piece, and can only capture the other player's Pedine, and not the Damas or Damones.

6. A piece captures by the short leap as in most draughts games. The piece leaps over the adjacent enemy piece onto a vacant square on the other side. Captures are compulsory. Multiple captures are allowed, and must be taken.

Players must choose the highest rank capturing line available to them.

Capturing lines are ranked as follows from highest to lowest preference:

- i) The capture with the longest capturing line has the highest preference.
- ii) If two or more capturing lines have equal number of captures, then the Damone's capturing line is preferred over the Damas' capturing line or the Pedine's capturing line; furthermore, the Damas' capturing line is preferred over the Pedine's capturing line.
- iii) If a decision still cannot be made (for example, a situation where two Damones have an equal number of pieces that can be captured), then one must look at the highest ranked piece on each capturing line. The capturing line with the highest ranked piece in it must be taken.
- iv) If a decision still cannot be made (for example, a situation where two Damones have an equal number of pieces that can be captured, and each have at least one Damone in their capturing line), then the capturing line that contains the most number of the highest ranked piece must be taken.

Example #1: Two Damones (Damones A and Damones B) can capture in a player's turn.

Damone A can capture 2 Damones and 1 Pedine

Damone B can capture 1 Damone and 2 Damas

Both capturing lines have an equivalent number of pieces (3 pieces), and therefore rule (i) does not apply. Both capturing pieces are Damones, and therefore rule (ii) does not apply. Both capturing lines have a Damone as their highest ranked piece, and therefore rule (iii) does not apply. However, Damone A can capture 2 Damones, whereas, Damone B can only capture 1 Damone. By rule (iv), Damone's A capturing line must be taken.

Example #2: One Damone has two capturing lines.

Line A consist of 2 Damones and 1 Pedine

Line B consist of 1 Damone and 2 Damas

Both capturing lines have an equivalent number of pieces (3 pieces), and therefore rule (i) does not apply. There is only one capturing piece for both lines of capture, and therefore rule (ii) does not apply. Both capturing lines have a Damone as their highest ranked piece, and therefore rule (iii) does not apply. However, Lina A consist of 2 Damones, whereas, Line B consist only of 1 Damone. By rule (iv), Line A must be taken.

- v) If a decision still cannot be made, then preference is given to the capturing line that contains the next highest piece.
- vi) If a decision still cannot be made, the capturing line with the most number of next highest pieces is preferred. The same logic is applied over and over again until a decision is made.
- vii) However, if a decision cannot be made after this process, then the player may choose any of the capturing lines that he or she wishes.

Example #3: Two Damones (Damone A and Damone B) can capture in a player's turn.

Damone A can capture 1 Damone and 2 Damas.

Damone B can capture 1 Damone, 1 Dama, and 1 Pedine.

Both have an equal number of pieces to be captured (3 pieces), and therefore rule (i) does not apply. Both capturing pieces are Damones, and therefore rule (ii) does not apply. The highest piece in both capturing lines is a Damone, and therefore rule (iii) does not apply. Each capturing line has the same number of Damones (only 1 each), and therefore rule (iv) does not apply. The next highest piece on both capturing line is a Dama, and therefore rule (v) does not apply. However, Damone A can capture 2 Damas, whereas, Damone B can only capture 1 Dama, therefore by rule (vi), the capturing line that must be taken is that of Damone A.

Example #4: One Damas has two capturing lines.

Lina A consist of 1 Damas and 1 Pedine

Line B consist of 1 Damas and 1 Pedine

Both lines consist of an equal number of pieces (2 pieces each), and therefore rule (i) does not apply. There is only one capturing piece involved, and therefore rule (ii) does not apply. The highest piece in both capturing lines is a Damas, and therefore rule (iii) does not apply. Each capturing line has the same number of Damas (only 1 each), and therefore rule (iv) does not apply. The next highest piece on both capturing line is a Pedine, and therefore rule (v) does not apply. Each capturing line has the same number of Pedines (only 1 each), and therefore rule (vi) does not apply. A decision cannot be made yet based on the first six rules, and therefore, rule (vii) applies, and the player is free to choose either Line A or Line B to capture.

7. A Pedine is promoted to Dama when it lands on the two squares originally occupied by the other player's Damas. A Dama is promoted to Damone when it lands on the square originally occupied by the other player's Damone.

== Related Games ==
- Italian draughts
- Dablot Prejjesne
- Shatra
- Draughts
- Alquerque
