= Dablot Prejjesne =

Dablo
- Years active: First described by outsiders in the 1800s.
- Genres: Board game Abstract strategy game
- Players: 2
- Setup time: 1–2 minutes
- Playing time: 15–60 minutes
- Chance: None
- Skills: Strategy, tactics

Dablo (also called Dablot Prejjesne) is a family of two-player strategy board games of the Sámi people. Different variants of the game have been played in different parts of Sápmi.

== Names ==
The word "dablo" is a non-Sámi attempt to write the South Sámi word daabloe and the Lule Sámi word dábllo. This word actually just means "board game" or "gameboard". In South Sámi, daabloe may also mean "grid pattern".

Another term for the game is dablot prejjesne which is in modern South Sámi spelling daablodh prejjesne. This simply means "to play a board game on a board", as opposed to daablodh duoljjesne, which is a children's variant of the game that is played on a reindeer hide rather than a board.

The game is likely to have had another name than these among the Sámi, but outside researchers confused the name for the general activity "board gaming" with the name of the concrete games. This was also done when outside researchers wrote down the rules for the Sámi tafl game now called Tablut. In that case, the Lule Sámi word dábllut ("to play a board game") was mistaken for the name of the game.

In North Sámi, Dablo has been known as cuhkka, a word that means "broken" or "destroyed". The player who loses the game is said to be "cuhkka", cf. Checkmate.

== Description ==
The following describes one version of the South Sámi variant of the game, and is not representative for other dablo variants.

Sami people are represented in this game with one piece representing the Sami King ("gånneka"), one piece representing the Sami Prince ("gånnekan alke"), and 28 pieces representing their soldiers or warriors ("dårake"). The landowners are represented with one piece representing the landowner, one piece representing the landowner's son, and 28 pieces representing their peasants. The game is a relative of draughts and Alquerque. Pieces leap over one another to capture. However, the similarities basically end there. In draughts and Alquerque, any piece can capture any enemy piece whether that enemy piece is a King or not. In Dablot Prejessne, pieces can only capture each other if they are of the same rank or lower. They cannot capture pieces of a higher rank. The Sami King and the landowner are the highest ranked pieces and are equal in rank, therefore, they can capture each other and all other pieces. The Sami Prince and the landowner's son are the second highest ranked pieces, and are of equal rank. The Sami Prince can not capture the landowner, and likewise, the landowner's son can not capture the Sami King. However, they can capture each other, and all the other pieces. The 28 soldiers or warriors and the 28 peasants are the lowest ranked pieces. The 28 soldiers or warriors can not capture the landowner or the landowner's son. Likewise, the 28 peasants cannot capture the Sami King or the Sami Prince. However, they can capture each other. All pieces do move alike, and can move and capture in any direction. There is no promotion of pieces in Dablot Prejjesne.

Its closest relative in the draught family may be Italian Checkers and Italian Damone. In all these games, a lower rank piece can not capture a higher rank piece. However, in Dablot Prejjesne ranks are pre-determined, and never change, whereas, in Italian checkers, pieces must be promoted to King in order to gain higher rank. In Italian Damone there are pre-determined ranked pieces also, however, it is played on an 8 x 8 draughts board with far fewer pieces as compared to Dablot Prejjesne.

The board used is very similar to that of Kharbaga. The difference is that in Kharbaga, the board is 4 x 4 or 5 x 5 whereas in Dablot Prejjesne, the board is 6 x 7.

== Goal ==
A player wins if it captures all their opponent's pieces. There are additional winning conditions common in variants; see the rules section below. A draw is possible by mutual agreement or after a number of turns made by each player without a capture.

== Equipment ==
The board used is a 6 (width) x 7 (length) grid board with diagonal lines running through each "square" of the board. Pieces are placed on the intersections between gridlines similar to Alquerque and its variants, instead of within the square spaces as in other draughts variants.

Each player has 30 pieces total. One player traditionally plays the Sami tribe, which can be the red or white colored pieces, and one player plays the landowner party, which are the black colored pieces.

The Sami tribe consist of 1 Sami King piece, 1 Sami Prince piece, and 28 soldiers or warriors (referred to as soldiers in this article).

The Landowner party consist of 1 Landowner piece, 1 Landowner's Son piece, and 28 peasants.

For simplicity, both sides' pieces can be referred to by the names of the Sami side (King, Prince and Soldiers), as the distinction between the names for each side's pieces has no significant in-game meaning. This article will however use the appropriate names for each side.

== Rules and gameplay ==
1. Players decide what colors to play, and who starts first.

2. The 28 soldiers or peasants are initially set up on each player's half of the board, on each intersection of the gridlines of the first 5 ranks (including the intersections of the diagonals in between the "main" orthogonal grid). The Sami Prince is placed on the sixth rank, on the intersection of diagonals to that player's farthest right. The Sami King is placed on the seventh rank, at the right edge of the board (please refer to the image above and the first external link below for a visual description of the initial setup for both Sami tribe and landowner party). Similarly, the Landowner's Son and Landowner are placed on that player's farthest right on the sixth and seventh rank, respectively.

3. All pieces move alike. A piece moves one space along one of the gridlines to any adjacent, unoccupied intersection. All pieces can move forward or backward at any time. Only one piece may be moved per turn, or used to capture.

4. Pieces may capture other pieces by jumping over them, similar to draughts. The piece must jump over a single adjacent opposing piece, and land on an unoccupied space on the exact opposite side of the jumped piece from its starting location. The jumped opposing piece is removed from play. A piece cannot jump over two opposing pieces in one jump, nor may it jump over a piece of its own color or jump over a piece into a space that is occupied (whether by that player or his opponent). A piece can make multiple jumps in one turn, even changing direction from one jump to the next, as long as the prior rules are followed.

4a. As the original rules for Dablot Prejjesne are not completely known, it is unknown if capturing was originally compulsory. However, in modern play of the game, similar to other draughts variants, a player who has an available capture or chain of captures is required to make the capture(s). If the player has a choice regarding two or more pieces that can be used to capture, or between two or more "paths" for multiple captures by a single piece, the player may choose freely which piece to use or which sequence of captures to make, but cannot choose not to capture if one is possible.

5. Pieces can only capture opposing pieces of equal or lower rank. The Sami King and Landowner are the highest ranked pieces and are of equal rank to one another, therefore, they can capture each other, and all the other pieces. The Sami Prince and the Landowner's Son are the second highest ranked pieces, and cannot capture the Sami King or Landowner; however, they can capture each other, and the other lower pieces. The Sami soldiers and peasants are the lowest ranked pieces. They can not capture the Sami King or Sami Prince, or the Landowner or Landowner's Son; however, they can capture each other. This is a primary difference between Dablot and most other draughts variants.

6. There is no promotion of pieces in this game; a player cannot recover a captured King, Landowner, Prince or Son, or augment their numbers of these pieces.

=== Variations ===
Some variants of this game include additional winning conditions which further speed the pace of the game, such as:

- Trapping all remaining opposing pieces so that one's opponent cannot make a move - This is a common secondary winning condition, making stalemate a victory for the player who forces it, instead of a draw.
- Capturing the opposing King or Landowner - this is usually a crippling blow to a player in any case, as he can no longer win by capturing all his opponent's pieces; he can only do so by trapping his opponent's remaining forces as above.
- Capturing both the opposing King/Landowner and the Prince/Son - At this point, in the conflict being modeled in the game, the lower-ranking forces would likely surrender. Again, it is still possible though more difficult to win after losing both the King and Prince, by trapping all opposing pieces to force a stalemate.

== See also ==
- Italian Checkers
- Italian Damone
- Shatra
- Draughts
- Alquerque
- Kharbaga
- Sáhkku
- Tablut
