= Alea evangelii =

Boardgame

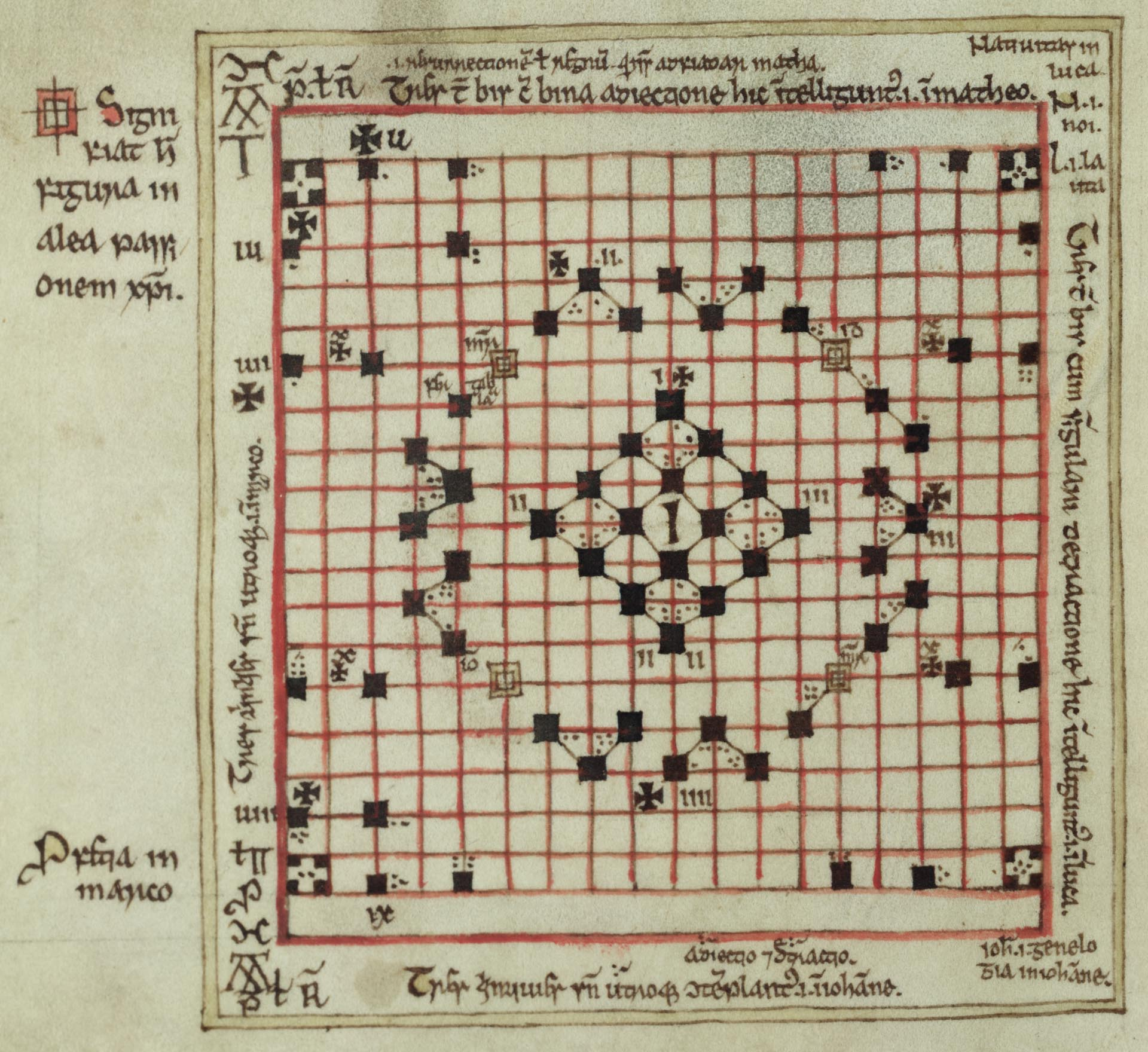
Diagram illustrating a variant of the Tafl game, from the 12th century manuscript CCC MS. 122

Alea evangelii (Game of the Gospels) is a member of the tafl family of games. Known from an illustration and account in Latin in an eleventh-century Irish manuscript where it is given a Christian scriptural context, the game is played on the intersections of an 18 by 18 squares game board (i.e. a board identical to a standard 19 × 19 grid board for playing Go). This is larger than that of most tafl games.

The manuscript, Corpus Christi College ms. 122 (folio 5 verso), attempts to give scriptural meaning to a hnefatafl variant, and, though the layout is unwieldy, its proportions are also found in a game board fragment unearthed at Wimose on the Danish island of Funen.

== Transmission of the game through CCC MS 122 ==
Manuscript CCC MS 122 is composed of 117 pages. It includes three sections: the ten Eusebian Canons (or tables) representing how each Gospel agrees with or differs from the others; the "Alea Evangelii" diagram and two pages of explanation in Latin; the Vulgate Latin version of the four Gospels, preceded by St. Jerome's prologue.

The manuscript is written in an Irish hand and is commonly dated to the eleventh century. The description of the game states that it was invented at the court of King Æthelstan of England (924–939) by two learned men: an anonymous Frank and Israel the Grammarian, one of the leading European scholars of his time. The diagram and its explanation were brought to Ireland by Dub Innse, bishop of Bangor (d. 953).

A photograph of the game is the frontispiece of The Times of St Dunstan by J. Armitage Robinson, who also reproduces and discusses the text. The captions that label the different sides of the diagram are in Latin with a note partly in Irish. Robinson copied an error by the eleventh-century scribe describing one of the inventors as a Jewish scholar at Æthelstan's court, and the error has been copied by modern scholars. The medieval Latinist Michael Lapidge pointed out that "Israel" is not a descriptive phrase but a reference to Israel the Grammarian.

Starting position in Murray's reconstruction: The King is marked with a blue X in the center.

== Christian allegory ==
Each of the four corners and borders of the diagram is assigned to one of the four Evangelists. 67 pieces are derived from the Eusebian Canons: each Canon defines a number of pieces corresponding to the square of its number of columns. Pieces defined by a specific canon are grouped together on the board: such groups are labeled by a cross and the number of the corresponding canon.

| Table # | Matthew | Mark | Luke | John | Pieces |
|---|---|---|---|---|---|
| Canon I. | Yes | Yes | Yes | Yes | 16 |
| Canon II. | Yes | Yes | Yes | | 9 |
| Canon III. | Yes | | Yes | Yes | 9 |
| Canon IIII. | Yes | Yes | | Yes | 9 |
| Canon V. | Yes | | Yes | | 4 |
| Canon VI. | Yes | Yes | | | 4 |
| Canon VII. | Yes | | | Yes | 4 |
| Canon VIII. | | Yes | Yes | | 4 |
| Canon IX. | | | Yes | Yes | 4 |
| Canon X | Yes | | | | 1 |
| Canon X | | Yes | | | 1 |
| Canon X | | | Yes | | 1 |
| Canon X | | | | Yes | 1 |
| | Total pieces | | | | 67 |

Four more pieces are painted in red (all the others are painted in black) and in the manuscript are mentioned as "different men" (varios viros): two of these four pieces are assigned to the Evangelist John (N14, F6), the other to Mark (N6, F14). The four “different men” are also labeled on the board as related to the passion of Christ. One of the black pieces (E13) is referenced in the manuscript as "the primary man" and "belongs to none of the evangelists"; it represents "the Unity of the Trinity", the one purpose of the four evangelists. Finally, "the figure 1 in the middle of the alea signifies the indivisible substance of the Trinity, or the supremacy of the first canon".

The 16 pieces of Canon I form the diamond at the center of the board. Canons II, III and IIII, together with the four "different men" and the "primary man", form the circle surrounding the central diamond. Canons V, VI, VII, VIII, IX are organized horizontally along the lines of the board. The four pieces corresponding to each of the four Evangelists in Canon X are placed in the four quadrants of the board (C14, Q14, C6, Q6).

Barbet-Massin notes that this is not the only case in which a tafl game is associated with the Gospels: Cormac's Glossary (c. 900 CE) describes Fidchell as

"likeness of a church" because "the fidchell is four-cornered, its squares are right-angled, and black and white are on it ... So also the church in all particulars: fed by four gospels in the four quarters of the earth ...; it is straight in judgements with the rows of scripture; black and white, i.e. good and bad, live in the church".

== As a tafl game ==
Scholars agree on the fact that the Christian allegory presented in MS 122 is a "moralization" of a pre-existing game: i.e. a Christian meaning has been superimposed on a game which originally was not related with religion. This is made clear by a short passage at the beginning of the manuscript, which suggests that the original game represented a siege:

If any one would know this game fully, before all the lessons of this teaching he must thoroughly know these seven: to wit, dukes and counts, defenders and attackers, city and citadel, and nine steps twice over.

Murray identified the diagram in MS 122 with a tafl board. He corrected the diagram in order to make it radially symmetric. The fact that the number of pieces (excluding the central "king") is a multiple of twelve is consistent with other documented games of the family: tawlbwrdd (36 pieces) and tablut (24 pieces). Since, in those games, the attacking side has twice as many pieces as the defending side, it is commonly assumed that in Alea Evangelii there are 48 attacking pieces and 24 defending pieces. Actually, the manuscript mentions the existence of attackers and defenders, but the two sides are not differentiated on the diagram, which only presents the details of how the pieces are assigned to the four evangelists according to the Christian allegory which is the main subject of the text. In other tafl games the goal of the attacker is to capture the king and the goal of the defender is to make the king escape from the board, it has been assumed that this is the case also with the game on which the Alea Evangelii moralization was based.

Games of the tafl family only have two kinds of pieces: a king that occupies the center of the board in the initial layout and a number of ordinary pieces divided between attackers and defenders with a 2:1 ratio. The "dukes and count" that appear in Alea Evangelii do not seem to fit this simple scheme. Mac White notes that CCC MS 122 "mentions dukes and knights, presumably pieces, which is rather puzzling". According to Bayless, "there is no precedent for such an elaborate distinction of pieces in other games played in Anglo-Saxon England, and the archaeological record shows no evidence of such pieces. It is tempting to suggest that on his travels, perhaps in Rome, Israel may have heard of the new game just beginning to circulate in Europe, chess, with its comites, milites, and other pieces, and borrowed the idea of different ranks from that game".

While all other scholars have assumed that the game is played on a 19×19 board, Barbet-Massin's opinion is that the external lines of the board do not make part of the playing area, so that the actual size of the board is 17×17.

== See also ==
- Tafl games
