= Tafl games =

Group of asymmetric boardgames

Tafl
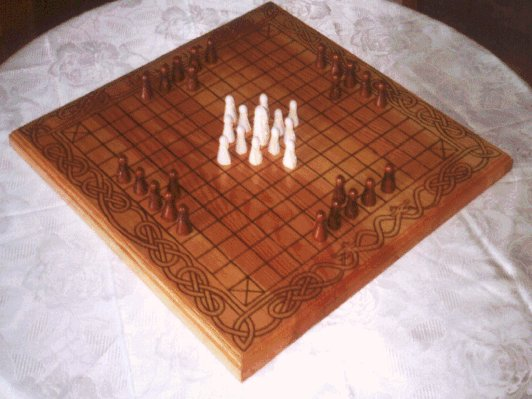
- A reconstructed hnefatafl gameboard
- Years active: 4th–12th centuries
- Genres: Board game; Abstract strategy game
- Players: 2
- Setup time: < 1 minute
- Playing time: Typically 5–20 minutes
- Chance: None
- Skills: Strategy, tactics
- Synonyms: Hnefatafl

Tafl games (pronounced [tavl]), also known as hnefatafl games, are a family of ancient Northern European strategy board games played on a checkered or latticed gameboard with two armies of uneven numbers. Names of different variants of tafl include hnefatafl, tablut, tawlbwrdd, brandubh, Ard Rí, and alea evangelii. Games in the tafl family were played in Norway, Sweden, Denmark, Iceland, Britain, Ireland, and Sápmi. The Roman latrunculi influenced the development of tafl games during the medieval period. Tafl gaming was eventually supplanted by chess in the 12th century, but the tafl variant of the Sámi people, tablut, was in play until at least the 18th century. The rules for tablut were written down by the Swedish naturalist Linnaeus in 1732, and these were translated from Latin to English in 1811. All modern tafl games are based on the 1811 translation, which had many errors. New rules were added to amend the issues resulting from these errors, leading to the creation of a modern family of tafl games. Tablut is now also played in accordance with its original rules, which have been retranslated.

== Etymology ==
English has borrowed the term from tafl (pronounced [tavl]; Old Norse for 'table'), a generic term referring to board games.

Hnefatafl (roughly [hnevatavl], plausibly realised as [n̥ɛvatavl]), became the preferred term for the game in Scandinavia by the end of the Viking Age, to distinguish it from other board games, such as skáktafl (chess), kvatrutafl (tables) and halatafl (fox games), as these became known. The specific name hnefatafl possibly arose as meaning "board game of the fist", from hnefi ("fist") + tafl, where "fist" referred to the central king-piece.

The precise etymology is not entirely certain but hnefi certainly referred to the king-piece, and several sources refer to hnefatafl as "king's table". In Anglo-Saxon England, the term tæfl also referred to many board games. It is not known if the Anglo-Saxons had a specific name for the game or if they generically referred to it as tæfl in the way that modern people might refer to "cards".

Several games may be confused with tafl games, due to the inclusion of the word tafl in their names or other similarities. Halatafl is the Old Norse name for fox and geese, a game dating from at least the 14th century. It is still known and played in Europe. kvatrutafl is the Old Norse name for tables (the medieval forerunner of backgammon). Skáktafl is the Old Norse name for chess. Fidchell or fithcheall (Modern Irish: ficheall) was played in Ireland. The Welsh equivalent was gwyddbwyll and the Breton equivalent gwezboell; all terms mean "wood-sense". This popular medieval game was played with equal forces on each side and thus was not a tafl variant, but rather may have been the medieval descendant of the Roman game latrunculi or ludus latrunculorum. However, tafl games may be evidence that the Roman game latrunculi or ludus latrunculorum was also played with handicaps, much as Capablanca's chess pieces most likely derive from a 16th and 17th century practice of playing at odds of the weaker player having an Amazon or royal crowned knight.

== Variants ==
The only variant of tafl where a relatively unambiguous ruleset has survived into modern times is tablut, the Sámi variant of the game, which was recorded by Linnaeus during his expedition to Lapland in 1732.

As for the medieval game, no complete, unambiguous description of the rules exists, but the king's objective was to escape to (variously) the board's periphery or corners, while the greater force's objective was to capture him. Although the size of the board and the number of pieces varied, all games involved a distinctive 2:1 ratio of pieces, with the lesser side having a king-piece that started in the centre.

There is some controversy over whether some tafl games (i.e. Hnefatafl and Tawlbwrdd) may have employed dice.

Alea Evangelii board

=== Alea evangelii ===
Alea evangelii, which means "game of the gospels", was described, with a drawing, in the 12th-century manuscript 122 of Corpus Christi College, Oxford, from Anglo-Saxon England. It was played on a 19×19 board of intersections. The manuscript describes the layout of the board as a religious allegory, but it is clear that this was a game in the Tafl family.

=== Ard Rí ===
Ard Rí board

Ard Rí (Gaelic for 'High King') was a Scottish tafl variant played on a 7×7 board with a king and eight defenders against sixteen attackers. This is the least documented of the known tafl variants. One of the generally accepted rules, the king escaping to any edge square and not just to any corner square, gives the defending side an insurmountable advantage. This advantage is so strong that the game is solved, with the king always able to escape and thus the defender will always win.

=== Brandubh ===
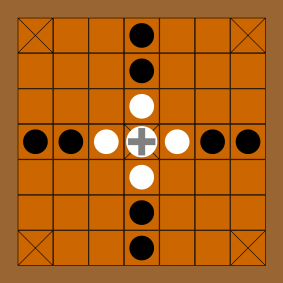
Brandub board

Brandubh (or brandub) (Irish: bran dubh) was the Irish form of tafl. From two poems it is known that it was played with five men against eight, and that one of the five was a "Branán", or chief. A number of 7×7 boards have been found, the most famous being the elaborate wooden board found at Ballinderry in 1932, featuring holes for pegged pieces, possibly to allow for portability of the game. The name brandubh means "black raven".

Original rules were not found, but using these 7×7 boards, the text of the two poems and the tablut rules as a basis, the World Tafl Federation was able to reconstruct balanced rules validated by several tests.

Despite its small size board and the speed of the games, Brandubh offers an undeniable tactical and strategic exercise in which the first mistake very often leads to defeat. The small number of pieces means that each of them must often simultaneously defend and attack: it is therefore easy to forget one of these tasks if one focuses too much on the other. As in the great games of Tafl, sacrifices are useful, especially for the defenders, but with only four pieces, it is important not to weaken the king too early in the game.

=== Hnefatafl ===
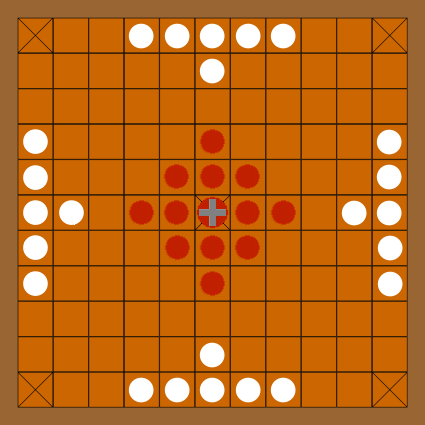
Hnefatafl board

Hnefatafl (sometimes now referred to as Viking chess) was a popular game in medieval Scandinavia and was mentioned in several of the Norse sagas. Some of these saga references have contributed to controversy over the possible use of dice in playing hnefatafl. The rules of the game were never explicitly recorded, and only playing pieces and fragmentary boards are extant, so it is not known for sure how the game was played. If dice were in fact used, nothing has been recorded about how they were employed. Archaeological and literary sources indicate hnefatafl may have been played on a 13×13 or an 11×11 board.

Hnefatafl became a popular game in Northern Europe during the Viking era (end of the 8th century to 1000 CE), a turbulent time full of conflicts. When chess became a popular game during the Middle Ages, the rules of hnefatafl were forgotten over time. Hnefatafl was particularly popular in Nordic countries and followed the Viking civilization to other parts of Europe, primarily to the British Isles and the Viking country of Garðaríki in what is now part of Russia.

The game developed differently at different locations. Archaeologists have found editions in places such as Ireland and Ukraine. Hnefatafl literally translates to "fist table", from the Old Norse (equivalently in modern Icelandic) hnef, 'fist', and tafl, 'table'.

==== Modern hnefatafl ====
The rules for Norse tafl were lost, but in the 1900s attempts were made to reconstruct the game based on the rules for the Sámi tafl game tablut. The rules for tablut had been written down in the 1700s, and translated from Latin to English in the 1800s (see § Tablut). Unfortunately, the rules were poorly translated from Latin and gave unbalanced gameplay, mainly due to the mistaken idea that the king must be surrounded on four sides to be captured – instead of two. Different innovations were made to create a game that favoured the defender side less, such as limiting the king's escape possibilities to the corners (instead of the entire edge of the board), making the king "weaponless" (unable to participate in capture), making the initial starting points of the attackers inaccessible for the king, and making it easier to capture the king against the corner fields of the board.

Today, many different versions of modern hnefatafl are in play – both online and on physical boards that are sold commercially. One variant used in tournaments is Copenhagen hnefatafl, which also features a "shield wall" mechanism to capture several soldiers at once, and an "exit fort" rule that enables the king to escape on the edge while otherwise being limited to escape in the corners.

=== Tablut ===
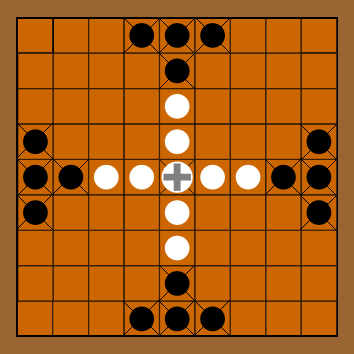
Tablut board

This variant, from Sápmi, is the best documented historical tafl variant. It is unique among tafl games in that it is known to have still been played in the 18th century. It may also have survived into the late 19th century. P. A. Lindholm (1884) wrote that the Sámi played a chess-like game where the pieces were called "Swedes and Russians", which follows Sámi tafl terminology.

Carl Linnaeus recorded the rules of tablut and a drawing of the board and pieces in his journal, during his 1732 "Expedition to Lapland" where he travelled in the area of the Lule Sámi – along the Lule River on the Swedish side of the border, and in Salten on the Dano-Norwegian side of the border.

The game may have been called something other than tablut by the Sámi, since the word tablut (also rendered dablut) simply means "to play board games". Linnaeus likely misunderstood the word describing the general activity as the name of the game. However, tablut has been established as its modern name, since no other name for it is known. For the same reason, another traditional Sámi board game is today called dablo or dablot which similarly just means "game board" and "playing a board game".

The game was played on a 9×9 mat of embroidered reindeer hide. In his diary, Lachesis Lapponica, Linnaeus explained that the players referred to the defending pieces as "Swedes" and the attacking pieces as "Muscovites". The name of the latter pieces reflect the Grand Duchy of Moscow, a regional rival of Sweden. Linnaeus does not describe the pieces as being differently colored, but his drawing shows that one side's pieces are distinguished by being notched (the Muscovites). This way of distinguishing board game pieces is known from other traditional Sámi board games (cf. Sáhkku and Dablo).

Lachesis Lapponica was translated into English in 1811 by James Edward Smith. The translation of the tablut rules (which was done by a Swedish merchant in London, Carl Troilius) had many errors which would become an issue not only for playing tablut, but also for the subsequent attempts to reconstruct other historic tafl games on the basis of the tablut rules. The central mistake in Troilius' translation is that according to these rules, four attackers are always needed to capture the king, whereas the original rules only demand two, except in special cases. The following rules are based on the modern translations of John C. Ashton (2007), Nicolas Cartier (2011) and Olli Salmi (2013):

==== Setup ====
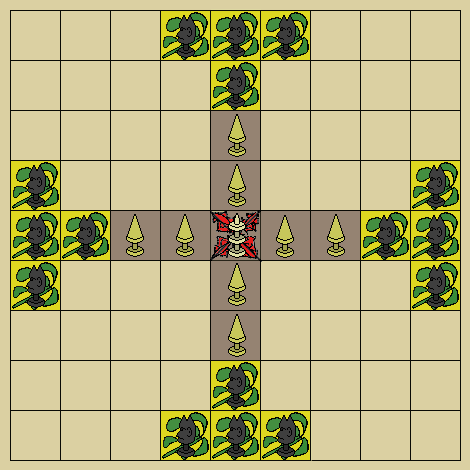
Tablut starting position: lighter "Swedes" start in centre; darker "Muscovites" start at the board's edges. Based on Linnaeus' sketches reproduced in Smith (1811).

- The game is played on a 9×9 board. Initial setup is as shown.
- The king (konakis, modern Lule Sámi gånågis) starts on the central square or castle (Latin: Arx).
- The eight defenders, called Swedes, start on the eight squares adjoining the gånågis, in the form of a cross.
- The sixteen attackers, called Muscovites, start in groups of four at the centre of each edge of the board, in direct contact with the Swedish "cross".

==== Goal ====
- The Swedes win if the king escapes to any of the fields at the edge of the board.
- The Muscovites win if they capture the king.

==== Movement and capture ====
- Any piece may move any number of vacant spaces in any straight line [←↑→↓], but not diagonally. (Cf. the rook in chess.)
- No piece may ever pass over another piece in its path.
- A player captures an enemy piece and removes it from the board by moving a piece so that the enemy piece becomes surrounded on two opposite sides (horizontally or vertically – not diagonally) by two friendly pieces. The king is also captured in this way, except in a few select cases where he is protected by the castle. A piece may move between, or stop in-between, two enemy pieces without being captured.

==== Capturing around the castle ====
- When the castle is not occupied by the king, it is "hostile" to all soldiers – attackers and defenders. This means that an enemy soldier may be captured by pinning it (horizontally or vertically) between one of one's own piece and the castle.
- If the king is on a square adjoining the castle (horizontally or vertically) he must be surrounded on the three remaining sides by his enemies to be captured.
- If the king is inside the castle, he is not captured until he is surrounded on all four sides.
- If the king is in the castle and surrounded on three sides by attackers, but protected by a defender on the last side, it is possible to capture the last defender by pinning it between an attacker piece and the occupied castle.
- The latter is the only situation in which the attackers may capture a defender against the occupied castle. The defenders may capture an attacker between one of their own and the occupied castle, since the king then participates in capturing.

==== Moving through the castle ====
- The only unclarity in the modern translation of the tablut rules concerns the castle. Resultantly, tablut is currently played in two variants: In one variant, the castle cannot be entered by any piece, not even the king, once the king has left it. In another variant, the king may re-enter the castle, and both attackers and defenders may pass through it but not stop in it.

==== Warning rules ====
- If the king should ever have an unimpeded path to the edge of the board, he must call out "raichi" (modern spelling: rájgge), meaning "opening" or "hole", and if he has two paths of escape, then he must call out "tuichu" (modern spelling. dujgu) (cf. "check" and "checkmate" in chess).

=== Tawlbwrdd ===
Tawlbwrdd board

This variant (pronounced [ˈtau̯lbʊrð]) was played in Wales. It is described as being played with 8 pieces on the king's side and 16 on the attacker's side. The rules were taken from an incomplete account of the game by Robert ap Ifan, with a drawing in a manuscript dated 1587, and the gaps were filled in by using Tablut rules. His version was played on an 11×11 board with 12 pieces on the king's side and 24 pieces on the opponent's side. His passage states:

The above tawlbwrdd should be played with a king in the centre and twelve men in the places next to him, and twenty-four men seek to capture him. These are placed, six in the centre of each side of the board and in the six central positions. And two move the men in the game, and if one [piece] belonging to the king comes between the attackers, he is dead and is thrown out of the game, and the same if one of the attackers comes between two of the king's men in the same manner. And if the king himself comes between two of the attackers, and if you say 'Watch your king' before he moves to that space, and he is unable to escape, you capture him. If the other says 'gwrheill'[?] and goes between two, there is no harm. If the king can go along the [illegible] line, that side wins the game.

=== Other modern games in the tafl family ===
Certain modern board games not generally referred to as "tafl", "tablut" or "hnefatafl" have nevertheless been based on tablut rules, or the rules of other tafl games reconstructed on the basis of tablut. They bear significant resemblance to the other tafl games, but with some important differences.

Around 1960, Milton Bradley published Swords and Shields, which was essentially Tablut as recorded by Linnaeus and erroneously translated by Troilius, but with the Swedes transformed into shields (with a king shield) and the Muscovites transformed into swords.

Breakthru was developed in the 1960s as part of the 3M bookshelf game series. It features tafl-like symmetry, but with twelve defenders plus one "flagship" (cf. king) pitted against twenty attackers upon a tiered board, so that the objective of the defenders is to escort the flagship from the centre to the outer zone of the board. Apart from the distinction of the inner zone and outer zone, there are no distinctive spaces on the Breakthru board. Breakthru also features a distinctive double move, whereas no evidence points to such a move in any of the historical games.

Thud, a modern game inspired by a series of fantasy novels by Terry Pratchett (which in turn were inspired by the historical tafl games, as reflected in the game's Dwarfish name, Hnaflbaflsniflwhifltafl), also features the general symmetry of tafl games, although it is played on an octagonal board with only eight defenders pitted against thirty-two attackers. Thud also features a "Thudstone" (cf. konakis), but no kingpiece. There are also important differences in the moves and attacks in Thud.

== Balance of play ==
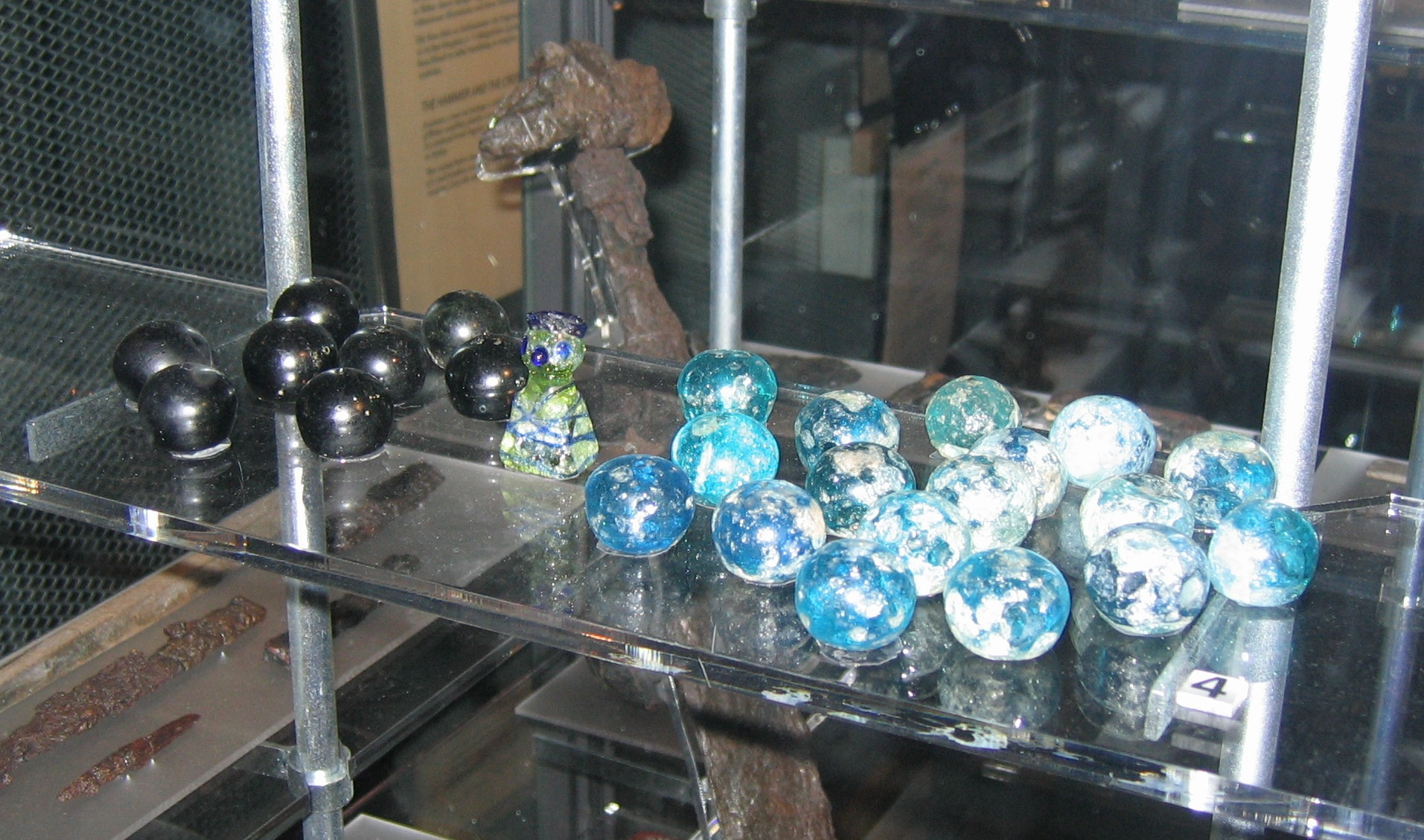
Tafl pieces from Birka in the Swedish Museum of National Antiquities in Stockholm

There have long been controversies concerning imbalance of the game, as rules for certain modern tafl games strongly favor the defenders. This imbalance results from a mistranslation of Linnaeus' rules for tablut, a Sámi tafl game from the 1700s, which were subsequently used as the basis for reconstructions of rules for medieval tafl. Newer translations of Linnaeus' tablut rules reveal a balanced game. After this change, tablut can be said to be slightly in favor of the attackers rather than the defenders: according to statistics, the attackers overall win marginally more often (on average 9% more).

Several rule modifications can produce more balanced play than in the mistranslation of the tablut rules. These include a weaponless king (the king cannot participate in captures), escape to the corners (rather than to the edges), or hostile attacker camps (the king and defenders may be captured against a vacant attacker camp square). Schmittberger (1992) even reveals some workarounds to produce more balanced play without modifying the rules of gameplay.

One such solution is by bidding: Players take turns bidding on how many moves it will take them to win the game. The lowest bidder gets the king. Thus, one player may open with a bid of 15 turns, the other player may counter with a bid of 14 turns, and the first player, more confident in his ability to escape in 13 rounds than in his ability to contain for 14, may bid 13 and take the king's side. If that player does not escape within 13 turns, the other player wins. Another workaround is to play a two-round match, in which players switch sides after the first round. If the king escapes both rounds, the winner is the player whose king escaped in the fewest turns.

== In saga literature ==
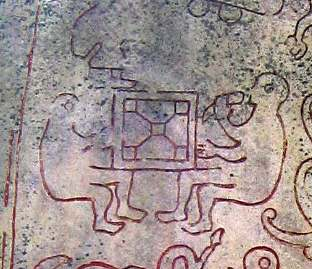
An illustration of people playing a Tafl game, from the Ockelbo Runestone, Sweden

Hnefatafl was mentioned in several of the medieval sagas, including Orkneyinga saga, Friðþjófs Saga, the Saga of Hervör and Heidrek, and others. These three period treatments of Hnefatafl offer some important clues about the game, while numerous other incidental references to Hnefatafl or Tafl exist in saga literature. Sagas help indicate the widespread use of board games just by mentioning them—although rituals varied in the Viking period from region to region, there were some underlying basics to culture. The fact that the sagas mention board games indicates this use because the sagas are read and understood by a very large audience.

In Orkeyinga saga, the notability of Hnefatafl is evident in the nine boasts of Jarl Rögnvald Kali Kolsson, who tops his list with skill at Tafl. In Friðþjófs Saga, a conversation over a game of Hnefatafl reveals that the king's men are red and the attackers white, and that the word hnefi does indeed refer to the kingpiece. The most revealing – and yet most ambiguous – clues to Hnefatafl lie in a series of riddles posed by a character identified as Odin in disguise (see Gestumblindi) in the Saga of Hervör and Heidrek.

One riddle, as stated in Hauksbók, refers to "the weaponless maids who fight around their lord, the [brown/red] ever sheltering and the [fair/white] ever attacking him", although there is controversy over whether the word weaponless refers to the maids or, as in other versions, to the king himself, which may support the argument that a "weaponless king" cannot take part in captures (see Balance of play above). One may also note that the assignment of the colours of brown or red to the defenders and fair or white to the attackers is consistent with Friðþjófs Saga.

Another of Gestumblindi's riddles asks, "What is that beast all girded with iron, which kills the flocks? He has eight horns but no head, and runs as he pleases." Here, it is the answer that is controversial, as the response has been variously translated as: "It is the húnn in hnefatafl. He has the name of a bear and runs when he is thrown"; or, "It is the húnn in hnefatafl. He has the name of a bear and escapes when he is attacked." The first problem is in translating the word húnn, which may refer to a die (as suggested by the former translation), the "eight horns" referring to the eight corners of a six-sided die and "the flocks" that he kills referring to the stakes the players lose. Alternatively, húnn may refer to the king, his "eight horns" referring to the eight defenders, which is more consistent with the latter translation, "He has the name of a bear and escapes when he is attacked." Ultimately, the literary references prove inconclusive on the use of dice in Hnefatafl.

== In archeological finds ==
There have been many archeological discoveries of tafl games and gaming pieces found in various Warrior Burials. One example was a wooden board and a single gaming piece made of horn found in a ship burial at Gokstad in southeastern Norway. Another example was twenty-two gaming pieces made of whalebone found in Orkney.

Some finds have occurred in religious sites. A gaming board dated to the 8th century or earlier, was dug up in 2018 at the site of the later Scottish Monastery of Deer. As another example, a small worked glass piece was discovered in 2019 on the Holy Island of Lindisfarne, target of a famous Viking raid in 793 CE. The piece was blue in colour, with swirls etched into the glass, and was topped with small white glass droplets, thought to symbolise a crown. The piece, thought to be a gaming piece for Hnefatafl or a related game, came from a trench that has been dated to the eighth to ninth centuries.

The material used to make both the board game and the gaming pieces has varied: from walrus ivory to bone to amber to wood. Numerous glass game pieces have been discovered in the mound of Birka in Sweden, as well as in northern Ukraine and Russia.

== Legacy ==
The first major attempt to revitalize tafl was the publication of "The Viking Game" in 1981. This was essentially the Sámi game tablut of the 1700s, as mistranslated by Troilius in 1811, and with the modern innovation that the king's escape possibilities were limited to the corners. The latter was done in order to compensate for the imbalanced gameplay resulting from the notion that the king must be surrounded on all four sides. In "The Viking Game" the pieces drawn by Linnaeus, which reflected traditional Sámi game piece design (see: Tablut), had been replaced by pieces influenced by Norse medieval aesthetics. The game booklet did not inform players that the rules were drawn from the Sámi game tablut, and claimed that "hnefatafl" was last played "in Lapland in 1732". The Sámi game terminology such as "raichi", "tuichu" and "konokis" was also not included in the booklet.

This game did much to spark the interest in tafl games, and also began the modern evolution of the game as players attempted to remedy the game which was still unbalanced in the king's favor.

In 2008, Hnefatafl was revived by Peter Kelly in the island of Fetlar in Shetland, where the annual World Quickplay Hnefatafl Championships are now held each summer under the auspices of the Fetlar Hnefatafl Panel. The term "quickplay" refers to the time limit of ten seconds per move, marked by the sounding of a gong. The Fetlar rules were for some time the standard in international hnefatafl play, but have since largely been superseded by Copenhagen Hnefatafl, which builds on Fetlar Hnefatafl.

After the rules for tablut were retranslated and published online (2007–2013), this historical game has also gained in popularity. A tournament was held in England in 2017.

Tafl games can be played online on sites similar to Chess.com. Aage Nielsen created his site in 1998, and currently hosts the World Tafl Federation Hnefatafl Championship Tournament. Another Hnefatafl game site was launched in 2014, by Jacob Teal and John Carlyle. Variants of tafl playable online today include Copenhagen Hnefatafl, Tablut, and many others.

== World Tafl Federation ==
In August 2011 the association 'World Tafl Federation' was formed, with Tim Millar – Chairman and Adam Bartley – Vice Chairman. Since 2011 the World Tafl Federation has been holding annual world hnefatafl championships.

=== World Tafl Federation Champions ===
This is a list of World Tafl Federation Champions:

Year	World Champion	Rules	Participants
2011	Tim Millar ("Crust"), Somerset, UK	Fetlar Hnefatafl 11×11	8 players
2012	Tim Millar ("Crust"), Somerset, UK	Fetlar Hnefatafl 11×11	13 players
2013	Arne Roland ("Nath"), Berlin, Germany	Copenhagen Hnefatafl 11×11	13 players
2014	John Doe ("Schachus" unknown name), Berlin, Germany	Copenhagen Hnefatafl 11×11	23 players
2015	Adam Bartley ("Adam"), Tønsberg, Norway	Copenhagen Hnefatafl 11×11	19 players
2016	Leo Kolassa ("Herjan"), Formby, UK	Copenhagen Hnefatafl 11×11	29 players
2017	Alexandre Bour ("Plantagenet"), Châlons-en-Champagne, France	Copenhagen Hnefatafl 11×11	29 players
2018	Mario Aluizo ("casshern"), Los Angeles, USA	Copenhagen Hnefatafl 11×11	26 players
2019	Mario Aluizo ("casshern"), Los Angeles, USA	Copenhagen Hnefatafl 11×11	25 players
2020	Mario Aluizo ("casshern"), Los Angeles, USA	Copenhagen Hnefatafl 11×11 Historical Hnefatafl 9×9 (Saami Tablut)	34 players
2021	Plamen Draganov ("Draganov"), Sofia, Bulgaria	Copenhagen Hnefatafl 11×11 Historical Hnefatafl 11×11 (Welsh Tawlbwrdd)	30 players
2022	Mario Aluizo ("casshern"), Los Angeles, USA	Copenhagen Hnefatafl 11×11 Historical Hnefatafl 11×11 (Saami Tablut & Welsh Tawlbwrdd)	33 players
2023	Plamen Draganov ("Draganov"), Sofia, Bulgaria.	Copenhagen Hnefatafl 11×11	36 players
2024	Mario Aluizo ("casshern"), Los Angeles, USA	Copenhagen Hnefatafl 11×11	34 players
2025	Mario Aluizo ("casshern"), Los Angeles, USA	Copenhagen Hnefatafl 11×11	36 players

== See also ==
- Alea evangelii, an elaborate Anglo-Saxon variant documented in a medieval manuscript
- Breakthru (board game), a modern game inspired by Tafl games
- Fidchell, an ancient Irish board game
- Fox games, e.g. Fox and Geese
- Game of the Gods, a Norse literary motif
- Tables (board game) an unrelated board game with a similar name
- Thud (game), a modern game inspired by Tafl games
