= Nesseby =

Nesseby may refer to:

- Nesseby Municipality, a municipality in Finnmark county, Norway
- Nesseby (village), a village in Nesseby Municipality in Finnmark county, Norway
- Nesseby Church, a church in Nesseby Municipality in Finnmark county, Norway
