= Balanit =

Woman assisting with Jewish ritual immersion

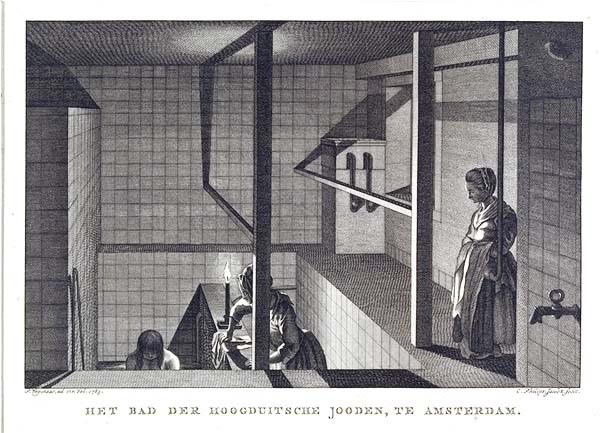
Balanit supervising mikveh attendants. 18th-century

Balanit (Hebrew: בלנית, from Ancient Greek: βαλανεῖον) is a Jewish woman who assists and supervises those immersing in the mikveh, a bath used for ritual immersion in Judaism, ensuring they fulfill the requirements of immersion in accordance with the Halakha (Jewish law).

== Etymology ==
The word "Balanit" originated from Anciet Greek word βαλανεῖον (bălănîon), which translates to "bathing-room".

== Origin ==
The requirement for a balanit arises from concern that a woman's hair might float during immersion, which would invalidate the immersion on the Halakhic level. The Rishonim - leading rabbis and halachic authorities from approximately the 11th to 15th centuries—debate whether a woman's immersion must be overseen by another woman, or if it is acceptable from the outset to loosely tie the hair with something that does not create a barrier (for example, a loose hairnet)

=== Halachic interpretation ===
According to Abraham ben David (Rabad), a Provençal rabbi and an important commentator on the Talmud - using a hairnet is always sufficient. Shlomo ibn Aderet (Rashba), medieval rabbi, halakhist, and Talmudist, said that it is permitted only if no supervisor is available at the moment. Asher ben Jehiel (Rosh), rabbi and talmudist from the 13th century, says that it is allowed to use a hairnet if there's no supervisor available.
