= Huldremose Woman =

Iron Age bog body found in Denmark

Coordinates: 56°26′40″N 10°37′50″E

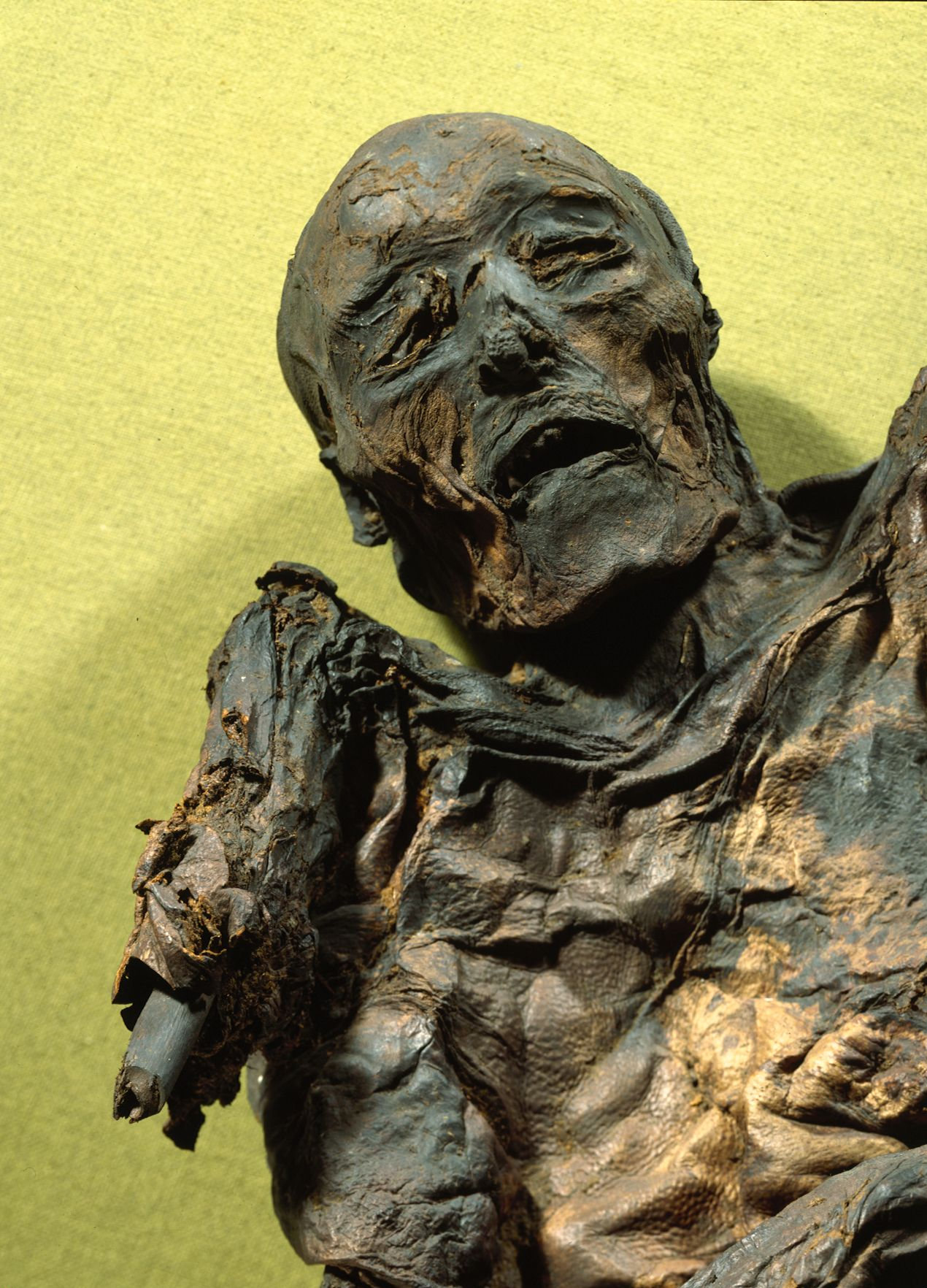
- Huldremose Woman, photographed in 1978
- Born: Unknown
- Died: 160 BCE – 340 CE; Ramten, Jutland, Denmark
- Body discovered: 15 May 1879; Ramten, Jutland, Denmark
- Resting place: National Museum of Denmark
- Other name: Huldre Fen Woman
- Known for: Exceptionally preserved Iron Age bog body; extensive textile assemblage

Huldremose Woman (Danish: Huldremosekvinden), also known as Huldre Fen Woman, is the naturally preserved body of an Iron Age woman discovered in 1879 in a peat bog near Ramten, Jutland, Denmark. Radiocarbon dating places her death between 160 BCE and 340 CE. Her body survived with preserved soft tissue and evidence of injuries around the time of her death, but the find is particularly notable for her clothing.

Huldremose Woman was discovered fully dressed in a layered costume of wool, animal skins and plant fibres. Her garments include two skin capes, a woollen skirt and scarf, and traces of a plant-fibre undergarment. Their exceptional preservation has allowed researchers to study Iron Age textile construction, dyes and the geographic origins of the materials used to make them.

== Discovery ==
The individual now known as Huldremose Woman was discovered on 15 May 1879 during peat cutting in Huldremose bog near Ramten, Jutland, Denmark. After digging about 1 metre (3.3 ft) into the peat, an unidentified worker uncovered her fully clothed body.

Believing the remains to be those of a recent murder victim, local authorities took Huldremose Woman to a nearby farm, where she was undressed, washed, and examined by a police constable, district physician and pharmacist.

Once it became clear that the body was that of an ancient woman, the criminal investigation was abandoned and Huldremose Woman was buried in the churchyard at Ørum. After the National Museum of Denmark learned of the discovery, it requested that she be exhumed. Huldremose Woman and her clothing were then transported by steamship to Copenhagen for archaeological examination and conservation.

== Condition ==
The body was found with the legs bent behind the back, and a nearly severed right arm. It is thought that the arm was damaged before she died. Apart from this, the corpse was well intact.

A rope was also found around the neck of the body, which suggests that she was hanged or strangled, although it may have been a necklace.

== Clothing and textile analysis ==
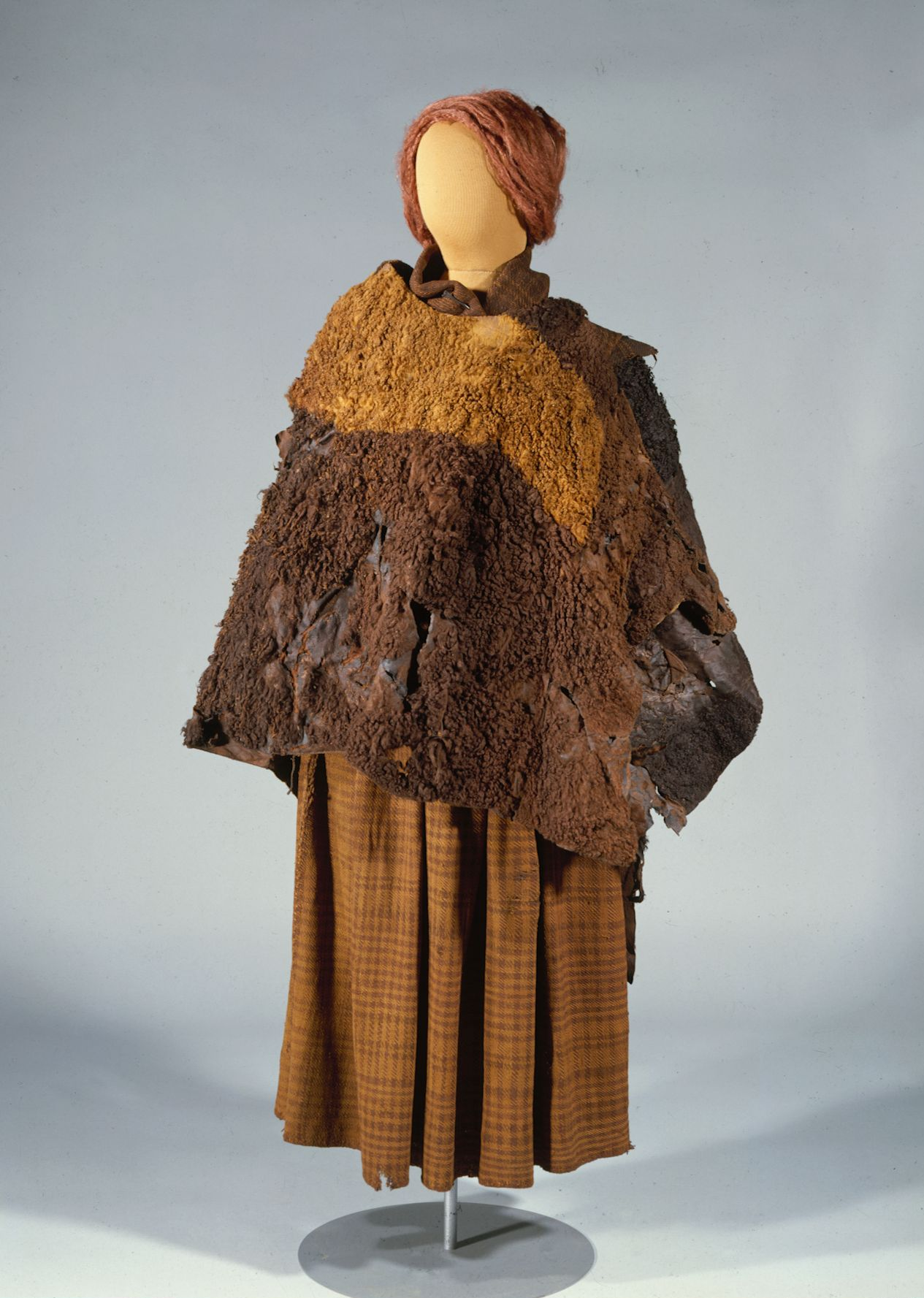
Surviving garments worn by Huldremose Woman, including her woollen skirt and scarf and two animal-skin capes

=== Clothing ===
Unlike many other bog bodies, which have often been found naked, Huldremose Woman was discovered clothed and accompanied by several personal items. Her clothing was made from wool, animal skins and plant fibres. The surviving evidence of a plant-fibre textile is rare.

Huldremose Woman wore two layered skin capes with their woolly sides facing outward. Beneath them, she wore a woollen plaid skirt and a woollen plaid scarf. The scarf was fastened with a pin made from bird bone.

Impressions left on her skin, together with a small amount of surviving degraded fibre, indicate that Huldremose Woman also wore a white inner garment beneath her woollen clothing. The plant-fibre garment extended from her shoulders to below her knees. Researchers have not identified the plant fibre from which it was made, although evidence from other textiles of the same period suggests that it may have been nettle.

A comb made from horn, a leather thong and a headband made from woollen textile were also found with Huldremose Woman. The objects appear to have been kept in a pocket made from a bladder on the inner cape.

=== Construction ===
Huldremose Woman's two capes were made from well-prepared, curly fleeces. Both had asymmetrical designs and necklines that slanted across her body.

Her outer cape was the larger of the two, measuring 82 cm (32 in) high and 170 cm (67 in) wide. It was assembled from five primary rectangular pieces of skin and two smaller triangular pieces beneath the yoke, the fitted section around her shoulders.

Most of the outer cape was made from dark sheepskin. Four pieces of lighter goatskin were inserted into its fur side. On the flesh side, its upper front section was lined with dark sheepskin. The researchers described this lining as a unique construction detail.

Her inner cape was slightly smaller, measuring 80 cm (31 in) high and 150 cm (59 in) wide. It was constructed from seven or eight primary pieces of sheepskin, most of them rectangular, together with 22 secondary patches made from sheep, goat and deerskin.

Researchers at the University of Copenhagen's Center for Textile Research, which was supported by the Danish National Research Foundation, and the National Museum of Denmark have extensively analysed Huldremose Woman's clothing. Their analyses showed that Scandinavian communities during the Early Iron Age knew and used a broad but previously unrecognized range of textile-weaving and dyeing technologies, as well as methods of working with animal skins.

=== Textile analysis ===
Although Huldremose Woman's surviving woollen clothing no longer retains its original appearance, analysis by researchers at the National Museum of Denmark showed that her skirt was originally woven in a blue or purple plaid pattern, while her scarf was originally red plaid.

Chemical dye analysis identified natural plant dyes and mordants, substances used to help dyes bind to textile fibres. Threads in at least five colours were woven together to create the complex plaid patterns.

The plant-fibre garment worn beneath Huldremose Woman's woollen clothing is known from impressions left on her skin and from the small amount of degraded fibre that survived. Researchers have not identified the precise fibre, although nettle has been proposed as one possibility based on other textile evidence from the same period.

=== Provenance ===
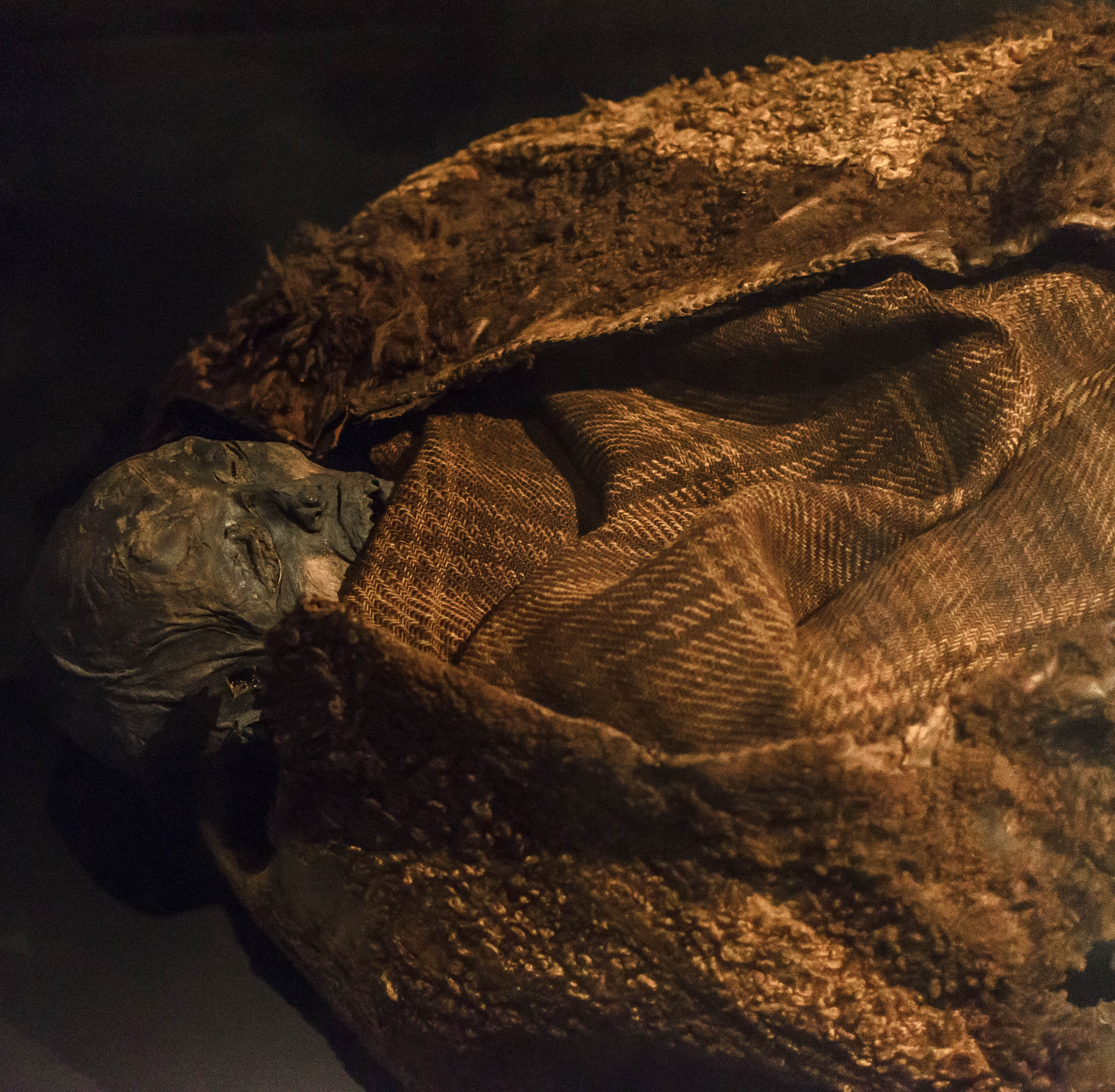
Huldremose Woman on display at the National Museum of Denmark, where her remains and clothing have been the subject of isotope and textile analyses

In 2009, archaeologist Karin Margarita Frei and her colleagues used strontium isotope analysis to investigate the geographic origins of Huldremose Woman and the clothing she wore.

The wool in Huldremose Woman's scarf had a local isotopic signature. Her skirt, however, was made from wool with at least three different provenances. These included wool with a local isotopic signature and wool with a signature compatible with northern Scandinavia, including areas of present-day Norway or Sweden.

The analysis indicated that Huldremose Woman and her plant-fibre garment were probably not local to the area where her body was found. Their isotopic signatures were also compatible with northern Scandinavia, although the analysis did not establish a specific place of origin.

The researchers suggested that completed textiles may have been traded or that raw materials may have been transported before being made into garments. The study indicated that textiles and textile materials may have moved more commonly and over longer distances during the Scandinavian Early Iron Age than had previously been assumed.

== Scientific study ==
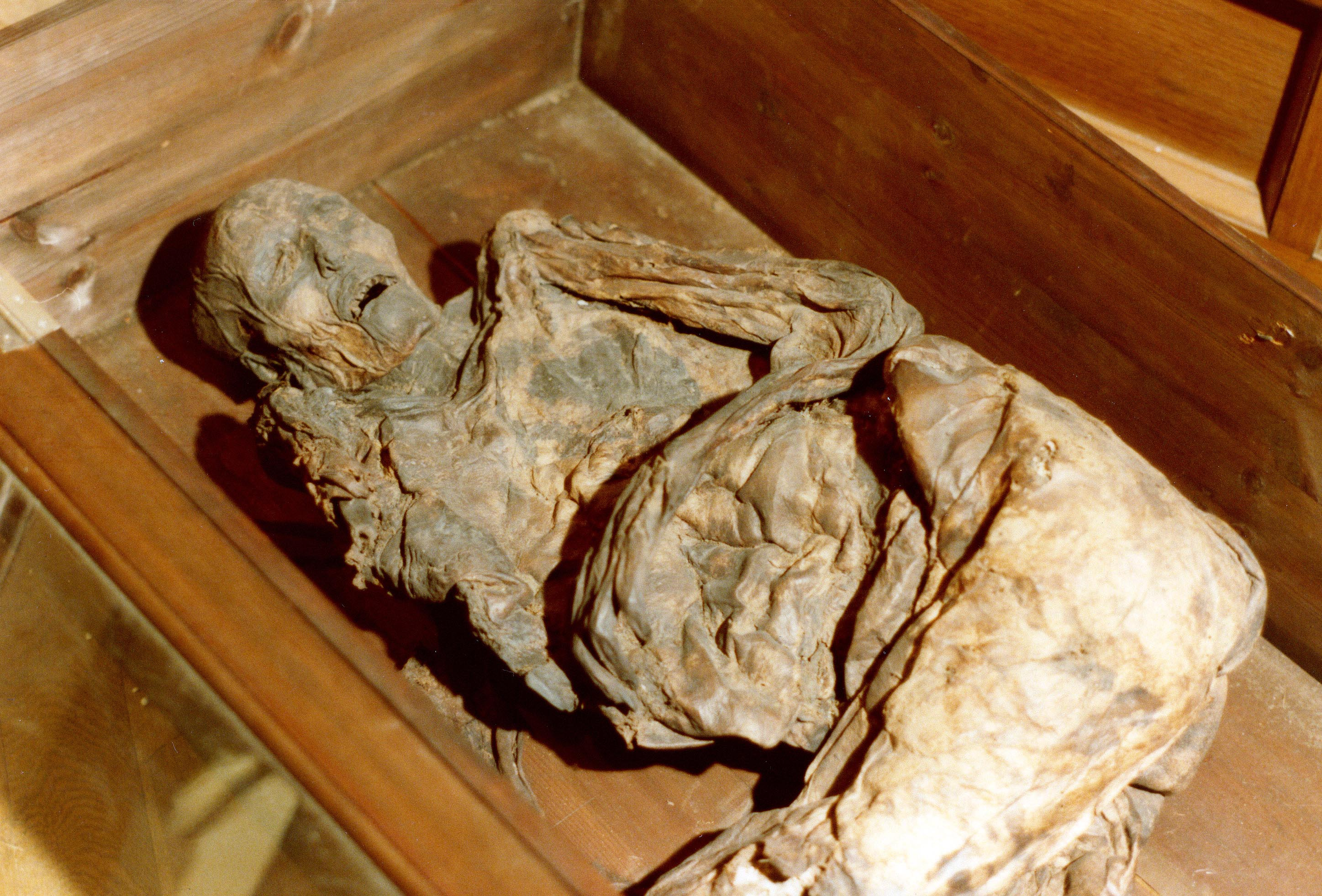
The preserved remains of Huldremose Woman, showing the flexed position of her body and surviving soft tissue

=== Body and health ===
Huldremose Woman was an adult, although her precise age at death is uncertain. Radiographic examination found little degenerative change in the joints of her spine, which researchers considered consistent with an age probably under 40. Partial calcification of her rib cartilage, however, suggested that she was older than a young adult.

The radiographs showed no substantial degenerative changes in her spine and no evidence of fractures or other injuries sustained during life in her ribs. Her hip and knee joints appeared normal, no definite Harris lines were identified in her long bones, and the joints of her feet showed no evidence of arthropathy. Her right clavicle was more robust than the left, which researchers suggested could indicate an old, well-healed fracture.

An unusual curvature of her right femur had previously been interpreted as evidence of a healed injury. Later radiography found no fracture callus and indicated that the curvature was probably caused after death by pressure on the bone after it had become demineralized in the bog.

Examination of her surviving scalp suggested that her head had been shaved. Long reddish hair was recorded behind her head when the body was discovered in 1879 and later became detached while the body was being cleaned. Researchers subsequently raised the possibility that the long hair had already been cut from her head and had been placed around it.

=== Radiographic examination ===
More than a century after Huldremose Woman was discovered, her remains were re-examined in 1990 using non-invasive radiography.

The examination showed that some of her soft tissue remained preserved, including hair stubble on her scalp and remnants of her brain within the cranium. It also showed that her bones had become demineralized during burial, a process commonly observed in bog bodies.

Radiography also clarified several of Huldremose Woman's injuries. It confirmed that one of her legs had been fractured but had healed before her death. The examination also contributed to a reassessment of cuts on one of her feet. Previously attributed to damage during the excavation of her body, the injuries were later considered more likely to have occurred around the time of her death.

=== Diet ===
A dietary analysis of Huldremose Woman's remains was conducted in 1999, more than a century after her body was discovered. Researchers examined two samples of her preserved gut contents and found that her final meal consisted mainly of grain and seeds.

The meal contained approximately three parts rye to one part corn spurrey seed, with the rye possibly mixed with some wheat. Numerous seeds from other wild plants were also present. The grain had been coarsely ground.

Similar mixtures of grain and wild seeds have been identified in the digestive contents of other Iron Age bog bodies, including Tollund Man and Grauballe Man. Holden compared the Huldremose mixture with coarse grain foods known from later historical periods. The surviving remains do not establish whether the meal was prepared as bread, porridge, or another type of food.

Researchers also found animal hair and fragments of animal tissue in her gut.

=== Dating ===
Huldremose Woman lived during the Iron Age, although estimates of when she lived have been refined through successive studies. Early radiocarbon dating of her body and the textiles buried with her produced dates ranging from the 2nd century BCE to the 4th century CE. Later research narrowed this estimate, placing her death between 160 BCE and 340 CE.

Researchers have suggested that differences between the dates obtained from Huldremose Woman and from individual garments may reflect differences in the age of the textiles.

== Cause of death ==
Huldremose Woman's exact cause of death is uncertain. In 1990, Don Brothwell, David Liversage and Birthe Gottlieb published a forensic and radiographic examination of her remains. They identified severe injuries to her arms and legs, several of which they considered likely to have been inflicted around the time of her death. Her right upper arm had been severed. Fine cut marks on her right forearm suggested that it may also have been struck or cut with a sharp implement. Cuts were also found on both lower legs and her right foot, some reaching the bone. Brothwell and his colleagues concluded that several of these injuries had been made with a sharp metal implement rather than the relatively blunt tools used to cut peat.

The researchers considered severe injury and blood loss a possible cause of death, but could not determine the order in which the injuries occurred. They distinguished these wounds from damage known to have happened when the body was discovered during peat cutting in 1879. This included the loss of fingers from her right hand. Some changes to the body were attributed by Brothwell and his colleagues to pressure and chemical changes after burial in the bog.

When Huldremose Woman was discovered in 1879, a woollen cord found with her hair was reported to have been wound several times around her neck. Brothwell and his colleagues considered it unlikely that the cord had reached this position accidentally, but found no physical evidence showing that she had been strangled. They considered severe injury and blood loss a possible cause of death, but their examination did not establish which injury killed her or exactly how she died.

== Exhibition ==
The mummified remains are exhibited at the National Museum of Denmark. The elaborate clothing worn by Huldremose Woman has been reconstructed and displayed at several museums.

== See also ==
- List of Danish bog bodies
