= Egtved Girl =

Bronze Age girl found in Egtved, Denmark

Coordinates: 55°37′42″N 9°16′57″E

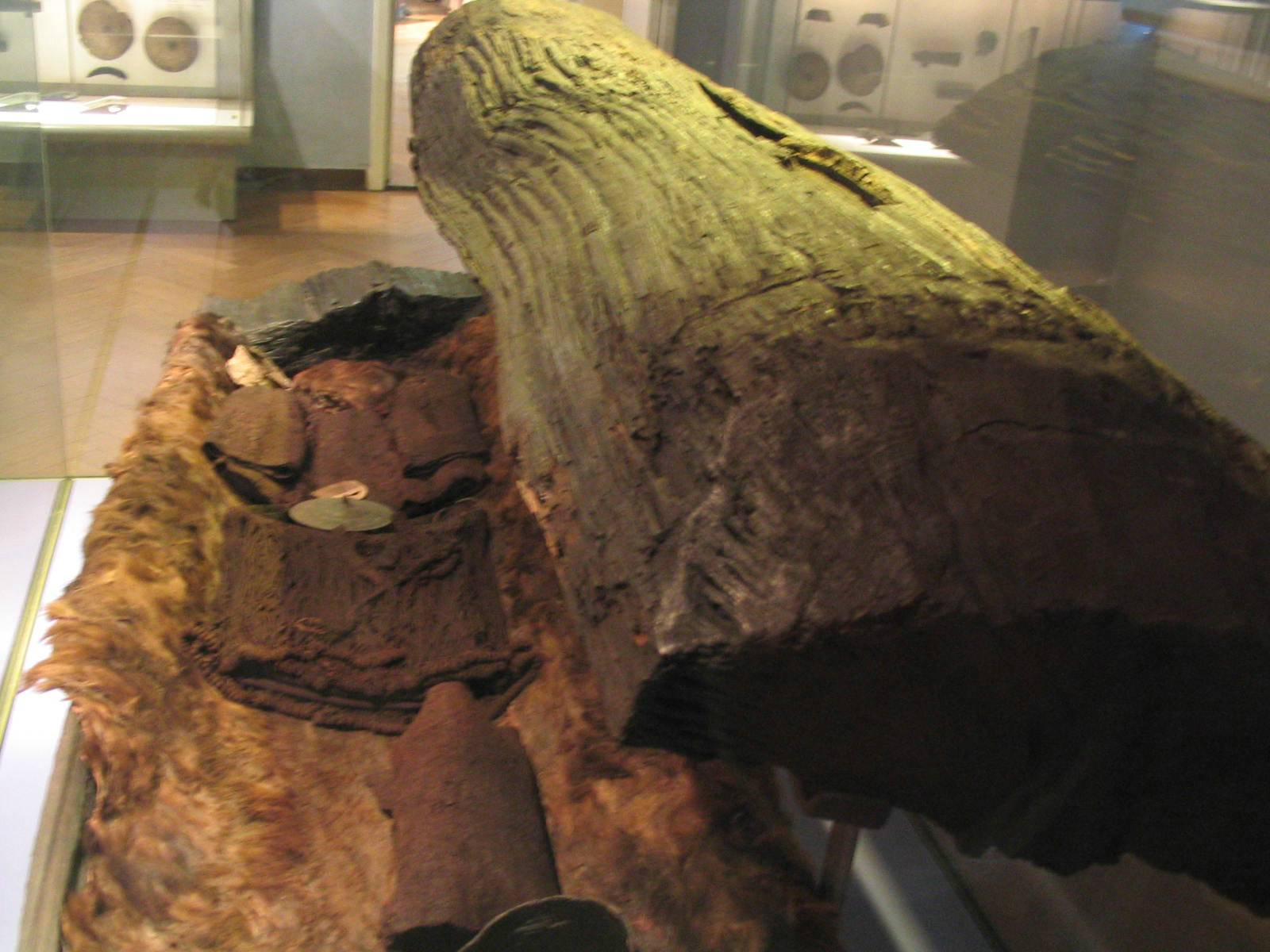
- The Egtved Girl's oak-log coffin and its contents at the National Museum of Denmark
- Born: Unknown; Disputed
- Died: c. 1370 BCE (aged approximately 16–18); Unknown
- Body discovered: 24 February 1921; Egtved, Jutland, Denmark
- Resting place: National Museum of Denmark, Copenhagen, Denmark
- Era: Nordic Bronze Age
- Known for: Bronze Age oak-coffin burial with exceptionally preserved woollen clothing; scientific studies of diet, origins and mobility
- Height: 160 cm (5 ft 3 in)

The Egtved Girl [ˈektveð] was a young woman of the Nordic Bronze Age whose burial was discovered near Egtved in Jutland, Denmark, on 24 February 1921. She was approximately 16–18 years old when she died. Tree-ring dating of her oak-log coffin places the burial in the summer of 1370 BCE.

She was buried beneath the mound Storehøj, dressed in a woollen blouse and corded skirt, with a circular bronze belt plate decorated with spirals. Her coffin also contained jewellery, a horn comb, a bark container holding a fermented drink, and the cremated remains of a child aged about five or six. Although her bones had dissolved, her hair, tooth enamel, fingernails and small amounts of brain tissue and skin survived, together with her clothing and other organic burial materials.

Scientific examination of the surviving remains has provided evidence about her diet and prompted debate over her origins and movements. A 2015 study interpreted strontium isotope measurements as evidence that she came from outside present-day Denmark and travelled considerable distances during her final years. Later research questioned that interpretation, proposing either a local origin or an origin elsewhere in Scandinavia. Her remains and the objects from her burial are held at the National Museum of Denmark in Copenhagen.

== Discovery ==
The individual who became known as the Egtved Girl was discovered on 24 February 1921 during the excavation of a Bronze Age burial mound near Egtved in Jutland, Denmark.

The burial mound measured approximately 30 metres (98 ft) in diameter and 4 metres (13 ft) high. Beneath it, archaeologists uncovered a well-preserved oak-log coffin made from a split oak trunk and aligned east to west.

Rather than opening the coffin at the excavation site, archaeologists transported it intact to the National Museum of Denmark in Copenhagen, where it was carefully examined.

== Condition ==
By the time the Egtved Girl was excavated in 1921, most of her body had decomposed. Her hair, brain, teeth and fingernails survived, together with small traces of skin.

The conditions inside the sealed oak coffin also preserved materials that would normally decay, including her woollen clothing, the ox hides and other objects made from organic materials. The acidic, oxygen-poor environment slowed their decomposition.

== Clothing and grave goods ==
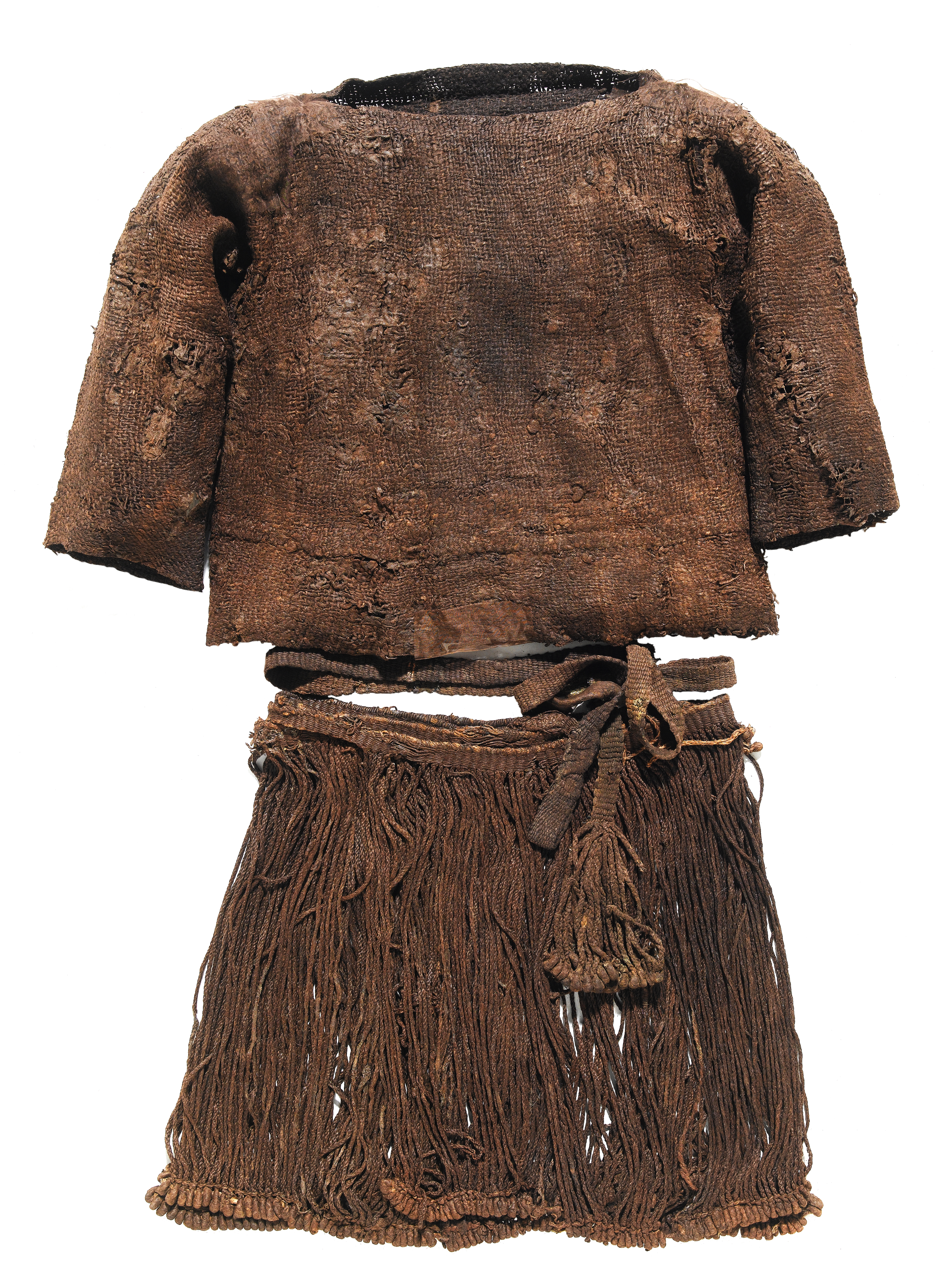
Reconstruction of the Egtved Girl's clothing, including her woollen blouse and corded skirt, at the National Museum of Denmark.

The Egtved Girl was buried wearing a well-preserved woollen outfit. She wore a short blouse with sleeves reaching to about her elbows and a corded wool skirt. The skirt was 38 cm (15 in) long, reached to her knees and was wrapped twice around her waist. Around her waist, she wore a woven woollen sash fastened with a large circular bronze belt plate decorated with spiral patterns and a projecting point at its centre. She also wore a bronze bracelet on each arm and a small bronze earring. Her feet were wrapped in pieces of woven woollen cloth and covered with leather shoes.

Beside her head was a lidded birch bark box containing a bronze awl, bronze dress pins and a hair net made from horsehair. Another birch bark container held a fermented drink made from wheat, honey, bog-myrtle and cowberries, together with flowering yarrow.

Other objects in the coffin included a horn comb and additional pieces of woollen textile.

The surviving textiles have also been examined scientifically. In a study published in 2015, microscopic examination of the wool fibres found evidence of extensive selection and processing, which the researchers interpreted as indicating high-quality textiles. The researchers also used strontium isotope analysis to examine wool from her clothing and other textiles in the grave. They concluded that the raw wool used for her clothing came from outside present-day Denmark.

== Deposition ==
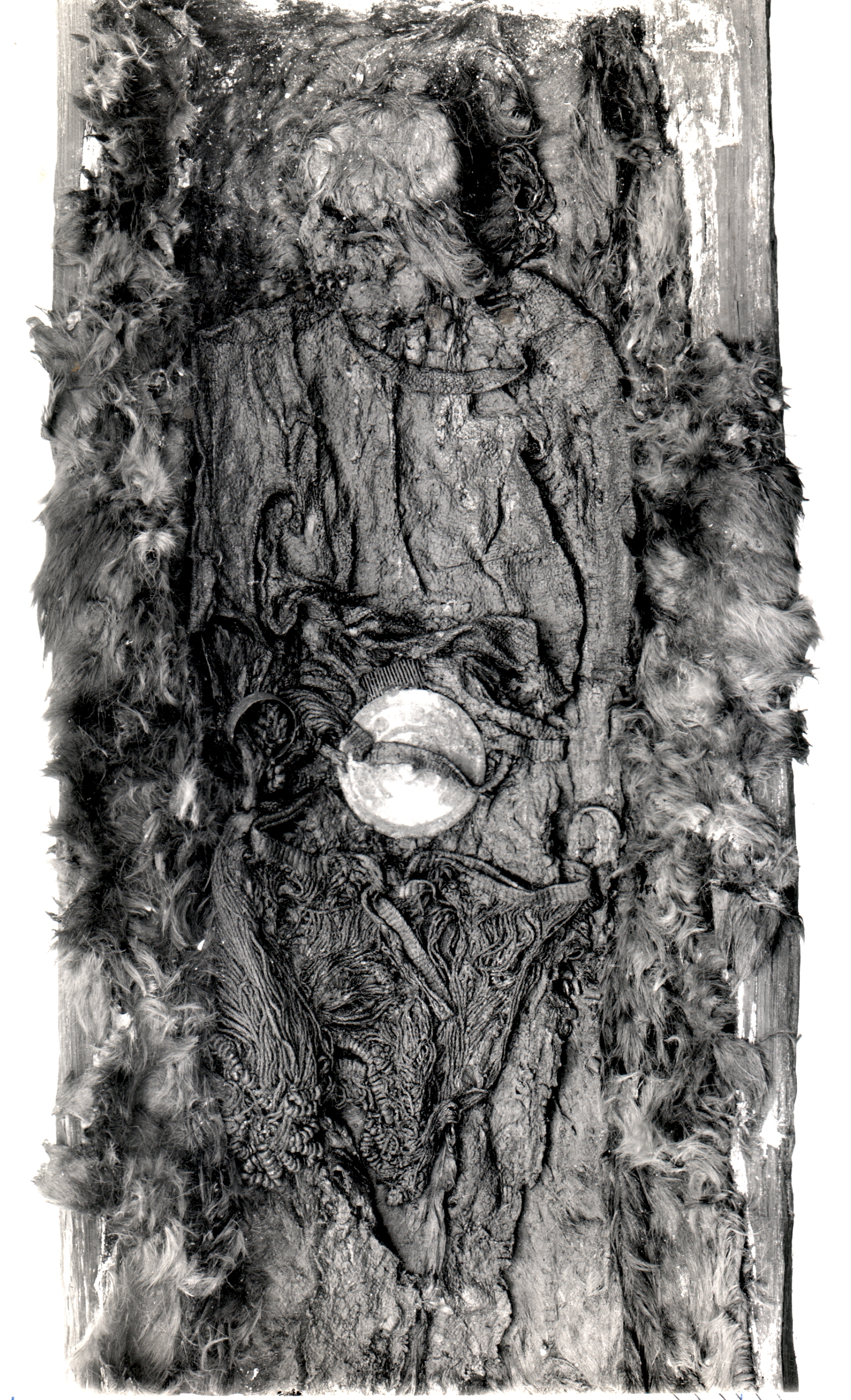
The preserved remains of the Egtved Girl at the National Museum of Denmark

The Egtved Girl was buried in the summer of 1370 BCE, during the Nordic Bronze Age, beneath Storehøj, a burial mound near Egtved, west of Vejle on Denmark's Jutland peninsula. Her grave lay in the eastern part of the mound. The coffin was made from an oak trunk split lengthwise into two halves and hollowed out. One half held the body, while the other formed the lid.

A cattle hide lined the coffin, and she was laid on it with her clothing and the objects buried with her. A woollen blanket was then placed over her before the coffin was closed. A yarrow flower had been laid on the edge of the coffin. Although the hide later decayed, its surviving hairs retained the impression left by her body.

The burial also included the cremated remains of a child aged about five or six. The child's bones were enclosed in a small bundle of clothing, with a few bones from the same child also placed in the bark box beside the young woman's face.

== Scientific analysis ==
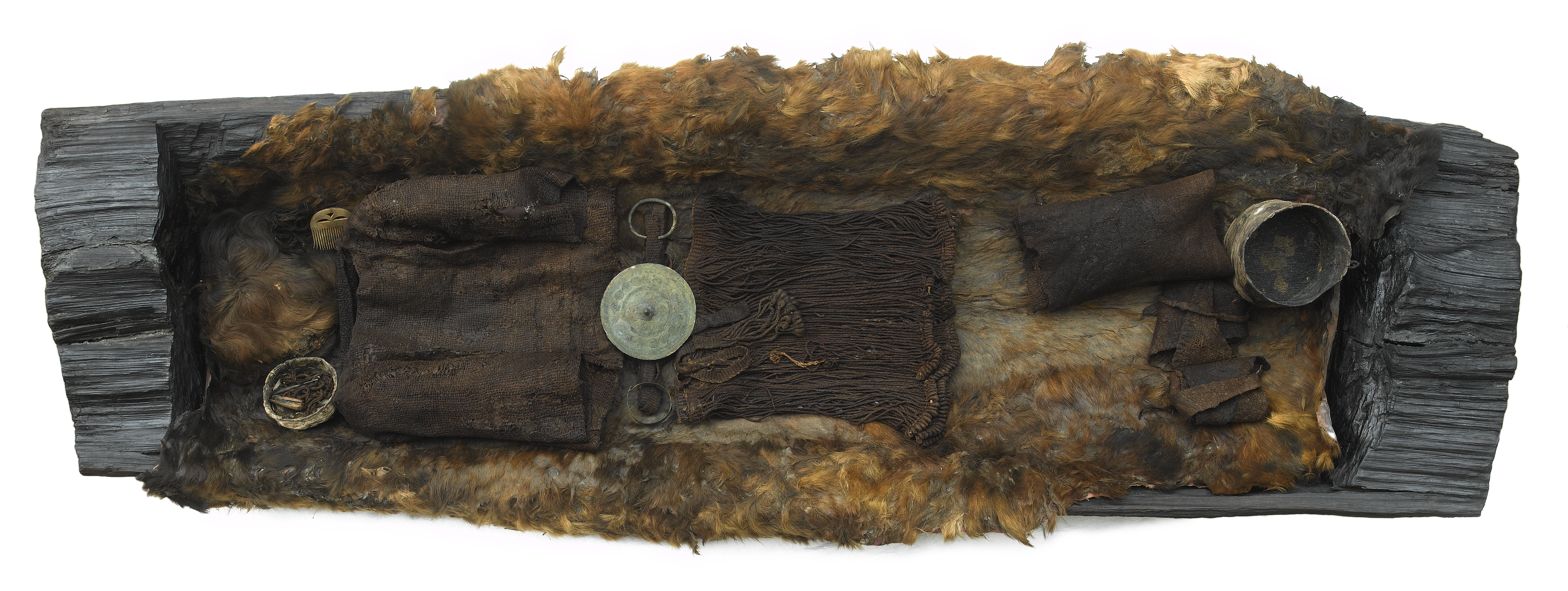
The Egtved Girl's oak coffin and its contents

=== Dating ===
The Egtved Girl's burial is dated to 1370 BCE, during the Nordic Bronze Age, using dendrochronology, or tree-ring dating, of her oak coffin. This method compares the pattern of annual growth rings in wood with a dated sequence of rings. The coffin retained its outermost growth ring beneath the bark, allowing researchers to identify when the tree was cut down.

The final growth ring contained early-season wood and a narrow band of later growth, indicating that the tree was felled in summer. A yarrow flower placed on the edge of the coffin also supports a summer burial, according to the National Museum of Denmark. The museum dates the burial to the summer of 1370 BCE.

=== Body and health ===
Reconstruction of the Egtved Girl's Bronze Age clothing

The individual who became known as the Egtved Girl was a young woman who lived during the later Nordic Bronze Age, around 1390–1370 BCE. She died in her late teens, at approximately 16 to 18 years of age, and stood about 160 centimetres (63 in) tall. She had a slim build, short blond hair and well-trimmed fingernails.

=== Diet ===
In a study published in 2015, archaeological scientist Karin Margarita Frei and her colleagues examined the Egtved Girl's surviving hair for evidence of her diet. They measured carbon and nitrogen isotopes, different forms of these elements whose proportions in hair can reflect the foods consumed while it was growing. A sample about 6 centimetres (2.4 in) long, representing approximately the final four to six months of her life, indicated a diet based on foods from land rather than the sea.

The isotope values varied along the hair. The researchers suggested that this pattern might reflect seasonal changes in her diet, although they noted that changes in the nitrogen values could also have resulted from processes within her body.

A separate microscopic examination revealed distinctly narrowed sections along several individual hairs. The researchers suggested that these constrictions might reflect periods of reduced protein availability while the hairs were growing.

=== Origin ===
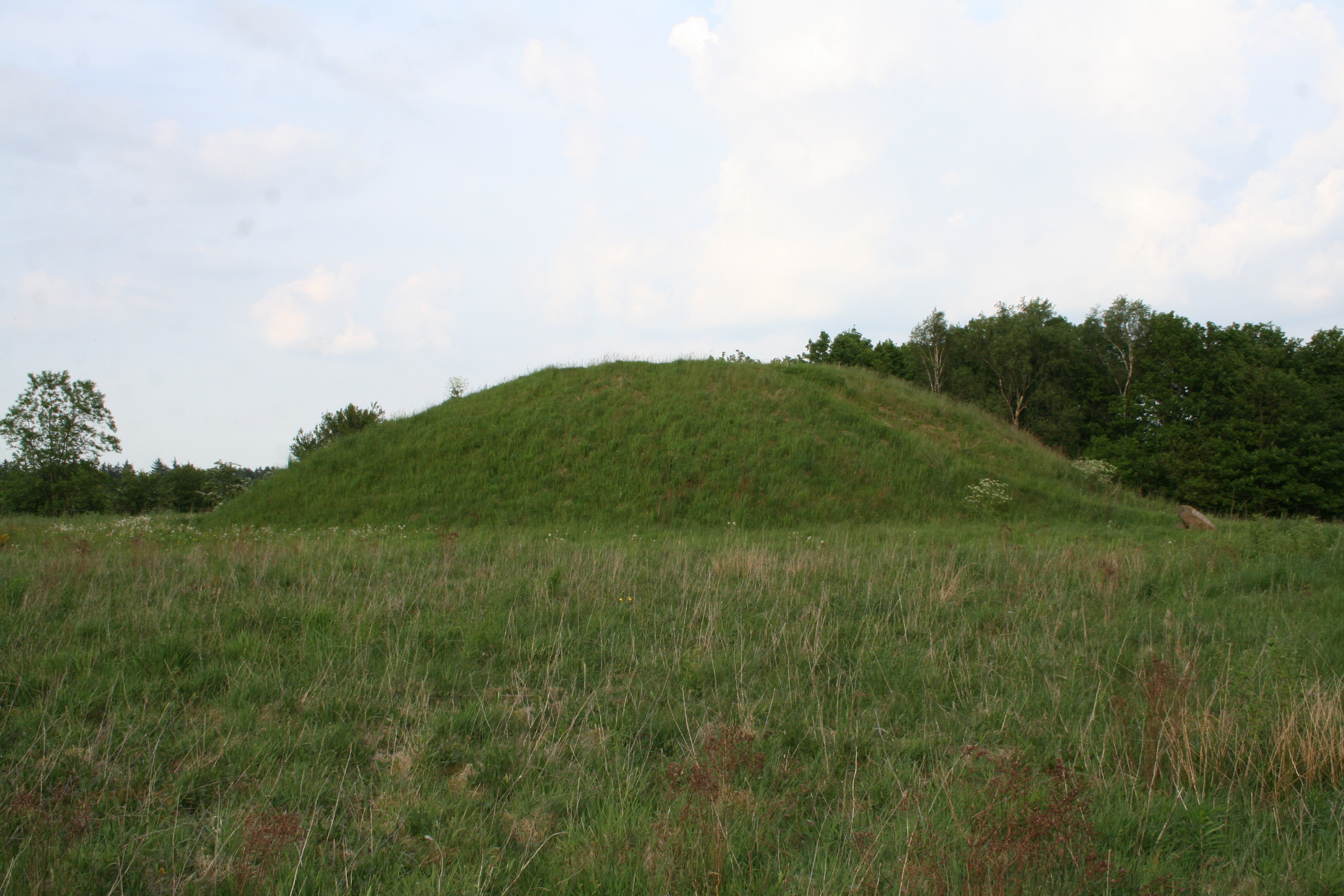
The Egtved Girl's burial mound at Egtved

Initial work by Frei et al in 2015, since contradicted, examined chemical isotopes of strontium from the Egtved Girl's teeth, fingernails, hair, and clothing, and based on these, proposed that she had likely come from the Black Forest region of Germany, but married and moved to Denmark, subsequently traveling back and forth between the two areas. However, Thomsen and Andreasen demonstrated in 2019 that the strontium isotopic data obtained from the area surrounding the grave and used by Frei et al for comparison against the remains had been contaminated by additional strontium contained in the agricultural lime used in modern farming in the Egtved area.

When Thomsen and Andreasen analyzed samples locally from places uncontaminated by modern farming, they found that the range of strontium isotopic values in the surrounding natural environment matched those in the girl. Thus, it is most plausible that she originated from and spent her entire life in the Egtved area, and did not come from far away as proposed by Frei et al. Thomsen and Andreasen's results show that the girl did live about half the year in one area – likely the river valley in Egtved – and the other half of the year in another place – likely the local plateau, perhaps in the practice of transhumance farming and seasonal pastoral movement within a small area.

In a 2019 article based on strontium isotope analysis, Sophie Bergerbrant suggests an origin of Sweden or Norway for the Egtved Girl.

== Reconstruction ==
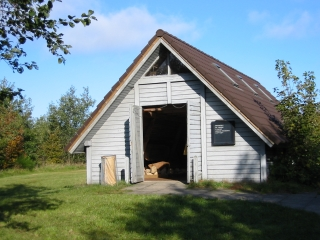
The museum at the site where the Egtved Girl was discovered

A copy of the Egtved Girl's clothing was made at the Lejre Experimental Centre, now Sagnlandet Lejre, for the National Museum of Denmark. The reconstructed blouse and cord skirt were based on recent scientific studies of the original textiles.

The reconstruction is displayed at the National Museum alongside the original clothing and other objects from her burial.

A small museum at the place where the Egtved Girl was discovered also displays copies of her clothing, jewellery and bronze belt plate. The museum stands beside a reconstructed version of her burial mound and includes information about her discovery in 1921.

== See also ==
- Håga mound
- Haraldskær Woman
- Skrydstrup Woman
- The King's Grave
