= Karin Margarita Frei =

Argentinean-Danish archaeological scientist

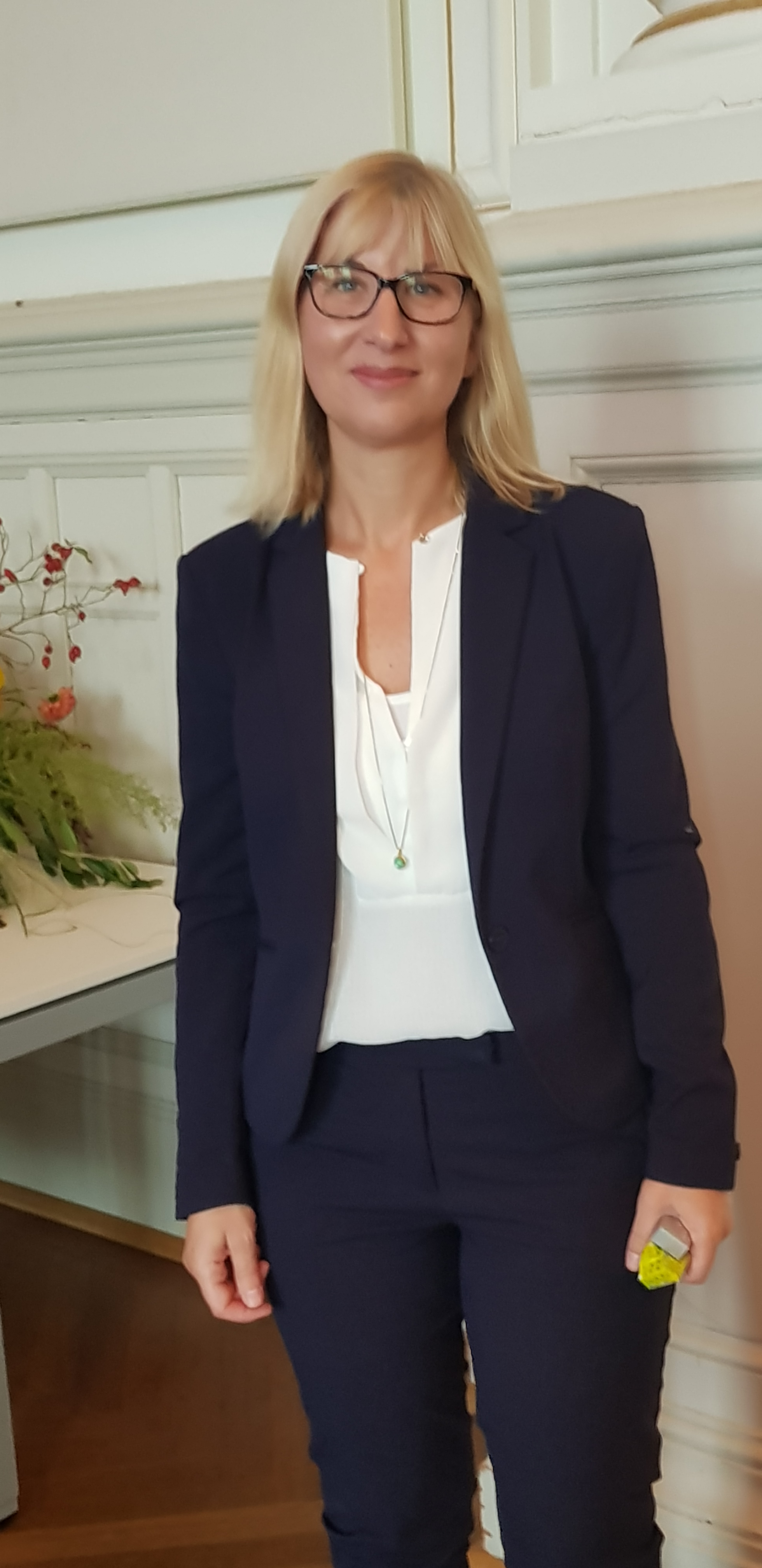
- Born: 1973 (age 52–53)

Academic background
- Education: University of Copenhagen
- Thesis: Provenance of Pre-Roman Iron Age textiles – methods development and applications

Karin Margarita Frei (born 1973) is an Argentinean-Danish archaeological scientist. She is a research professor in archaeometry at the National Museum of Denmark in Copenhagen. She has developed new methodologies for using isotopes to trace human and animal mobility, including the high time-resolution tracing technique for human hair and finger nails as well as ancient wool.

== Education ==
Frei obtained a M.Sc. in 2004 in geology and geochemistry from the University of Copenhagen's Faculty of Science. She was supervised by Minik Rosing. She obtained a PhD in 2010 in archaeometry at the Danish National Research Foundation's Center of Textile Research at the Faculty of Humanities at the University of Copenhagen, under the supervision of Assoc. Professor Henriette Lyngstrøm. In 2011, her thesis Provenance of Pre-Roman Iron Age textiles – methods development and applications was awarded the GMPCA thesis prize for physical and chemical sciences.

== Career ==
After completing her PhD, Frei was employed as a post-doctoral researcher at the Centre for Textile Research. From 2013, she was a project partner in the ERC-funded project The Rise led by Kristian Kristiansen. In 2011, Frei received the "For Women in Science Fellowship Award", awarded by L'Oréal Denmark, UNESCO and The Royal Danish Academy of Sciences and Letters. In 2014, she became a senior researcher at the National Museum of Denmark, and she was appointed a professor in archaeometry at the museum in 2016. She is the first woman to be appointed a professor by the National Museum and the first female professor of archaeometry in Denmark.

Recent work has investigated the mobility of Bronze Age women from Oak Coffin burials at Egtved and Skydstrup in Denmark and changing patterns of mobility over the course of the Southern Scandinavian Neolithic and Bronze Age. She has also worked on other regions and periods, including Viking migrants to Iceland and the deceased warriors from the Bronze Age battlefield at Tollense. In 2017, her research into the Skydstrup woman was recognised with a Shanghai Archaeology Forum research award. Frei was also awarded the Dansk Magisterforening's research award in 2017.

Frei is a life member of the Royal Danish Academy of Sciences and Letters.

Frei's 2018 popular book Egtvedpigens rejse was a Danish best seller. It compares the journeys of the Bronze Age Egtved Girl with Frei's own travels from Argentina to Spain to Denmark.

== Selected publications ==
=== Books ===
- Egtvedpigens rejse. Copenhagen: Lindhardt og Ringhof. ISBN 9788711692042

=== Journal articles ===
- Frei, K.M., Bergerbrant, S., Sjögren, K.-G., Jørkov, M.L., Lynnerup, N., Harvig, L., Allentoft, M.E., Sikora, M., Price, T.D., Frei, R. & Kristiansen, K. 2019. Mapping human mobility during the third and second millennia BC in present-day Denmark. PLOS ONE 14 (8):e0219850.
- Frei, K.M., Coutu, A.N., Smiarowski, K., Harrison, R., Madsen, C.K., Arneborg, J., Frei, R., Guðmundsson, G., Sindbæk, S.M., Woollett, J., Hartman, S., Hicks, M. & McGovern, T.H. 2015. Was it for walrus? Viking Age settlement and medieval walrus ivory trade in Iceland and Greenland. World Archaeology 47 (3):439-66.
- Frei, K.M. & Frei, R. 2011. The geographic distribution of strontium isotopes in Danish surface waters – A base for provenance studies in archaeology, hydrology and agriculture. Applied Geochemistry 26 (3):326-40.
- Frei, K.M., Mannering, U., Kristiansen, K., Allentoft, M.E., Wilson, A.S., Skals, I., Tridico, S., Louise Nosch, M., Willerslev, E., Clarke, L. & Frei, R. 2015. Tracing the dynamic life story of a Bronze Age Female. Scientific Reports 5:10431.
- Frei, K.M., Mannering, U., Vanden Berghe, I. & Kristiansen, K. 2017. Bronze Age wool: provenance and dye investigations of Danish textiles. Antiquity 91 (357):640-54.
- Frei, K.M. & Price, T.D. 2012. Strontium isotopes and human mobility in prehistoric Denmark. Archaeological and Anthropological Sciences 4 (2):103-14.
- Frei, K.M., Skals, I., Gleba, M. & Lyngstrøm, H. 2009. The Huldremose Iron Age textiles, Denmark: an attempt to define their provenance applying the strontium isotope system. Journal of Archaeological Science 36 (9):1965-71.
- Frei, K.M., Villa, C., Jørkov, M.L., Allentoft, M.E., Kaul, F., Ethelberg, P., Reiter, S.S., Wilson, A.S., Taube, M., Olsen, J., Lynnerup, N., Willerslev, E., Kristiansen, K. & Frei, R. 2017. A matter of months: High precision migration chronology of a Bronze Age female. PLOS ONE 12 (6):doi:10.1371/journal.pone.0178834.
- Kristiansen, K., Allentoft, M.E., Frei, K.M., Iversen, R., Johannsen, N.N., Kroonen, G., Pospieszny, Ł., Price, T.D., Rasmussen, S., Sjögren, K.-G., Sikora, M. & Willerslev, E. 2017. Re-theorising mobility and the formation of culture and language among the Corded Ware Culture in Europe. Antiquity 91 (356):334-47.
- Smith, M.H., Smith, K.P. & Frei, K.M. 2019. 'Tangled up in Blue': The Death, Dress and Identity of an Early Viking-Age Female Settler from Ketilsstaðir, Iceland. Medieval Archaeology 63 (1):95-127.
- Strand, E.A., Frei, K.M., Gleba, M., Mannering, U., Nosch, M.-L. & Skals, I. 2010. Old Textiles – New Possibilities. European Journal of Archaeology 13 (2):149-73.
