= Hairnet =

Small, often elasticised, fine net worn over hair to keep it contained

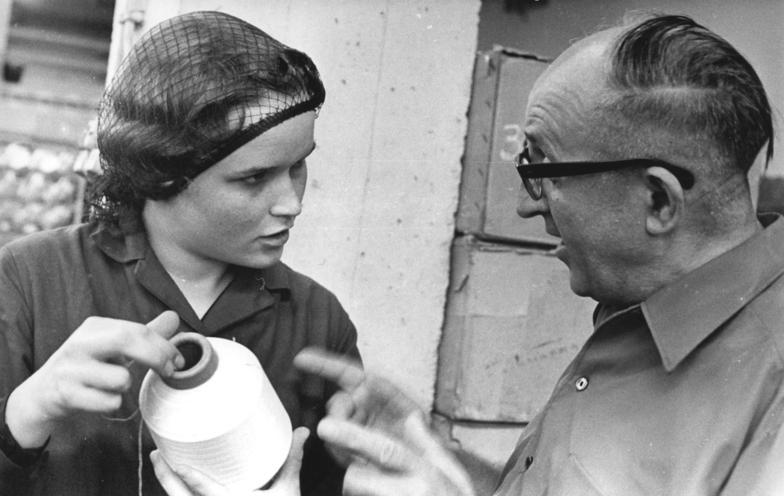
A woman wearing a hair net in a factory

A hairnet, or sometimes simply a net or caul, is a small, often elasticised, fine net worn over long hair to hold it in place. It is worn to keep hair contained. A snood is similar, but a looser fit, and with a much coarser mesh and noticeably thicker yarn.

== History ==
The oldest evidence of the hair net is from the 3300-year-old grave of a Danish girl dubbed the Egtved Girl; later examples are found in Ancient Greece

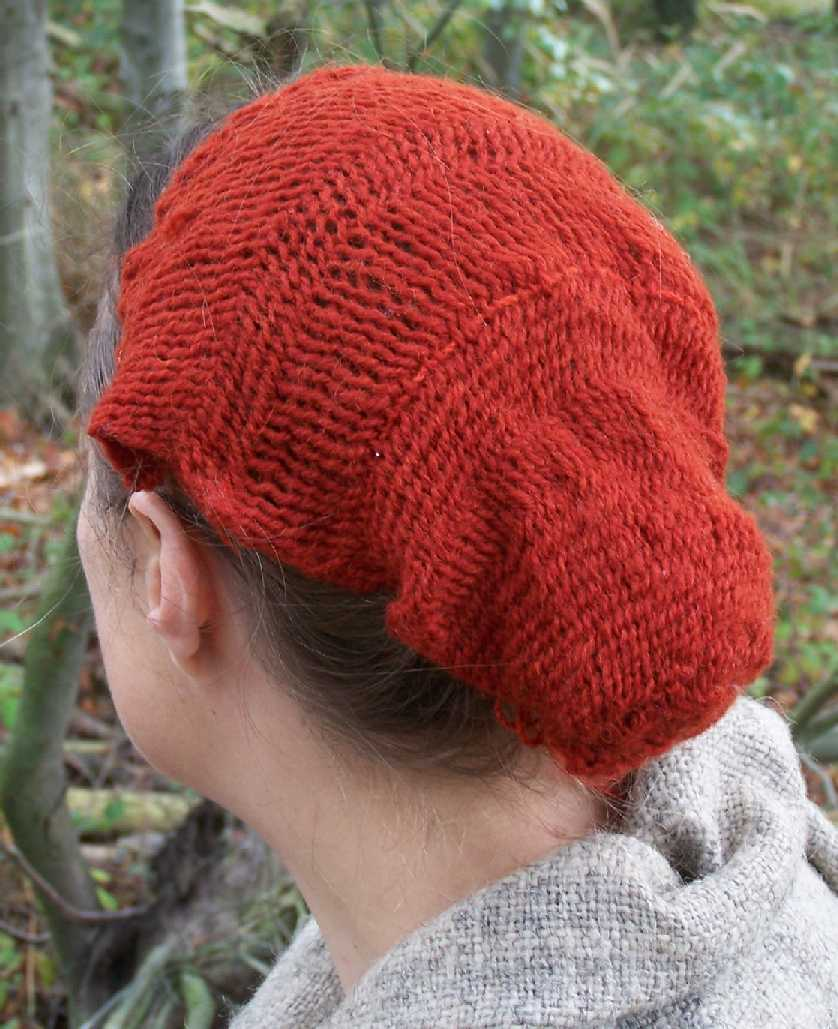
Reconstruction of an Iron Age woman's hair net

Hairnets were worn from the 13th century onwards in Germany and England, and are shown in illustrations from this period, often worn with a wimple. They were made from extremely fine silk, and edged with bands of either finger-weaving or tablet-weaving.

== Uses ==
Food service workers often wear hairnets to prevent their hair from entering the food. Hairnets are part of normal attire for female horse riders, and are worn in most equestrian disciplines, including dressage, eventing, show jumping, and hunting. Organizations such as the Pony Club encourage their young members to become accustomed to wearing hairnets when around horses, not only to ensure a neat and elegant appearance, but also to eliminate any danger of scalping, should the rider fall off and the horse tread on loose hair.

Ballet dancers typically wear a bun at the crown of the head covered in a fine hairnet.

Examples of hairnets

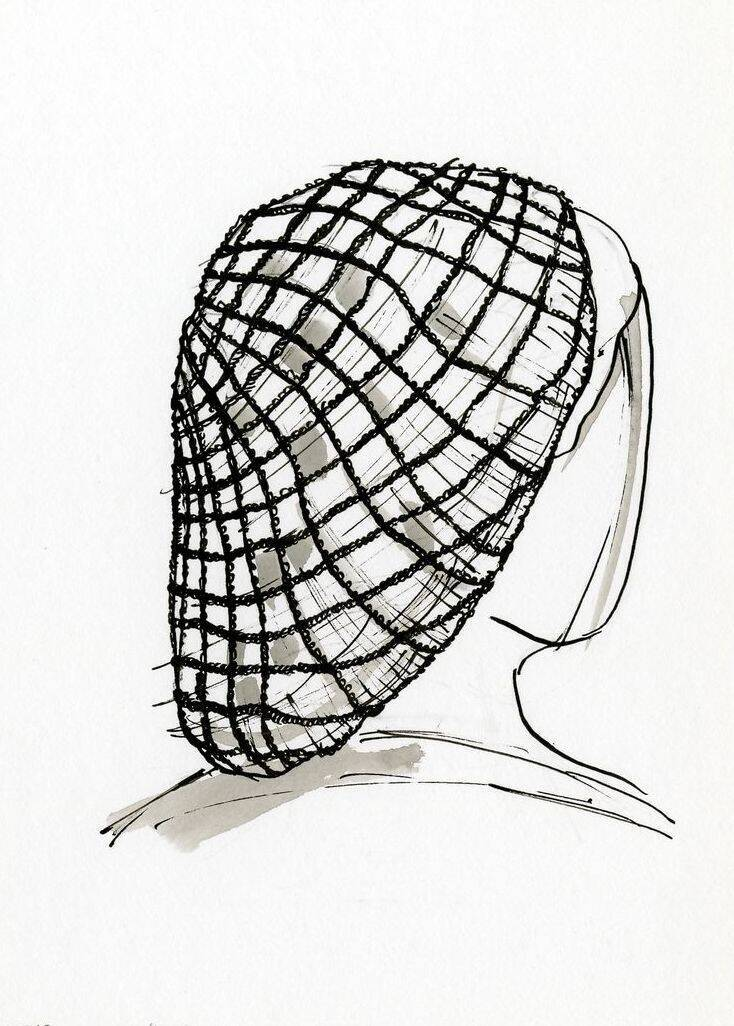
Sketch of a hairnet

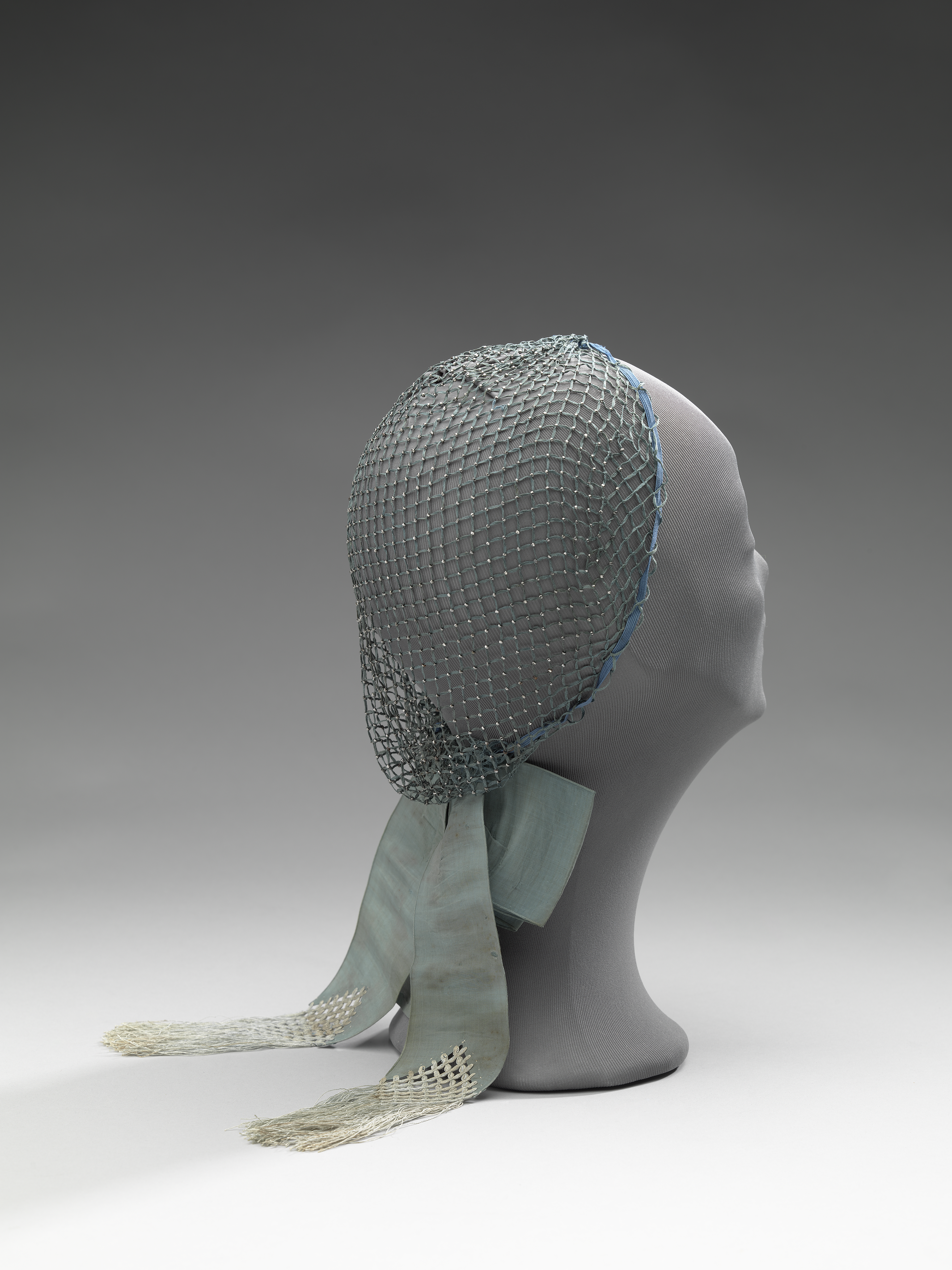
19th-century hairnet

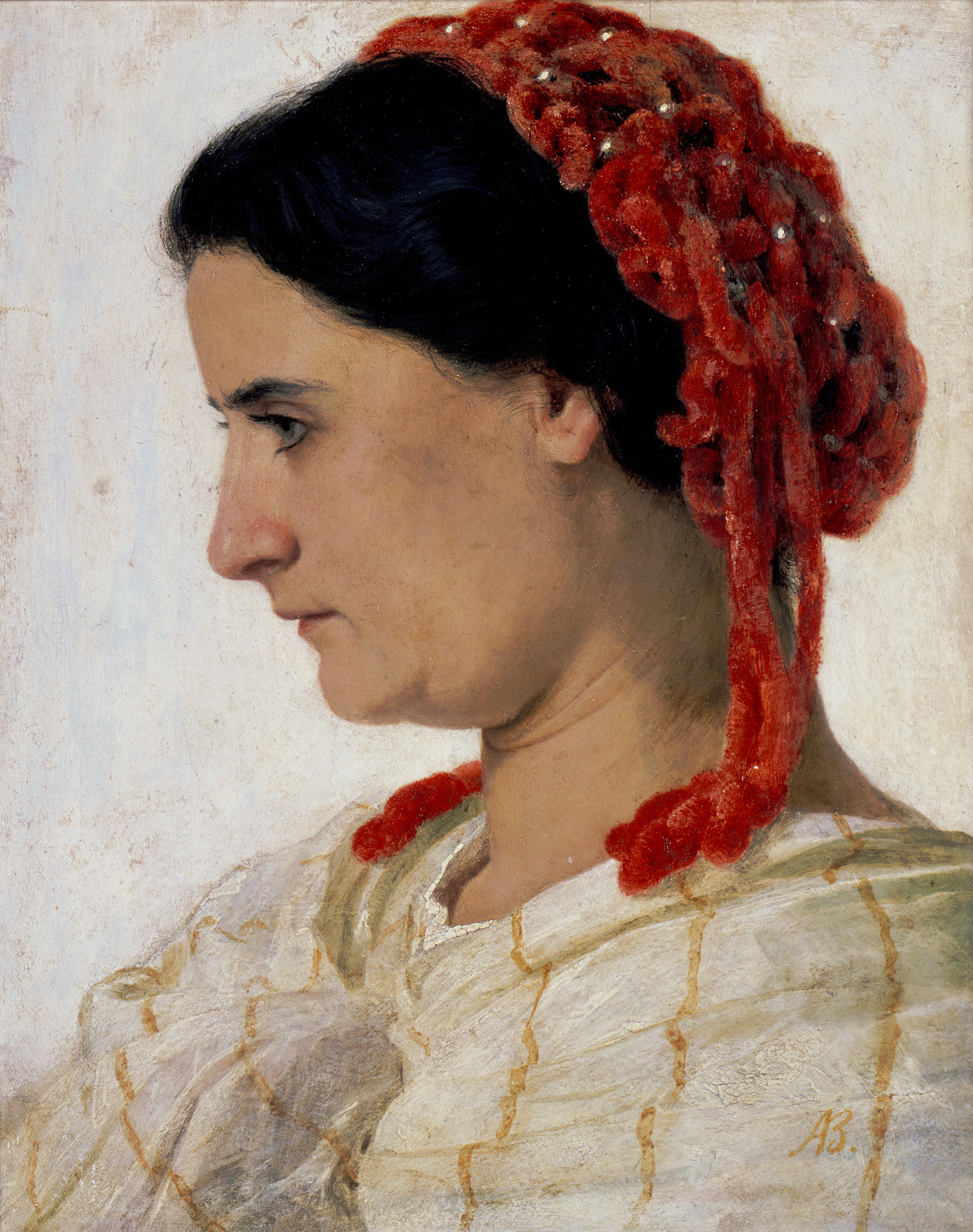
19th-century woman with red hairnet

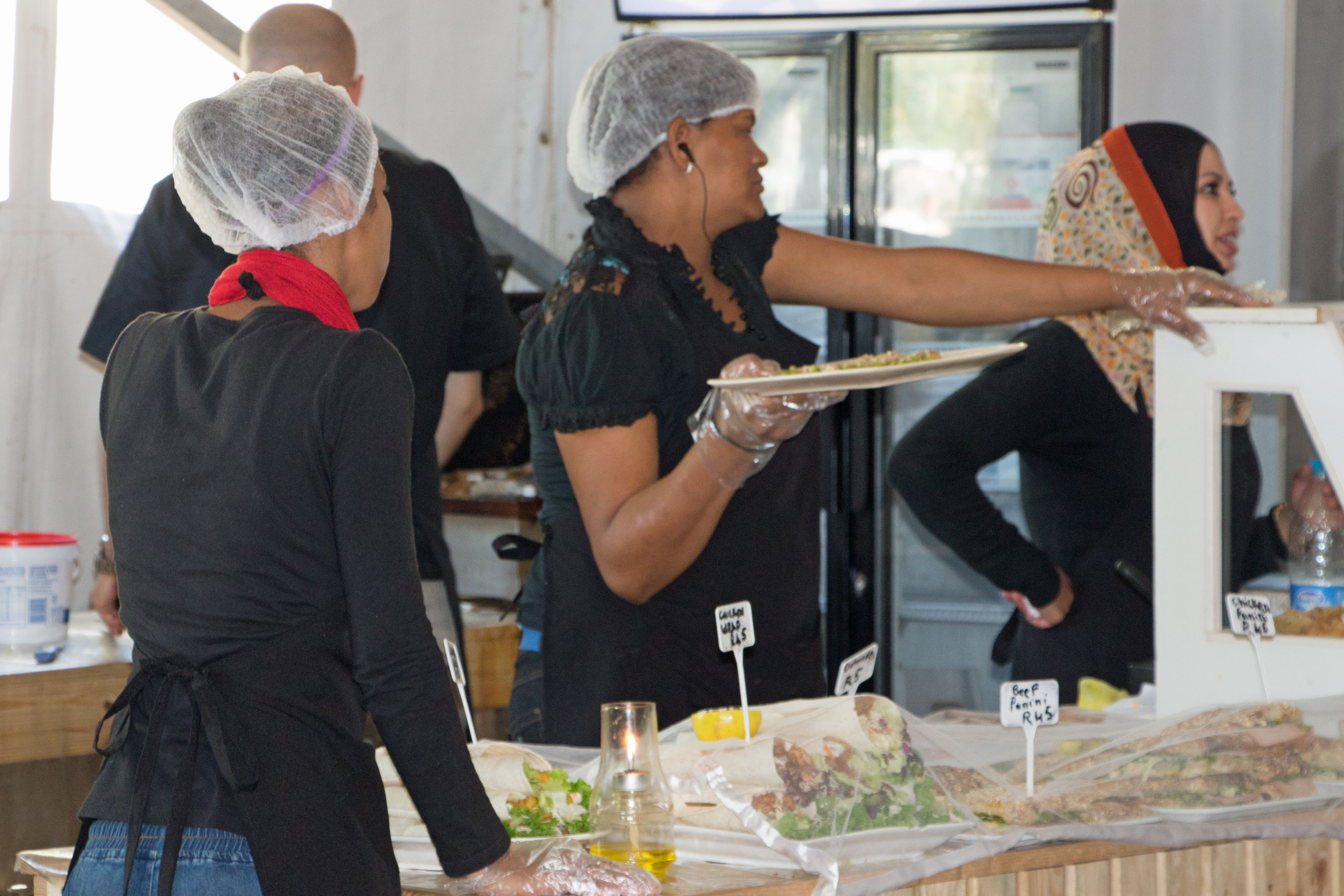
Foodservice hairnet

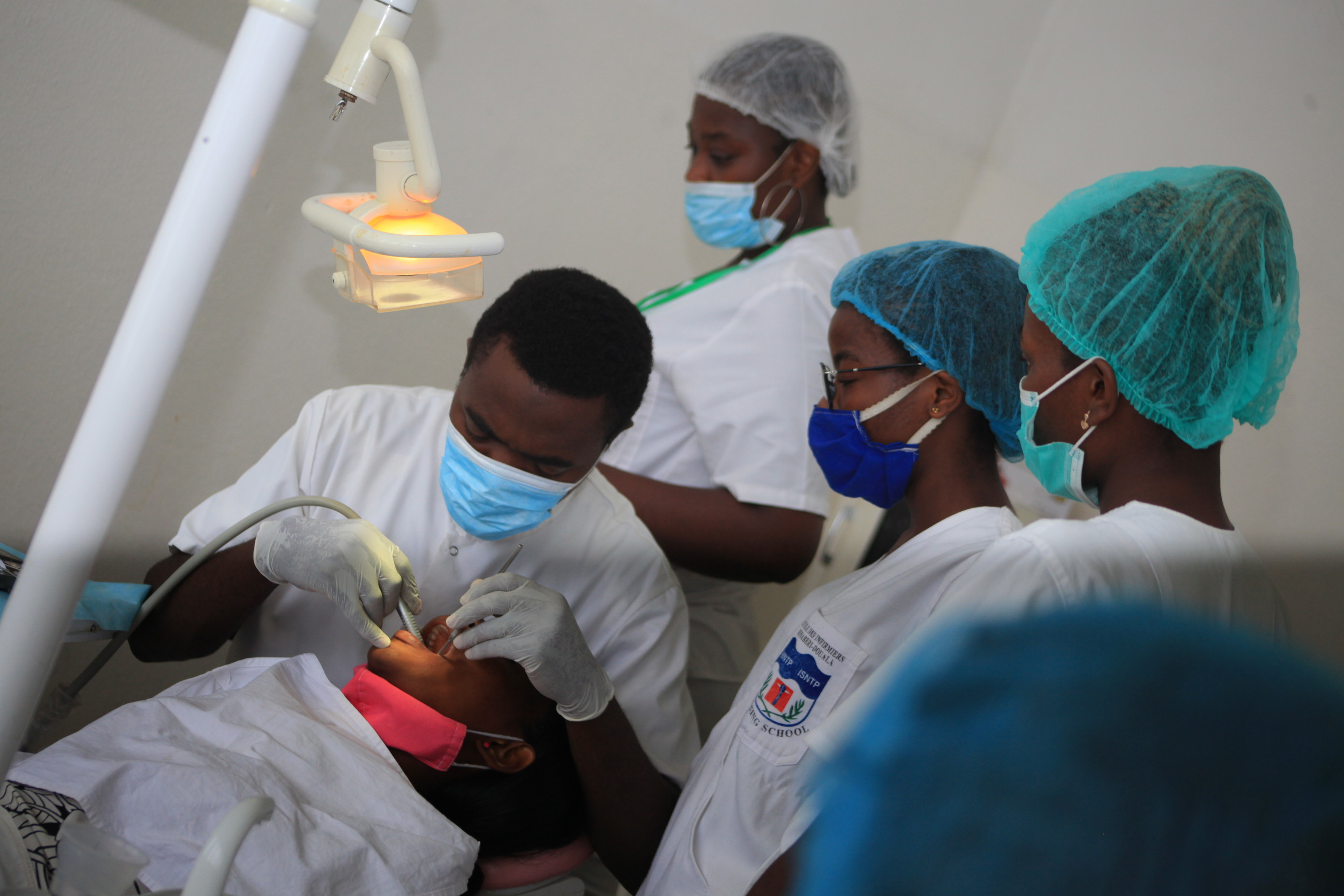
Medical hairnet

== In culture ==
Ena Sharples, a character in the UK soap opera Coronation Street between 1960 and 1980, was famous for wearing a hairnet; the original hairnet was brought in by the character's actress, Violet Carson, to stop the make-up women from altering her hair.

Female gang members in the United States and Mexico may wear hair coverings as part of their uniforms.
