= National Museum of Denmark =

- Nationalmuseet

- The inner courtyard of the Prince's Palace, home to the National Museum of Denmark
- Interactive fullscreen map
- Former name: Det Kongelige Kunstkammer
- Established: 22 May 1807; 219 years ago
- Location: Ny Vestergade 10, Copenhagen, Denmark
- Coordinates: 55°40′29″N 12°34′29″E
- Type: National museum
- Visitors: 351,373 (2017)
- Founder: Christian Jürgensen Thomsen
- Director: Rane Willerslev
- Owner: State of Denmark
- Website: Official Website

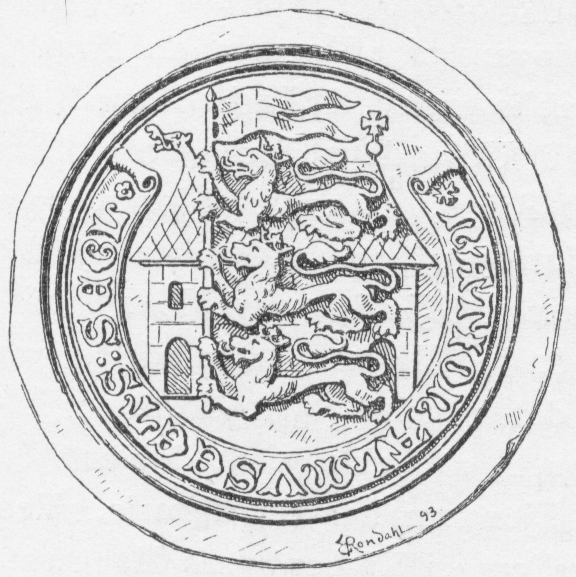
Seal (1893)

Researchers from the National Museum of Denmark are carrying out archaeological excavations at Cape Espenberg, Alaska, to investigate the history and environmental background of ancient Arctic communities.

The National Museum of Denmark (Danish: Nationalmuseet) in Copenhagen is Denmark's largest museum of cultural history, comprising the histories of Danish and foreign cultures, alike. The museum's main building is located a short distance from Strøget at the center of Copenhagen. It contains exhibits from around the world, from Greenland to South America. Additionally, the museum sponsors SILA - The Greenland Research Center at the National Museum of Denmark to further archaeological and anthropological research in Greenland.

The museum has a number of national commitments, particularly within the following key areas: archaeology, ethnology, numismatics, ethnography, natural science, conservation, communication, building antiquarian activities in connection with the churches of Denmark, as well as the handling of the Danefæ (the National Treasures).

== Exhibitions ==
The museum covers 14,000 years of Danish history, from the reindeer-hunters of the Ice Age, Vikings, and works of religious art from the Middle Ages, when the church was highly significant in Danish life. Danish coins from Viking times to the present and coins from ancient Rome and Greece, as well as examples of the coinage and currencies of other cultures, are exhibited also. The National Museum keeps Denmark's largest and most varied collection of objects from the ancient cultures of Greece and Italy, the Near East and Egypt. For example, it holds a collection of objects that were retrieved during the Danish excavation of Tell Shemshara in Iraq in 1957.

The museum houses one of the largest collections of pre-Columbian objects from the Caribbean Islands in Europe with around 7.800 catalogue numbers, where one catalogue number can cover anything from a single green stone axe to hundreds of ceramic sherds, lithic, bone and shell artefacts. Named as the Hatt Collection, after its principal curator the geographer and archaeologist Gudmund Hatt, who curated the Pre-Columbian Collection from the Caribbean Islands between 1919 and 1947.

Exhibits are also shown on who the Danish people are and were, stories of everyday life and special occasions, stories of the Danish state and nation, but most of all stories of different people's lives in Denmark from 1560 to 2000.

The Danish pre-history section was re-opened in May 2008 after years of renovating.

In 2013, a major exhibition on the Vikings was opened by Margrethe II of Denmark. It has toured to other museums, including the British Museum in London.

== Restitution ==
In 2024, the museum repatriated a 17th-century sacred feathered cloak that was taken to Denmark in 1689 from the Tupinambá people of Brazil, where it was placed in the custodianship of the National Museum in Rio de Janeiro.

== Notable artifacts ==
- Holmegaard bow
- Trundholm Sun Chariot
- Egtved Girl coffin
- Hjortspring boat
- Gundestrup cauldron
- Seikilos epitaph
- Golden horns of Gallehus (only copies are on display since the originals were stolen and melted down in 1802)
- Snoldelev Stone
- Tjele helmet fragment
- Kingittorsuaq Runestone

== Directors ==
- Christian Jürgensen Thomsen (1825–1865)
- Jens Jacob Asmussen Worsaae (1856–1874)
- Sophus Müller (1895–1921)
- Olaf Olsen (1981–1995)
- Steen Hvass (1996–2001)
- Carsten U. Larsen (2002–2008)
- Per Kristian Madsen (2008–2017)
- Rane Willerslev (2017–present)

== Gallery ==
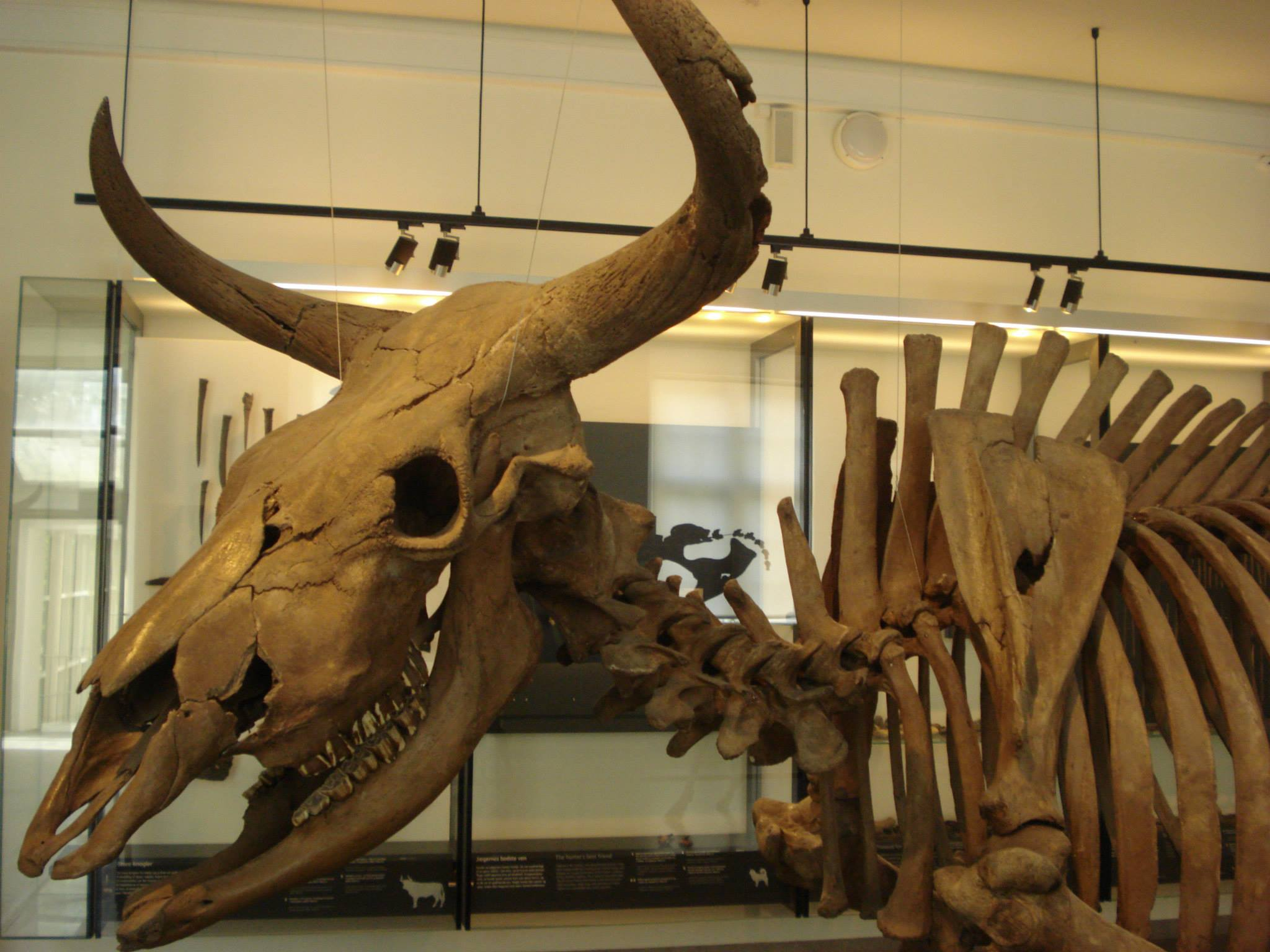
Exhibit of an aurochs skeleton

An Early Bronze Age horned mask with gold application, found at Hagendrup, western Zealand

The Trundholm Sun Chariot, an important Early Nordic Bronze Age artifact

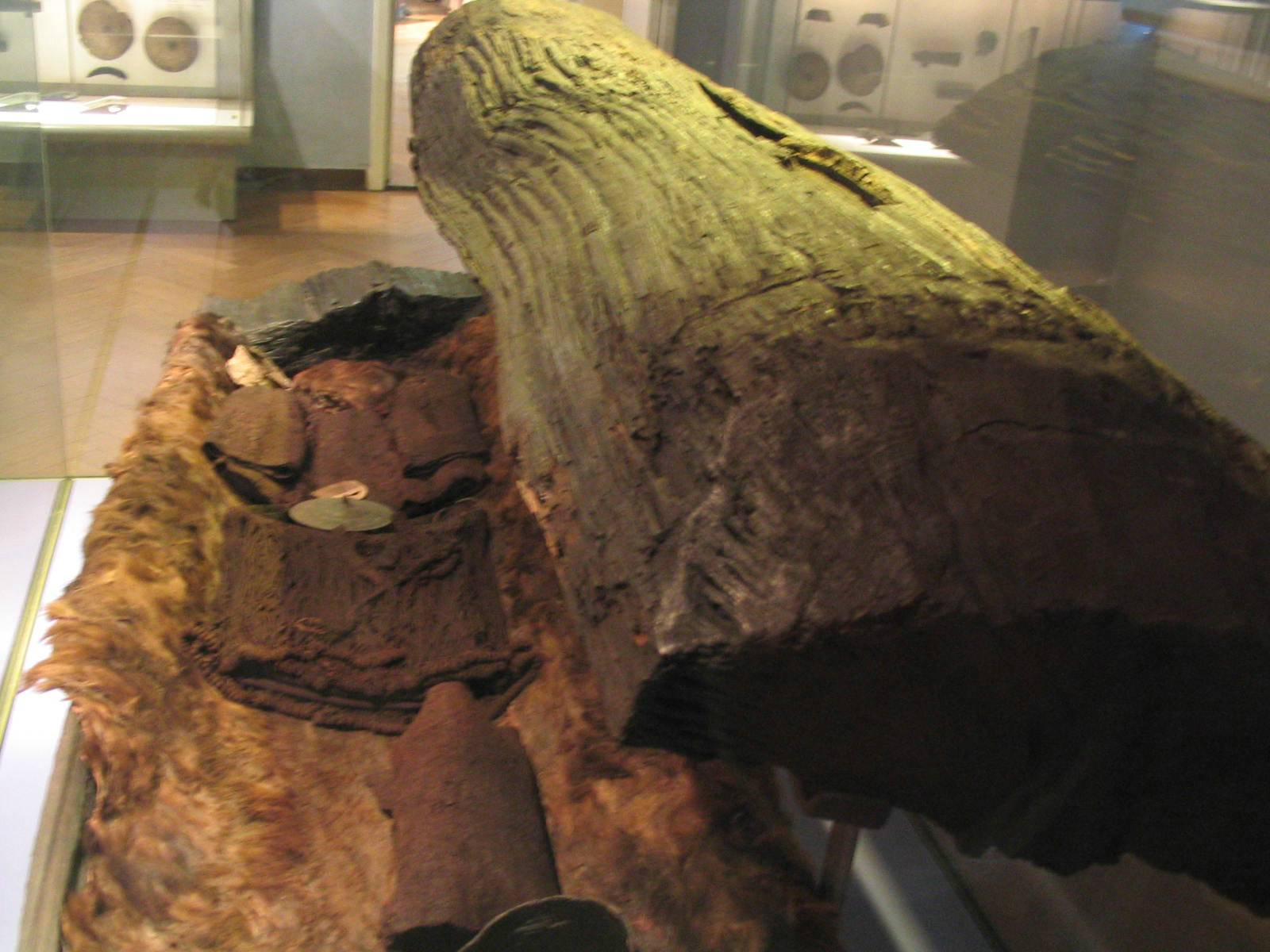
The Egtved Girl oak coffin from the Early Nordic Bronze Age

The Veksø helmets, Bronze Age horned helmets from Brøns Mose at Veksø on Zealand, Denmark

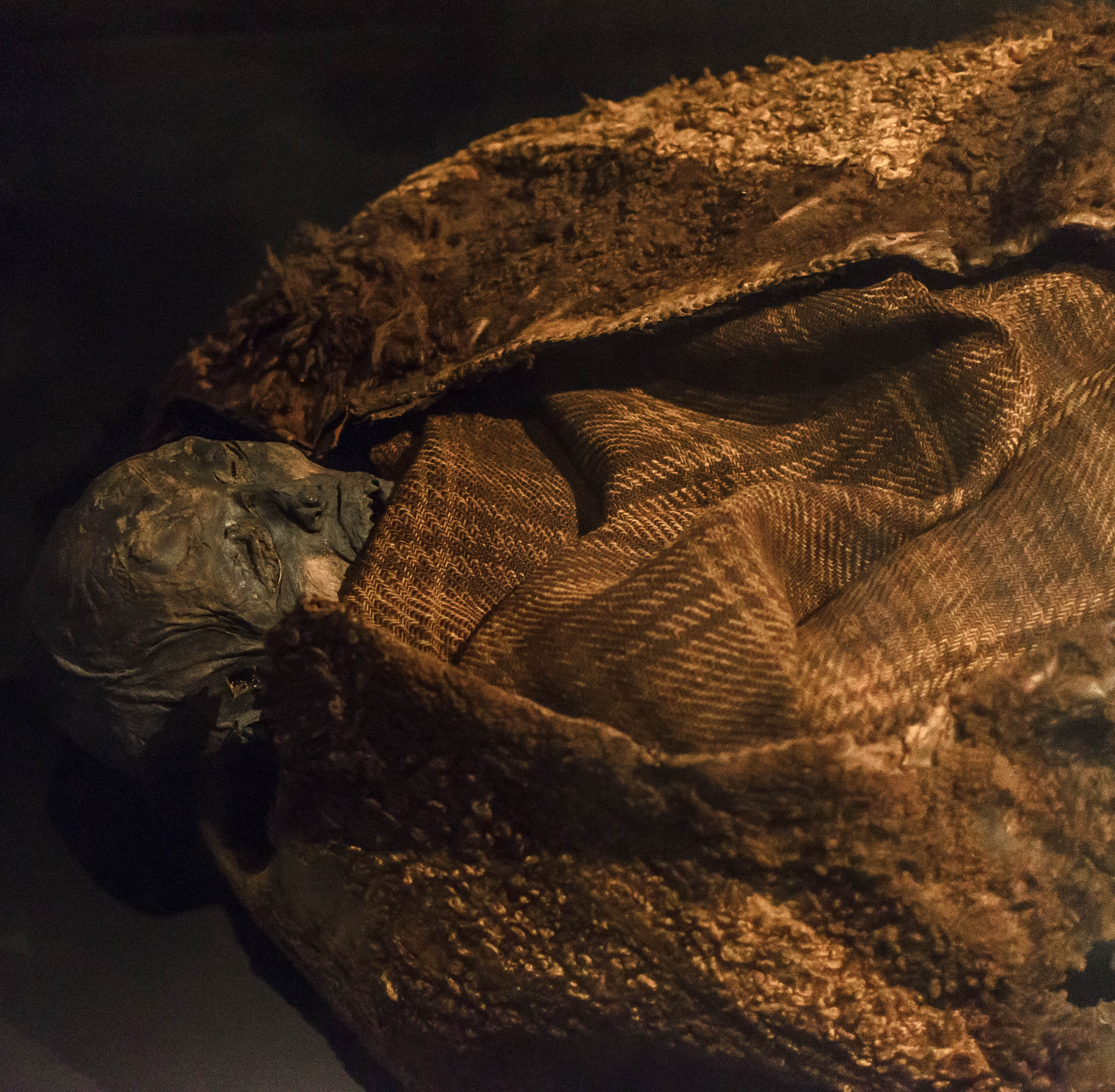
The Huldremose Woman (c. 160 BCE – 340 CE), a bog body found near Ramten, Jutland, Denmark

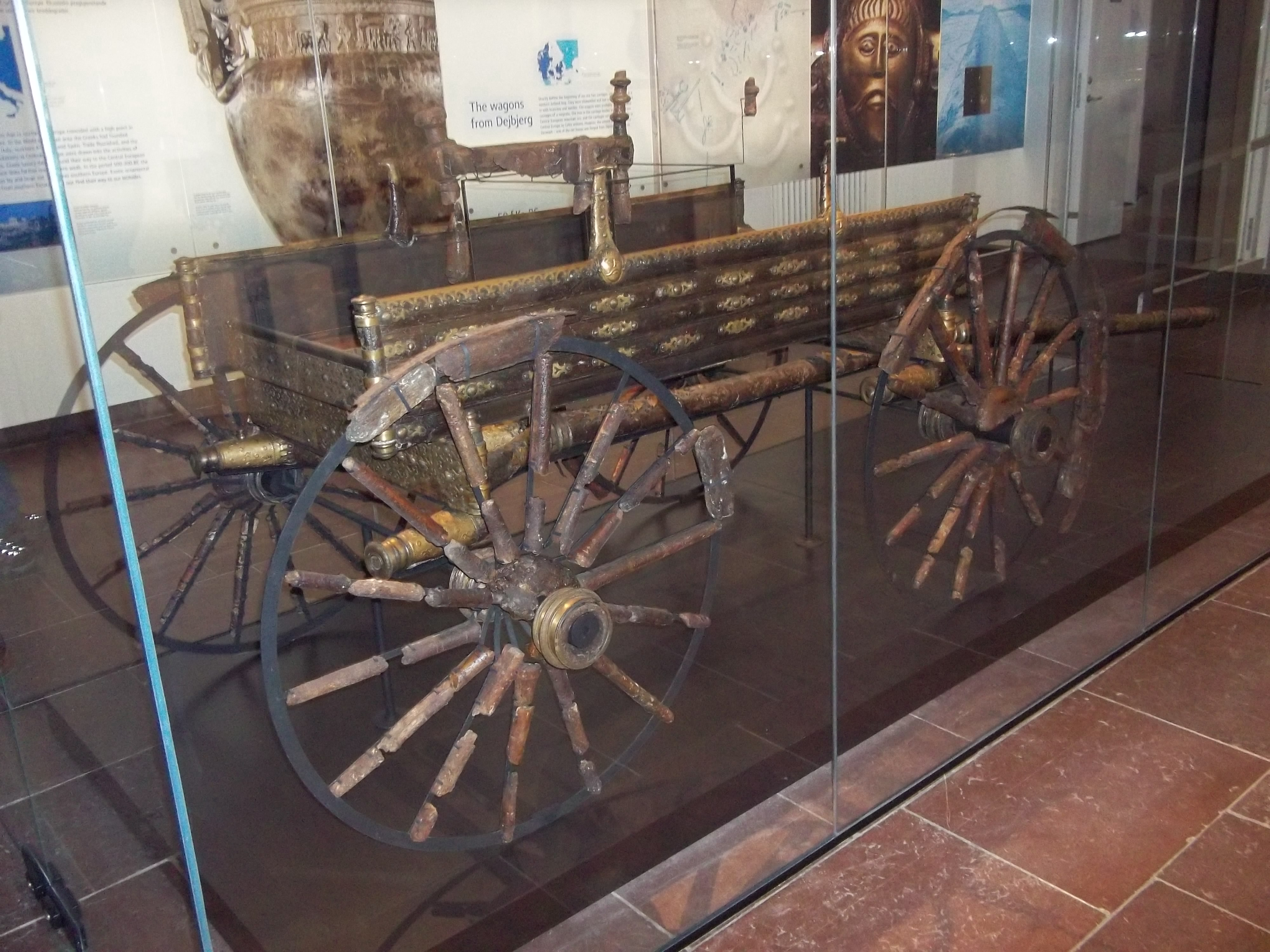
The Dejbjerg wagon (c. 100 BC), a ceremonial wagon from the Pre-Roman Iron Age

Gundestrupkarret (the Gundestrup cauldron), a silver vessel dating from the 1st century BC

Roman silver drinking cups (1st–2nd century AD) from a wealthy couple's burial in Dollerup, Jutland, Denmark

Copies of the two golden horns of Gallehus from around the 4th century

An Iron Age gold neck ring (c. 1st–2nd century AD), officially known as Halsring af guld fra Hellested, discovered at Hellested, Denmark

A bronze plaque depicting a striding horse (c. 600 AD), a Danish Late Germanic Iron Age artifact from a warrior grave at Melsted, Bornholm

An S-shaped metal plaque featuring interlaced animal style motifs (c. 600 AD), from the Melsted warrior grave on Bornholm, Denmark

An Irish gilded dragon head, excavated from a Viking Age burial in Stavanger, Norway

The Roskilde Cross, an antique Byzantine-style gold pectoral reliquary cross dating to c. 1100 AD. Containing sacred relics within, it was discovered in 1806 inside Roskilde Cathedral

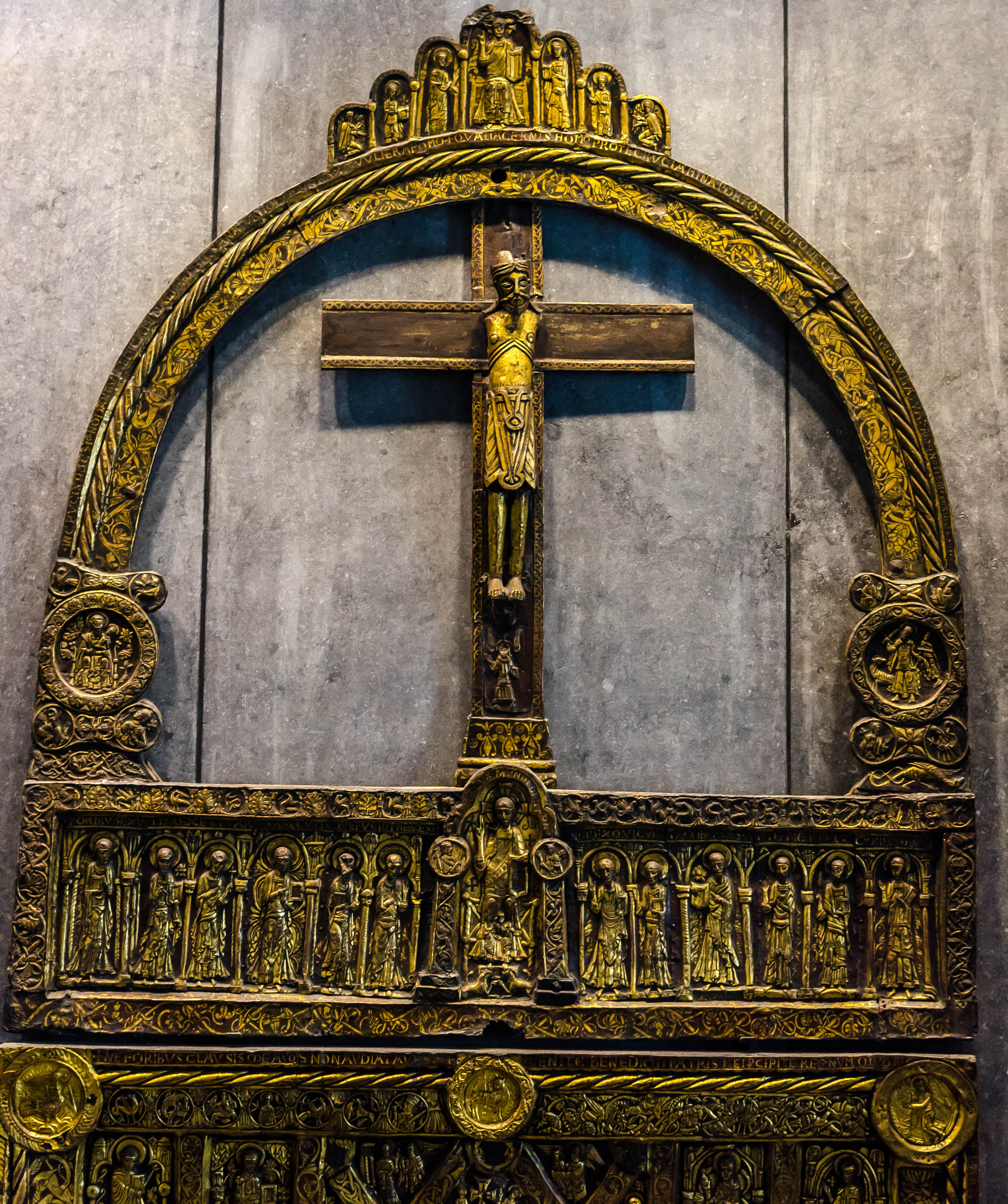
The golden altar of Lisbjerg Church built c. 1125–1150

A Romanesque oak church door with ironwork (c. 1200–1250) from Faaborg, Denmark.

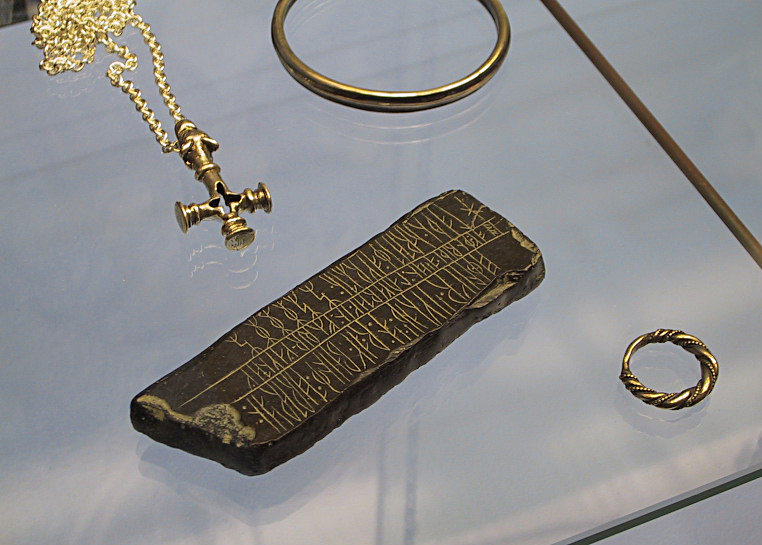
The Kingigtorssuaq Runestone found in Greenland and Old Norse jewelry, including a golden cross

The Vatnås reliquary (Vatnåsskrinet), a 13th-century reliquary casket of likely Norwegian origin

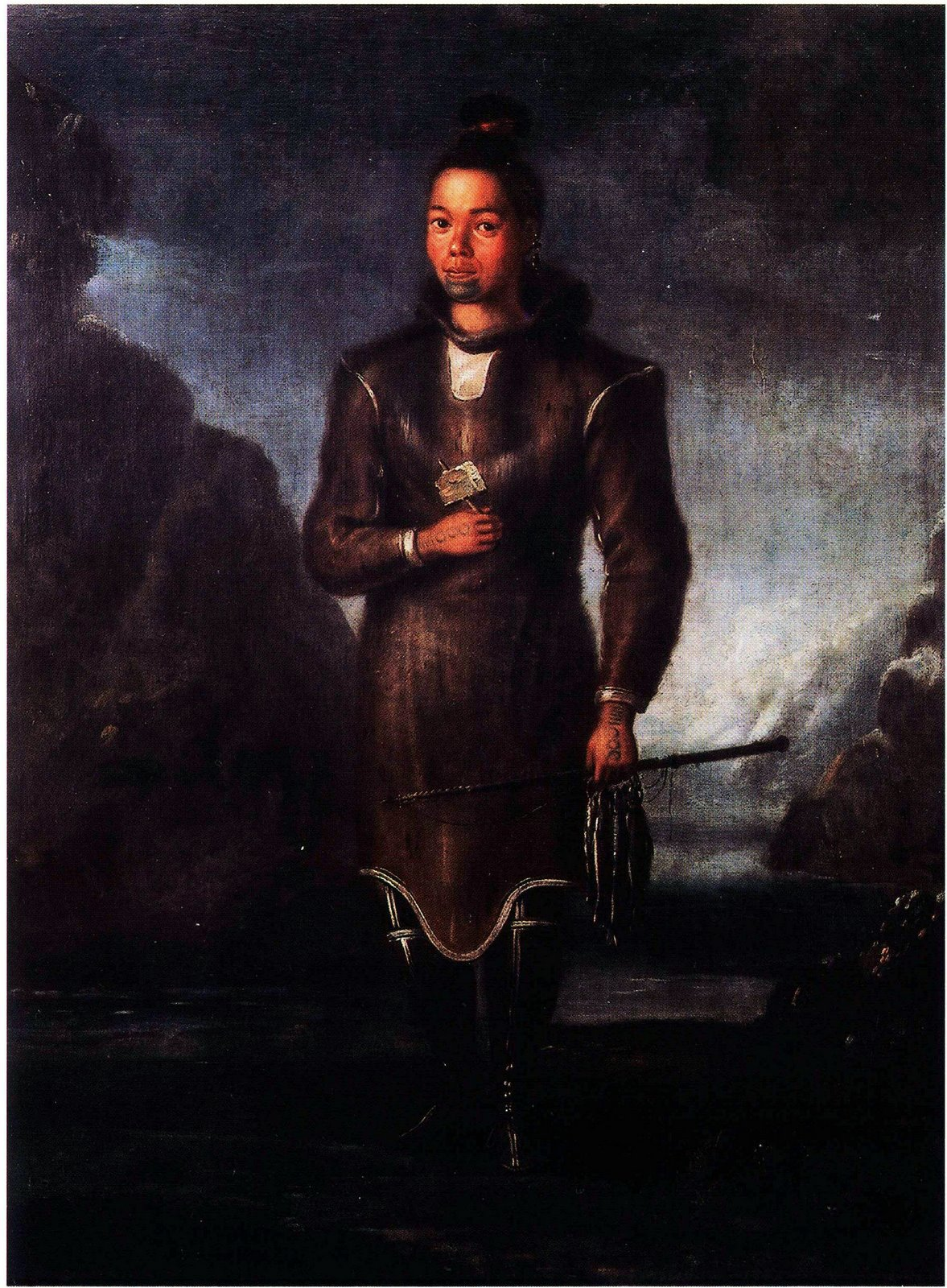
Nivisarsiaq, a painting of a Greenlandic girl who came to Denmark in the mid 18th century

A small wooden carving of Ganesha. The piece originally entered the Royal Danish Kunstkammer (Cabinet of Curiosities) in 1780. The collection was founded around 1650

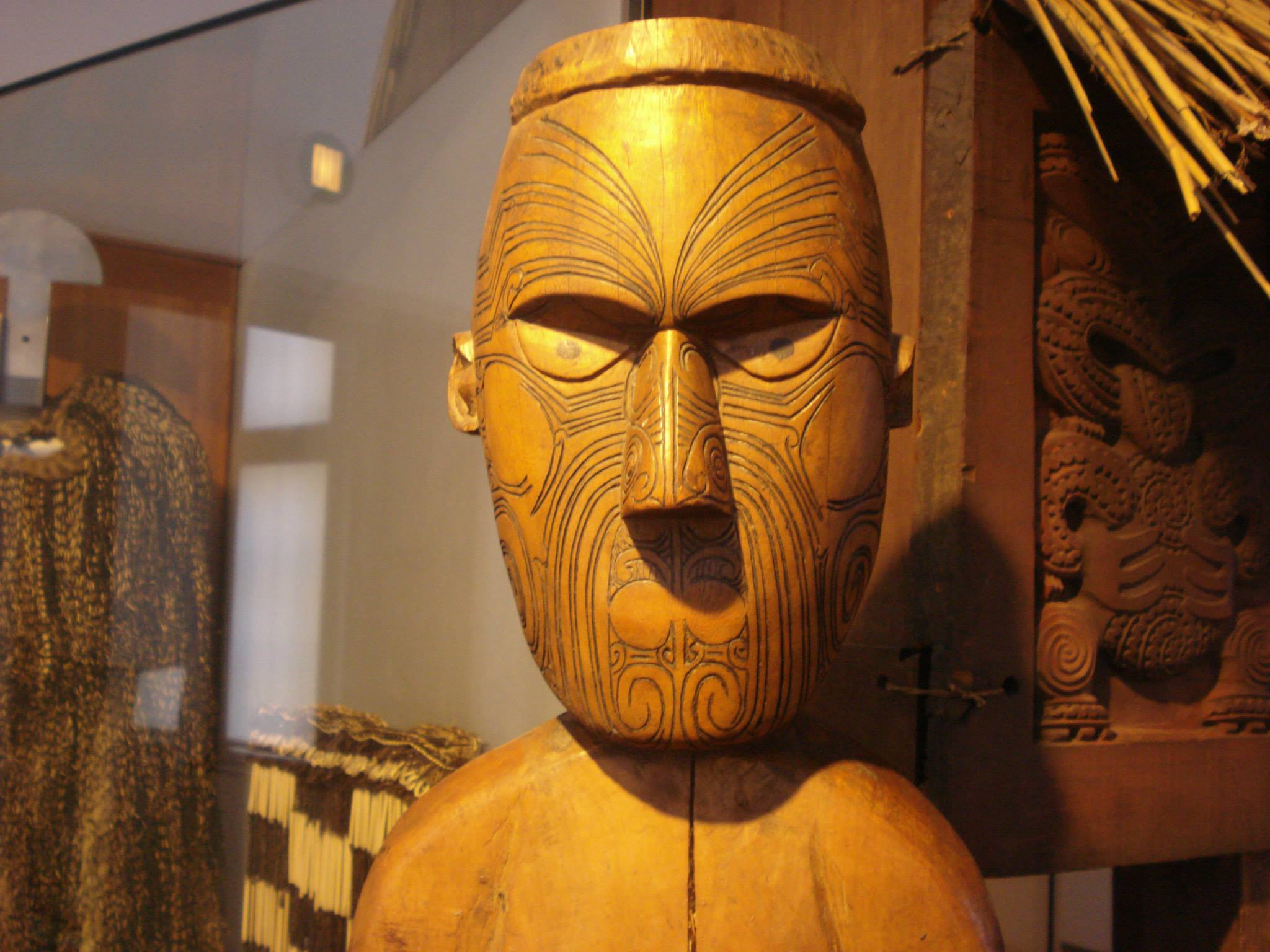
Exhibit from New Zealand. Showcasing sections of global history and traditions

An antique Thai carved and gilded wooden manuscript cabinet from the Rattanakosin period

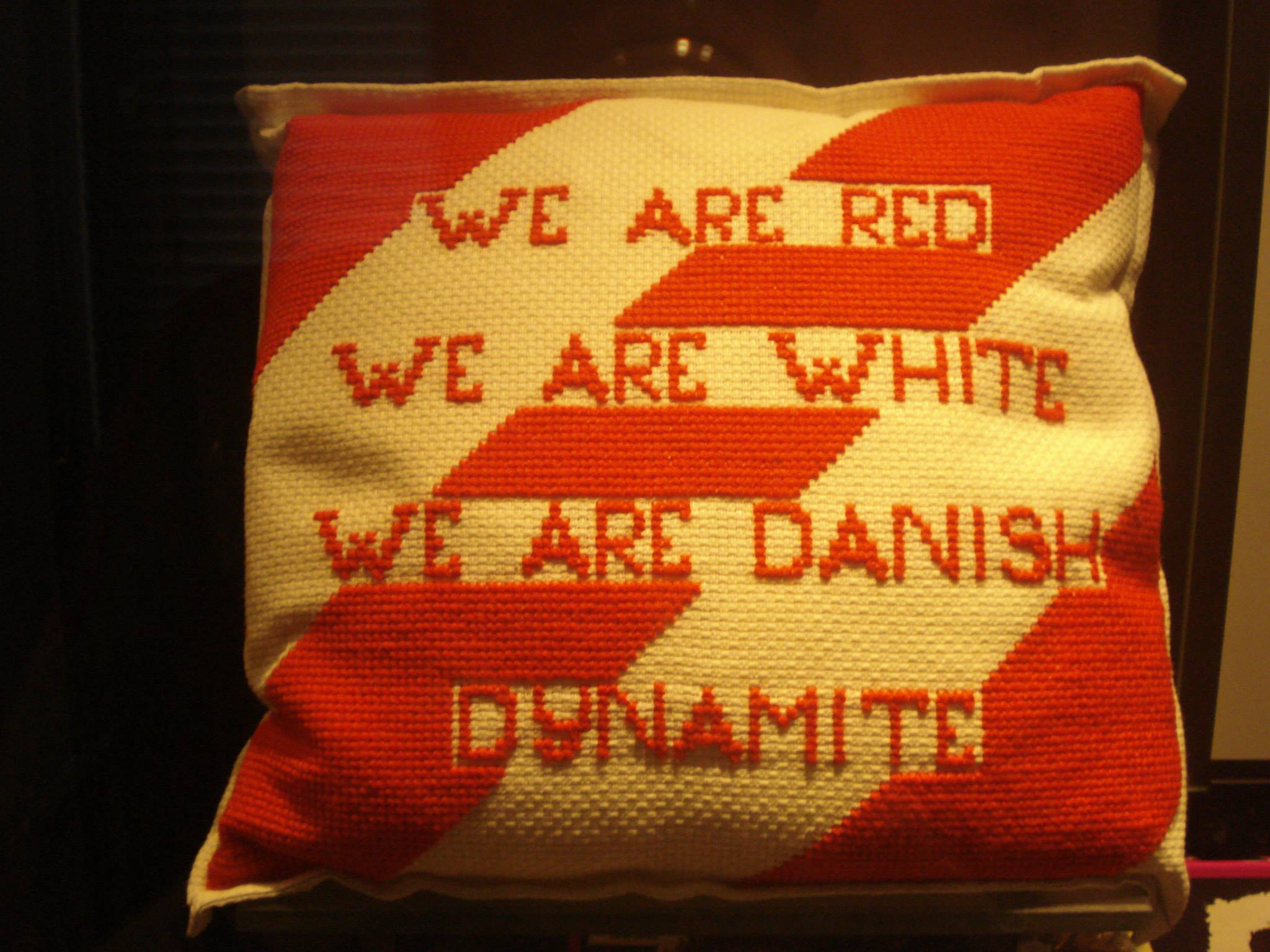
Exhibit from the Danish 20th century section

== Publications (selected) ==
Nationalmuseets Arbejdsmark is the title of the museum's yearbook which has been published since 1928 and contains articles and other contributions. ISSN 0084-9308

- Nationalmuseets Arbejdsmark 1807 - 2007. København: Nationalmuseet, 2007 ISBN 978-87-7602-079-8

== See also ==
- Dankirke
- Frilandsmuseet
- Frøslev
- The Lewis Collection
- Liselund Manor
- Lille Mølle, Christianshavn
- Rømø
- List of museums in Denmark
